= Beatrice =

Beatrice may refer to:

- Beatrice (given name)

== Places ==
=== In the United States ===
- Beatrice, Alabama, a town
- Beatrice, Humboldt County, California, a locality
- Beatrice, Georgia, an unincorporated community
- Beatrice, Indiana, an unincorporated community
- Beatrice, Nebraska, a city
- Beatrice, West Virginia, an unincorporated community

=== Elsewhere ===
- Beatrice, Queensland, a locality in the Tablelands Region, Queensland, Australia
- Beatrice, Zimbabwe, a village

== Arts and entertainment ==
- Beatrice (1919 film), an Italian historical film
- Beatrice (1987 film), a French-Italian historical drama
- Beatrice (radio programme), Sveriges Radio's 1989 Christmas calendar
- Beatrice (band), a Hungarian rock band
- "Beatrice", a song from Sam Rivers' time with Blue Note, on the 1964 album Fuchsia Swing Song
- Beatrice (singer), Béatrice Poulot (born 1968), French singer
- Luca Beatrice (1961–2025), Italian art critic

=== Literature ===
- Beatrice Portinari, principal inspiration for Dante Alighieri's Vita Nuova, and the Beatrice in his Divine Comedy
- Beatrice, 1890 novel by H. Rider Haggard
- Beatrice the Sixteenth, 1909 novel by Thomas Baty (as Irene Clyde)

== Other uses ==
- Beatrice Foods, a former major American food processing company
  - Beatrice Foods Canada
- Beatrice (psychedelic), a drug
- HMS Beatrice, several ships
- MSC Beatrice, a container ship
- Beatrice oil field in the Scottish sector of the North Sea
- Beatrice Wind Farm in the Scottish sector of the North Sea

== See also ==
- "Beatrijs", Dutch poem
- Beatrix
