= The Stronger Passion =

1921 film

- Directed by: Herbert Brenon
- Written by: Herbert Brenon; H. Rider Haggard (novel)
- Starring: Marie Doro; Sandro Salvini
- Cinematography: Giuseppe Filippa
- Production company: Caesar Film
- Distributed by: Unione Cinematografica Italiana
- Release date: 1921
- Country: Italy
- Languages: Silent; Italian intertitles

Beatrice is a 1921 Italian silent drama film directed by Herbert Brenon and starring Marie Doro and Sandro Salvini. It is based on the 1890 novel Beatrice by H. Rider Haggard and is also known by the alternative title of The Stronger Passion. It is a separate film from Brenon's 1919 Beatrice which starred Francesca Bertini as Beatrice Portinari.

The film's sets were designed by the art director Alfredo Manzi.

== Cast ==
- Marie Doro as Beatrice
- Sandro Salvini as Bingham
- Marcella Sabbatini
- Mina D'Orvella
- Mimi
- Angelo Gallina
- Silvana

== Bibliography ==
- Phillips, Alastair & Vincendeau, Ginette. Journeys of Desire: European Actors in Hollywood. British Film Institute, 2006.
