= The Youth of the Devil =

1921 film

- Italian: La giovinezza del diavolo
- Directed by: Roberto Roberti
- Written by: Riccardo Artuffo
- Starring: Francesca Bertini
- Cinematography: Alberto G. Carta; Otello Martelli
- Production company: Caesar Film
- Distributed by: Caesar Film
- Release date: 1921
- Country: Italy
- Languages: Silent; Italian intertitles

The Youth of the Devil (Italian: La giovinezza del diavolo) is a 1921 Italian silent film directed by Roberto Roberti and starring Francesca Bertini.

The film's sets were designed by the art director Alfredo Manzi.

== Cast ==
- Francesca Bertini as the old Duchess / Fausta
- Gino Viotti as the old Marquis
- Ignazio Bracci
- Maud de Mosley
- Lydianne as adventurer
- Ettore Piergiovanni as the young nephew of the Marquis
- Raimondo Van Riel as Devil
- Achille Vitti as the Quaestor
