= Gabriel Rosca =

French actor, screenwriter and film director

- Born: Fernand Gabriel Cahours; Marseille
- Died: 4 September 1944 (aged 48); 16th arrondissement of Paris
- Occupation(s): Actor, film director, screenwriter

Fernand Gabriel Cahours called Gabriel Rosca, (8 September 1895 – 4 September 1943), was a French actor, screenwriter and film director of Italian descent.

== Filmography ==
Actor

- 1920 : The Shadow, by Roberto Roberti
- 1920 : Mademoiselle from Armentieres by Maurice Elvey
- 1921 : L'Aviateur masqué, by Robert Péguy as Hoffer
- 1926 : The Triumph of the Rat, by Graham Cutts as the Apache danceur
- 1926 : Mademoiselle d'Armentières, by Maurice Elvey as Carl Branz
- 1927 : Le Chemin de la rémission / Calvaire (Drumul iertarii), by Gabriel Rosca and Ion Niculescu-Bruna as Jean Bernard

Director

- 1927 : Le Chemin de la rémission / Calvaire (Drumul iertarii), by Gabriel Rosca and Ion Niculescu-Bruna
- 1928 : Jim Hackett champion
- 1932 : Rocambole
- 1935 : La Coqueluche de ces dames
- 1938 : La Marraine du régiment by Jean Gobet

Screenwriter

- 1932 : Rocambole, after the novel by Ponson du Terrail
