= The Serpent (1920 film) =

1920 film

- Directed by: Roberto Roberti
- Starring: Francesca Bertini
- Cinematography: Alberto G. Carta
- Production company: Caesar Film
- Distributed by: Caesar Film
- Release date: January 1920
- Country: Italy
- Languages: Silent; Italian intertitles

The Serpent (Italian: La serpe) is a 1920 Italian silent film directed by Roberto Roberti and starring Francesca Bertini.

== Cast ==
- Francesca Bertini
- Vittorio Bianchi
- Luigi Cigoli
- Emma Farnesi
- Raoul Maillard
- Duilio Marrazzi
- Sandro Salvini

== Bibliography ==
- Abel, Richard. Encyclopedia of Early Cinema. Taylor & Francis, 2005.
