= Darkness (1916 film) =

1916 film by Roberto Roberti

- Directed by: Roberto Roberti
- Written by: Roberto Roberti
- Starring: Lina Simoni
- Cinematography: Luigi Filippa
- Production company: Aquila Films
- Distributed by: Aquila Films
- Release date: October 1916
- Country: Italy
- Languages: Silent; Italian intertitles

Darkness (Italian: Tenebre) is a 1916 Italian silent film directed by Roberto Roberti and starring Lina Simoni.

== Bibliography ==
- Abel, Richard. Encyclopedia of Early Cinema. Taylor & Francis, 2005.
