= Princess Giorgio =

1920 film

- Directed by: Roberto Roberti
- Starring: Francesca Bertini; Livio Pavanelli
- Production companies: Bertini Film; Caesar Film
- Distributed by: Caesar Film
- Release date: April 1920
- Country: Italy
- Languages: Silent; Italian intertitles

Princess Giorgio (Italian: La principessa Giorgio) is a 1920 Italian silent film directed by Roberto Roberti and starring Francesca Bertini and Livio Pavanelli.

== Cast ==
- Alberto Albertini
- Francesca Bertini
- Luigi Cigoli
- Beppo Corradi
- Gemma De Sanctis
- Silvia Maitre
- Livio Pavanelli
- Nicola Pescatori
- Giovanni Schettini

== Bibliography ==
- Cristina Jandelli. Le dive italiane del cinema muto. L'epos, 2006.
