= Indian Vampire =

1913 film

- Directed by: Roberto Roberti
- Starring: Bice Waleran
- Production company: Aquila Films
- Distributed by: Aquila Films
- Release date: December 1913
- Country: Italy
- Languages: Silent; Italian intertitles

Indian Vampire (Italian: La vampira indiana) is a 1913 Italian silent Western film directed by Roberto Roberti and starring Bice Waleran.

== Cast ==
- Antonietta Calderari
- Frederico Elvezi
- Antonio Greco (credited as Signor Greco)
- Giovanni Pezzinga
- Roberto Roberti
- Angiolina Solari
- Bice Waleran

== Bibliography ==
- Brunetta, Gian Piero. The History of Italian Cinema. Princeton University Press, 2009.
