= The Race to the Throne =

- Directed by: Roberto Roberti
- Starring: Tilde Kassay
- Cinematography: Alberto G. Carta
- Production company: Caesar Film
- Distributed by: Caesar Film
- Release date: February 1919
- Country: Italy
- Languages: Silent; Italian intertitles

The Race to the Throne (Italian: La corsa al trono) is a 1919 Italian silent film directed by Roberto Roberti and starring Tilde Kassay.

== Cast ==
- Riccardo Achilli
- Isa De Novegradi
- Alfredo Infusini
- Tilde Kassay
- Gustavo Serena
- Guido Trento

== Bibliography ==
- Gian Piero Brunetta. Il cinema muto italiano: de "La presa di Roma" a "Sole" 1905-1929. Laterza, 2008.
