= The Bandit of Port Avon =

- Directed by: Roberto Roberti
- Starring: Bice Waleran
- Production company: Aquila Films
- Distributed by: Aquila Films
- Release date: June 1914
- Country: Italy
- Languages: Silent; Italian intertitles

The Bandit of Port Avon (Italian: Il bandito di Port-Aven) is a 1914 Italian silent film directed by Roberto Roberti and starring Bice Waleran. It was made by the Turin-based Aquila Films.

== Cast ==
- Giuseppe De Witten
- Giulio Donadio
- Roberto Roberti
- Oreste Visalli
- Bice Waleran
- Claudia Zambuto

== Bibliography ==
- Giorgio Bertellini. Italy in Early American Cinema: Race, Landscape, and the Picturesque. Indiana University Press, 2010.
