= The Fall of the Curtain =

1920 film

- Directed by: Roberto Roberti
- Starring: Francesca Bertini
- Production companies: Bertini Film; Caesar Film
- Distributed by: Caesar Film
- Release date: June 1920
- Country: Italy
- Languages: Silent; Italian intertitles

The Fall of the Curtain (Italian: Lisa Fleuron) is a 1920 Italian silent film directed by Roberto Roberti and starring Francesca Bertini.

== Cast ==
- Francesca Bertini
- Luigi Cigoli
- Mina D'Orvella
- Isabel De Lizaso
- Raoul Maillard
- Augusto Poggioli
- Sandro Salvini

== Bibliography ==
- Goble, Alan. The Complete Index to Literary Sources in Film. Walter de Gruyter, 1999.
