= The Danube Boatman =

- Directed by: Roberto Roberti
- Starring: Bice Waleran; Claudia Zambuto
- Production company: Aquila Films
- Distributed by: Aquila Films
- Release date: February 1914
- Country: Italy
- Languages: Silent; Italian intertitles

The Danube Boatman (Italian: Il barcaiolo del Danubio) is a 1914 Italian silent film directed by Roberto Roberti and starring Bice Waleran and Claudia Zambuto.

== Cast ==
- Giuseppe De Witten
- Giulio Donadio
- Frederico Elvezi
- Giovanni Pezzinga
- Roberto Roberti
- Oreste Visalli
- Bice Waleran
- Claudia Zambuto

== Bibliography ==
- Gian Piero Brunetta. Il cinema muto italiano: de "La presa di Roma" a "Sole" 1905-1929. Laterza, 2008.
