= The Last Dream (film) =

1921 film

- Directed by: Roberto Roberti
- Starring: Francesca Bertini
- Production companies: Bertini Film; Caesar Film
- Distributed by: Caesar Film
- Release date: June 1921
- Country: Italy
- Languages: Silent; Italian intertitles

The Last Dream (Italian: L'ultimo sogno) is a 1921 Italian silent film directed by Roberto Roberti and starring Francesca Bertini.

== Plot ==
Maria is forced to flee her village after the suicide of her lover’s wife. She begins anew in a small fishing community, where she meets and marries Guglielmo, a naval officer. As they embark on their honeymoon at sea, her former lover Giovanni reappears and confronts Guglielmo about Maria’s past. In a tragic altercation, Guglielmo kills Giovanni but also loses his love for Maria. Consumed by despair, Maria throws herself into the sea just as his ship is about to depart.

== Cast ==
- Francesca Bertini
- Giorgio Bonaiti
- Raoul Maillard
- Mario Parpagnoli
- Bianca Renieri
- Marcella Sabbatini

== Bibliography ==
- Cristina Jandelli. Le dive italiane del cinema muto. L'epos, 2006.
