= Alfredo Manzi =

Italian art director

- Occupation: Art director
- Years active: 1915-1951 (film)

Alfredo Manzi was an Italian art director. He designed the film sets on around forty productions during his career.

== Selected filmography ==
- Assunta Spina (1915)
- The Lady of the Camellias (1915)
- Odette (1916)
- Fedora (1916)
- The Clemenceau Affair (1917)
- Tosca (1918)
- The Stronger Passion (1921)
- The Nude Woman (1922)
- The Silent Partner (1939)
- Angelica (1939)
- Kean (1940)
- Bridge of Glass (1940)
- Rita da Cascia (1943)

== Bibliography ==
- Bayman, Louis. Directory of World Cinema: Italy. Intellect Books, 2011.
