= The Sphinx (1920 film) =

1920 film

- Directed by: Roberto Roberti
- Written by: Octave Feuillet (play Le Sphinx)
- Starring: Francesca Bertini
- Production companies: Bertini Film; Caesar Film
- Distributed by: Caesar Film
- Release date: October 1920
- Country: Italy
- Languages: Silent; Italian intertitles

The Sphinx (Italian: La sfinge) is a 1920 Italian silent film directed by Roberto Roberti and starring Francesca Bertini.

== Cast ==
- Alberto Albertini
- Francesca Bertini
- Giuseppe Farnesi
- Elena Lunda
- Mario Parpagnoli
- Augusto Poggioli

== Bibliography ==
- Cristina Jandelli. Le dive italiane del cinema muto. L'epos, 2006.
