= Fedora (1913 film) =

- Directed by: Achille Consalvi
- Starring: Claudia Zambuto
- Production company: Aquila Films
- Distributed by: Aquila Films
- Release date: June 1913
- Country: Italy
- Languages: Silent; Italian intertitles

Fedora is a 1913 Italian silent film directed by Achille Consalvi and starring Claudia Zambuto.

== Cast ==
- Claudia Zambuto as Fedora
- Gero Zambuto
- Frederico Elvezi
- Giuseppe De Witten
- Cesare Amerio
- Signor Cappello
- Achille Consalvi

== Bibliography ==
- Abel, Richard. Encyclopedia of Early Cinema. Taylor & Francis, 2005.
