= Diana Sorel =

Diana Sorel may refer to:

- Diana Sorel (film), a 1921 Italian silent film
- Diana Sorel (actress) (born 1946), a Spanish actress
