= The Cavalcade of Dreams =

- Directed by: Roberto Roberti
- Starring: Bice Waleran
- Production company: Aquila Films
- Distributed by: Aquila Films
- Release date: March 1917
- Country: Italy
- Languages: Silent; Italian intertitles

The Cavalcade of Dreams (Italian: La cavalcata dei sogni) is a 1917 Italian silent film directed by Roberto Roberti and starring Bice Waleran.

== Reception ==
The film premiered in Rome on March 24, 1917. La Vita Cinematografica in Turin panned it, writing that although the premise and staging were hopeful, "...what an illogical and idiotic unfolding of the plot; what a pitiful performance; what a lack of elegance and what listlessness among the actors!"

== Cast ==
- Piera Bouvier
- Antonietta Calderari
- Roberto Roberti
- Domenico Serra
- Bice Waleran

== Bibliography ==
- Moscati, Italo. Sergio Leone: quando il cinema era grande. Lindau, 2007.
