= Tower of Terror =

Tower of Terror may refer to:

== Amusement rides ==
- Tower of Terror (Gold Reef City), a vertical drop roller coaster in Johannesburg, South Africa
- Tower of Terror II, a shuttle roller coaster in Queensland, Australia
- The Twilight Zone Tower of Terror, an accelerated drop tower attraction at Disney theme parks

== Film and television ==
- Tower of Terror (1913 film), an Italian silent film
- Tower of Terror (1941 film), a British spy thriller
- Tower of Terror (1971 film), a British thriller
- Tower of Terror (1990 film), an American action comedy
- Tower of Terror (1997 film), an American mystery film loosely based on the Disney theme park amusement ride
- "Tower of Terror" (Pokémon episode)
