= Theodora (1914 film) =

- Directed by: Roberto Roberti
- Starring: Bice Waleran
- Production company: Aquila Films
- Distributed by: Aquila Films
- Release date: November 1914
- Country: Italy
- Languages: Silent; Italian intertitles

Theodora (Italian: Teodora) is a 1914 Italian silent historical film directed by Roberto Roberti and starring Bice Waleran.

== Cast ==
- Bice Waleran as Teodora
- Giovanni Pezzinga
- Roberto Roberti

== Bibliography ==
- Abel, Richard. Encyclopedia of Early Cinema. Taylor & Francis, 2005.
