= Chiantoni =

Chiantoni is a surname. Notable people with the surname include:

- Giannina Chiantoni (1881–1972), Italian actress
- Renato Chiantoni (1906–1979), Italian actor
