= Tosca (1941 film) =

Italian historical drama film

- Directed by: Carl Koch
- Screenplay by: Alessandro De Stefani; Carmine Gallone; Carl Koch; Luchino Visconti (uncredited); Jean Renoir (uncredited)
- Story by: Victorien Sardou (play); Giuseppe Giacosa (libretto); Luigi Illica (libretto)
- Produced by: Giuseppe Barattolo
- Starring: Imperio Argentina; Michel Simon; Rossano Brazzi
- Cinematography: Ubaldo Arata
- Edited by: Gino Betrone
- Music by: Umberto Mancini
- Production company: Scalera Film
- Distributed by: Scalera Film
- Release date: 27 January 1941
- Running time: 100 minutes
- Country: Italy
- Language: Italian

Tosca is a 1941 Italian historical drama film directed by Carl Koch and starring Imperio Argentina, Michel Simon and Rossano Brazzi. It is an adaptation of Victorien Sardou's play La Tosca and its subsequent opera version, Tosca, composed by Giacomo Puccini to a libretto by Luigi Illica and Giuseppe Giacosa. It was released in the United States as The Story of Tosca.

It was shot at the Scalera Studios in Rome with location shooting also taking place around the city. The film's sets were designed by the art director Gustav Abel.

Jean Renoir was originally hired as the film's director, and was encouraged to make the film by the French government as part of an effort to encourage Italy to remain neutral in the Second World War. However, he left Rome following Italy's entry into the war and the film was completed by the German director Carl Koch.

In 1943 it was released in Spain (where Imperio Argentina was a major star) by the film studio Cifesa.

== Plot ==
In Rome during the first half of the 19th century, successful singer Floria Tosca is jealous of her lover, Mario Cavaradossi, a painter and a Jacobin. When another revolutionary, Count Angelotti, manages to escape from prison, he takes refuge in the church where the painter is working. There, he is assisted by his sister, the Marchesa Attavanti, who provides him with women’s clothing. Disguised as a woman, he flees to a hideout arranged by the painter—both of them pursued by Scarpia, the chief of police. However, the Marchesa Attavanti has left a fan behind in the church, leading Tosca to believe that Cavaradossi is being unfaithful to her.

Playing upon Tosca’s jealousy, Scarpia manages to trick her into revealing where Angelotti is hiding, and the fugitive is arrested. Cavaradossi, his accomplice, is also sentenced to be executed by a firing squad; however, Scarpia promises Tosca that he will stage a mock execution if she submits to him. Tosca pretends to agree, but then stabs Scarpia. Yet, Scarpia had intended to deceive her all along, and Cavaradossi is executed for real. Driven mad by grief—and realizing that her own irrational jealousy was the cause of her lover’s death—Tosca commits suicide by throwing herself from the ramparts of Castel Sant’Angelo.

== Cast ==
- Imperio Argentina as Floria Tosca
- Michel Simon as Il barone Scarpia
- Rossano Brazzi as Mario Cavaradossi
- Carla Candiani as La marchesa Attavanti
- Olga Vittoria Gentilli as La regina di Napoli
- Adriano Rimoldi as Angelotti
- Nicolás D. Perchicot as Sciarrone
- Juan Calvo as Spoletta
- Nicola Maldacea as Il pittore di corte
- Claudio Ermelli as Paisiello
- Enzo Musumeci Greco as L'ufficiale della regina
