= Consuelita =

1925 film

- Directed by: Roberto Roberti
- Starring: Francesca Bertini; Ida Carloni Talli; Alfonso Cassini
- Cinematography: Otello Martelli
- Production company: Caesar Film
- Release date: August 1925
- Country: Italy
- Languages: Silent; Italian intertitles

Consuelita is a 1925 Italian silent comedy film directed by Roberto Roberti and starring Francesca Bertini, Ida Carloni Talli and Alfonso Cassini.

== Cast ==
- Francesca Bertini
- Ida Carloni Talli
- Alfonso Cassini
- Guido Graziosi

== Bibliography ==
- Cristina Jandelli. Le dive italiane del cinema muto. L'epos, 2006.
