= The Cheerful Soul =

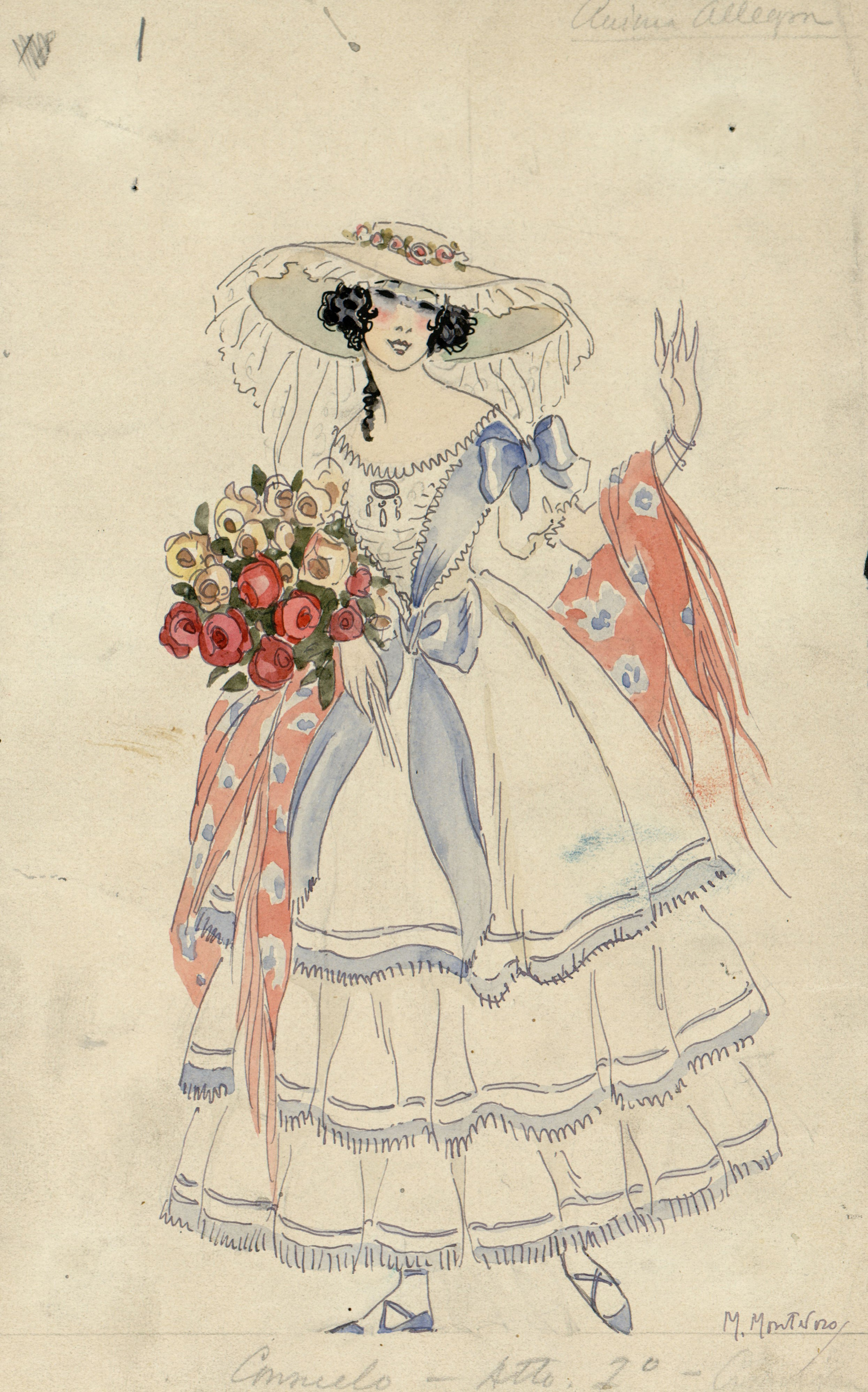
- Consuelo (soprano), costume design for Anima allegra act 1 (1921).
- Directed by: Roberto Roberti
- Written by: Serafín Álvarez Quintero (play)
- Starring: Francesca Bertini; Livio Pavanelli
- Cinematography: Alberto G. Carta
- Production company: Caesar Film
- Distributed by: Caesar Film
- Release date: August 1919
- Country: Italy
- Languages: Silent; Italian intertitles

The Cheerful Soul (Italian: Anima allegra) is a 1919 Italian silent comedy film directed by Roberto Roberti and starring Francesca Bertini. It is based on a play by Serafín Álvarez Quintero.

== Cast ==
- Francesca Bertini
- Luigi Cigoli
- Gemma De Sanctis
- Sig Pasquali
- Livio Pavanelli
- Maria Riccardi
- Sandro Salvini
- Giovanni Schettini

== Bibliography ==
- Goble, Alan. The Complete Index to Literary Sources in Film. Walter de Gruyter, 1999.
