= The Princess of Bedford =

- Directed by: Roberto Roberti
- Starring: Bice Waleran
- Production company: Aquila Films
- Distributed by: Aquila Films
- Release date: May 1914
- Country: Italy
- Languages: Silent; Italian intertitles

The Princess of Bedford (Italian: La principessina di Bedford) is a 1914 Italian silent film directed by Roberto Roberti and starring Bice Waleran.

== Cast ==
- Giuseppe De Witten
- Frederico Elvezi
- Minny Fosca
- Maria Orciuoli
- Leo Pezzinga
- Bice Waleran
- Claudia Zambuto

== Bibliography ==
- Aldo Bernardini, Vittorio Martinelli. Il cinema muto italiano, Volume 6, Part 2. Nuova ERI, 1993.
