= Maciste the Policeman =

- Directed by: Roberto Roberti
- Starring: Bartolomeo Pagano; Claudia Zambuto
- Cinematography: Giovanni Tomatis
- Production company: Itala Film
- Distributed by: Itala Film
- Release date: March 1918
- Country: Italy
- Languages: Silent; Italian intertitles

Maciste the Policeman (Italian: Maciste poliziotto) is a 1918 Italian silent film directed by Roberto Roberti and starring Bartolomeo Pagano and Claudia Zambuto.

== Cast ==
- Bartolomeo Pagano as Maciste
- Italia Almirante-Manzini
- Ruggero Capodaglio
- Claudia Zambuto
- Vittorio Rossi Pianelli
- Arnaldo Arnaldi

== Bibliography ==
- Jacqueline Reich. The Maciste Films of Italian Silent Cinema. Indiana University Press, 2015.
