= Countess Sarah =

- Directed by: Roberto Roberti
- Written by: Ezio Berti; Vittorio Bianchi; Georges Ohnet (novel)
- Starring: Francesca Bertini
- Cinematography: Otello Martelli
- Production company: Caesar Film
- Release date: September 1919
- Country: Italy
- Languages: Silent; Italian intertitles

Countess Sarah (Italian:La contessa Sara) is a 1919 Italian silent film directed by Roberto Roberti and starring Francesca Bertini.

== Cast ==
- Francesca Bertini
- Sandro Salvini
- Alberto Albertini
- Vittorio Bianchi
- Emma Farnesi
- Giuseppe Farnesi
- Raoul Maillard
- Ugo Piperno

== Bibliography ==
- Abel, Richard. Encyclopedia of Early Cinema. Taylor & Francis, 2005.
