= Eugenia Grandet =

Eugenia Grandet may refer to:

- Eugenia Grandet (1918 film), an Italian silent historical film, based on the novel Eugénie Grandet
- Eugenia Grandet (1946 film), an Italian historical drama film, based on the novel Eugénie Grandet
- Eugenia Grandet (1953 film), a Mexican drama film, based on the novel Eugénie Grandet

== See also ==
- Eugénie Grandet, a 1833 novel by Honoré de Balzac
- Eugénie Grandet (film), a 1994 French film directed by Jean-Daniel Verhaeghe
