= Assunta Spina (1915 film) =

1915 film

- Directed by: Gustavo Serena
- Written by: Gustavo Serena; Francesca Bertini
- Based on: Assunta Spina by Salvatore di Giacomo (play)
- Produced by: Giuseppe Barattolo
- Starring: Francesca Bertini; Gustavo Serena; Carlo Benetti
- Cinematography: Alberto G. Carta
- Release date: 1915
- Running time: 73 minutes
- Country: Italy
- Languages: Silent film Italian intertitles

Assunta Spina is a 1915 Italian silent film. Outside Italy, it is sometimes known as Sangue Napolitano ("Neapolitan Blood").

== Plot ==
Assunta Spina is a laundress living in Naples, engaged to a violent butcher named Michele Mangiafuoco. She is also courted intensely by Raffaele. When she accepts Raffaele's offer to dance during an open air feast in Posillipo, as she feels Michele is ignoring her, tragedy strikes. Michele, blinded by rage, slashes her face and is subsequently arrested. During the trial she bears witness in order to rescue him, saying he never wounded her, but the jury does not believe her. She is enticed by the court vice-chancellor to strike a bargain—Michele will stay in the nearby prison of Naples instead of Avellino, and at the end of the punishment Michele will kill the vice-chancellor before Assunta's eyes. She must take responsibility for the act before the eyes of the police in order to save her man.

== Production ==
The original novel from which the story was taken was written by Salvatore di Giacomo, and had been adapted to a successful theatre drama in 1909. Before Francesca Bertini became a famous actress, she would perform in this drama as a walk-on in the laundry scenes. Five years later, when she had started her career as a film actress, she and actor-director Gustavo Serena adapted the drama for film. Bertini is sometimes listed as co-director of the film. Bertini claimed with some support that she was the director of the film. The film stock was colorized with 4 colors and distributed worldwide by Caesar Film.

== Cast ==
- Francesca Bertini - Assunta Spina
- Gustavo Serena - Michele Boccadifuoco
- Carlo Benetti - Don Federigo Funelli
- Luciano Albertini - Raffaele
- Amelia Cipriani - Peppina
- Antonio Cruichi - Assunta's father
- Alberto Collo - Officer
- Alberto Albertini

== Other versions ==
In 1930 the plot of Assunta Spina inspired a new film by Roberto Roberti. Another was produced in 1948, directed by Mario Mattoli, with Anna Magnani and Eduardo De Filippo as the protagonists.
