= Gustavo Serena =

Italian actor (1881–1970)

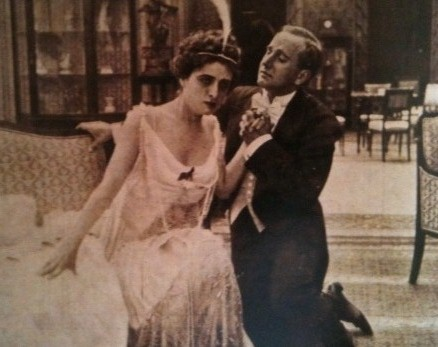
- Serena and Francesca Bertini in The Lady of the Camellias (1915)
- Born: 5 October 1881; Naples, Italy
- Died: 16 April 1970 (aged 88); Rome, Italy
- Other name: Signor Serena
- Occupations: Actor, film director
- Years active: 1912–1961

Gustavo Serena (5 October 1881 – 16 April 1970) was an Italian actor and film director. He appeared in 107 films between 1909 and 1961. He also directed 33 films between 1912 and 1932. He was born in Naples and died in Rome.

== Selected filmography ==
- Lucrezia Borgia (1912)
- Quo Vadis (1913)
- Assunta Spina (1915)
- The Lady of the Camellias (1915)
- The Blind Woman of Sorrento (1916)
- The Clemenceau Affair (1917)
- Mariute (1918)
- Niniche (1918)
- The Race to the Throne (1919)
- The Fear of Love (1920)
- Diana Sorel (1921)
- A Dying Nation (1922)
- The Cry of the Eagle (1923)
- The White Sister (1923)
- Zaganella and the Cavalier (1932)
- Giuseppe Verdi (1938)
- Shipwrecked (1939)
- It Always Ends That Way (1939)
- The Boarders at Saint-Cyr (1939)
- The Flame That Will Not Die (1949)
- Night Taxi (1950)
- The Cliff of Sin (1950)
- The Beggar's Daughter (1950)
- The Courier of Moncenisio (1956)
