= The Sinful Woman =

- Directed by: Roberto Roberti
- Written by: Roberto Roberti
- Produced by: Roberto Roberti
- Production company: Aquila Films
- Distributed by: Aquila Films
- Release date: September 1916
- Country: Italy
- Languages: Silent; Italian intertitles

The Sinful Woman (Italian: La peccatrice lit. 'The Sinner') is a 1916 Italian silent film directed by Roberto Roberti.

== Cast ==
- Agostino Borgato
- Signor De Nora
- François-Paul Donadio
- Domenico Marverti
- Jeanne Nolly
- Luigi Pavese

== Bibliography ==
- Abel, Richard. Encyclopedia of Early Cinema. Taylor & Francis, 2005.
