= Edoardo Bencivenga =

Italian film director

- Born: 1885; Naples, Kingdom of Italy
- Died: June 6, 1934 (aged 58–59); Rome, Kingdom of Italy
- Occupation: Film director
- Years active: 1907–1922

Edoardo Bencivenga (1885 – June 6, 1934) was an Italian film director. Bencivegna began his career in 1907 with his first short film Raffaello e la Fornarina. In his career, he made over 60 films, the last one in 1922.

== Career ==
Most of Bencivenga's work dates back to the first twenty years of the 1900s. He was very active as a director at the beginning of the century, both in short and feature films.

A family friend of Vittorio De Sica, he obtained him a small role in a silent film directed by Alfredo De Antoni, Il processo Clémenceau in 1917. His last known work is Gli eroi del Mare Nostro from 1923, a film about the Italian torpedo boat Premuda.

== Filmography ==
- Raffaello e la Fornarina – short film (1907)
- L'uomo dalla testa dura (1908)
- Raffaello Sanzio e la fornarina (1909)
- L'ignota – short film (1910) –
- Il serpe – short film (1910)
- Il barone Lagarde – short film (1910) –
- Maria Bricca (1910)
- I cavalieri della morte – short film (1910) –
- L'innocente (1911)
- Pietà di mamma – short film (1911)
- Il processo Clémenceau (1912)
- Se fossi Re! – short film (1912)
- La nave – short film (1912) – come Eduardo Bencivenga
- Il fischio della sirena – short film (1912)
- Il ragno – short film (1913)
- Cuor di poeta – short film (1913)
- L'epopea napoleonica (1914)
- Fata Morgana – short film (1914)
- La du Barry (1914)
- DuBarry (1915)
- L'onore di morire (1915)
- Cuore ed arte (1915)
- Il dubbio – short film (1915)
- Savoia, urrah! – short film (1915)
- Guerra redentrice (1915)
- Alla bajonetta!.. (1915) – as Eduardo Bencivenga
- Eroismo di madre – cortometraggio (1915)
- Il sacrificio del nonno – short film (1915)
- Il ridicolo (1916)
- Don Giovanni (1916)
- Trama sventata (1916)
- Il nemico occulto (1916)
- Il medaglione – short film (1916)
- Ferréol (1916)
- L'anello di Pierrot (1917)
- La figlia di Jorio (1917)
- Pazzia contagiosa – short film (1917)
- Le due orfanelle (1918)
- P.L.M. ossia l'assassinio della Paris-Lyon-Mediterranée (1918)
- Mariute (1918)
- L'orgoglio (1918)
- Voca e canta – short film (1918)
- L'ira (1918)
- Fiamme avvolgenti (1918)
- L'invidia (1919)
- Sullivan (1919)
- Il cieco (1919)
- La piovra (1919)
- La leggenda dei tre fiori (1919)
- La lussuria (1919)
- L'onore della famiglia (1919)
- La morte civile (1919)
- La colpa vendica la colpa (1919)
- Il cuore di Roma (1919)
- La donna dai capelli d'oro (1920)
- La follia del giuoco (1920)
- Fino alla tenebra (1920)
- Il marito perduto (1920)
- La donna, il diavolo, il tempo (1921)
- La moglie di sua eccellenza (1921)
- Il figlio di Coralie (1921)
- Hermione (1921)
- Dionisia (1921)
- Il dubbio (1921)
- Non è resurrezione senza morte (1922)
