= Niniche =

Niniche may refer to:

- Niniche (play), an 1878 play
- Niniche (1918 film), an Italian silent film
- Niniche (1925 film), a German silent film
