= Mariute =

- Directed by: Edoardo Bencivenga
- Starring: Francesca Bertini
- Production companies: Bertini Film; Caesar Film
- Distributed by: Caesar Film
- Release date: May 1918
- Country: Italy
- Languages: Silent; Italian intertitles

Mariute is a 1918 Italian silent drama film directed by Edoardo Bencivenga and starring Francesca Bertini.

== Cast ==
- Alberto Albertini
- Francesca Bertini
- Camillo De Riso
- Livio Pavanelli
- Gustavo Serena

== Bibliography ==
- Moliterno, Gino. The A to Z of Italian Cinema. Scarecrow Press, 2009.
