= Odette (1916 film) =

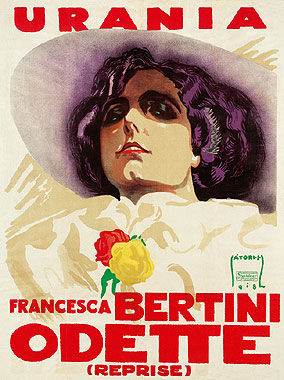
- Poster for 1918 Hungarian release
- Directed by: Giuseppe de Liguoro
- Written by: Giuseppe de Liguoro
- Starring: Francesca Bertini
- Cinematography: Alberto G. Carta
- Production company: Caesar Film
- Distributed by: Caesar Film
- Release date: 10 January 1916
- Country: Italy
- Languages: Silent; Italian intertitles

Odette is a 1916 Italian silent drama film based upon the play by Victorien Sardou, directed by Giuseppe de Liguoro, and starring Francesca Bertini, Alfredo De Antoni, and Carlo Benetti. It was remade in 1928 and 1935, with both versions starring Bertini.

The film's sets were designed by the art director Alfredo Manzi.

== Cast ==
- Francesca Bertini as Odette
- Alfredo De Antoni as André Latour, suo marito
- Carlo Benetti as L'avventuriero
- Olga Benetti as Consuelo
- Guido Brignone
- Camillo De Riso
- Sandro Ruffini

== Bibliography ==
- Moliterno, Gino. The A to Z of Italian Cinema. Scarecrow Press, 2009.
