= The Mystery of St. Martin's Bridge =

- Directed by: Roberto Roberti
- Starring: Bice Waleran
- Production company: Aquila Films
- Distributed by: Aquila Films
- Release date: 1913
- Country: Italy
- Languages: Silent; Italian intertitles

The Mystery of St. Martin's Bridge (Italian: L'assassina del Ponte S. Martin) is a 1913 Italian silent drama film directed by Roberto Roberti and starring Bice Waleran.

== Plot ==
"Lord Martagne, wins the heart of Cora, a mountain girl, and then casts her aside. Cora seeks revenge, but is foiled. Many passionate scenes follow, and the climax is reached when the girl disguised fights a duel with the nobleman and kills him. Another couple are convicted of the murder, but Cora confesses at the last moment."

== Cast ==
- Bice Waleran
- Roberto Roberti
- Antonietta Calderari
- Frederico Elvezi
- Maria Orciuoli

== Bibliography ==
- Moscati, Italo. Sergio Leone: quando il cinema era grande. Lindau, 2007.
