= The Shadow (1920 film) =

1920 film

- Directed by: Roberto Roberti
- Written by: Vittorio Bianchi; Octave Feuillet
- Starring: Francesca Bertini
- Cinematography: Allen M. Davey
- Production company: Caesar Film
- Distributed by: Caesar Film
- Release date: July 1920
- Country: Italy
- Languages: Silent; Italian intertitles

The Shadow (Italian: L'ombra) is a 1920 Italian silent film directed by Roberto Roberti and starring Francesca Bertini.

== Cast ==
In alphabetical order

- Francesca Bertini
- Ferruccio Biancini
- Maria Caserini
- Mary Fleuron
- Amleto Novelli
- Gabriel Rosca
- Domenico Serra

== Bibliography ==
- Cristina Jandelli. Le dive italiane del cinema muto. L'epos, 2006.
