= Pietro Sassoli =

Italian composer and conductor (1898–1946)

- Born: June 13, 1898; Ficarolo, Italy
- Died: April 14, 1946 (aged 47); Rome, Italy
- Occupations: Composer, conductor
- Years active: 1930–1946 (film)

Pietro Sassoli (13 June 1898 – 14 April 1946) was an Italian composer and conductor. He worked on a number of films during his career, including Alessandro Blasetti's Mother Earth (1931). He also worked on some early Roberto Rossellini films.

== Selected filmography ==
- Courtyard (1931)
- Court of Assizes (1931)
- Mother Earth (1931)
- The Opera Singer (1932)
- The Ambassador (1936)
- Ettore Fieramosca (1938)
- A Pilot Returns (1942)
- Odessa in Flames (1942)
- The Man with a Cross (1943)
- Rita of Cascia (1943)

== Bibliography ==
- Verdone, Luca. I film di Alessandro Blasetti. Gremese Editore, 1989.
