= Otello Martelli =

Italian cinematographer

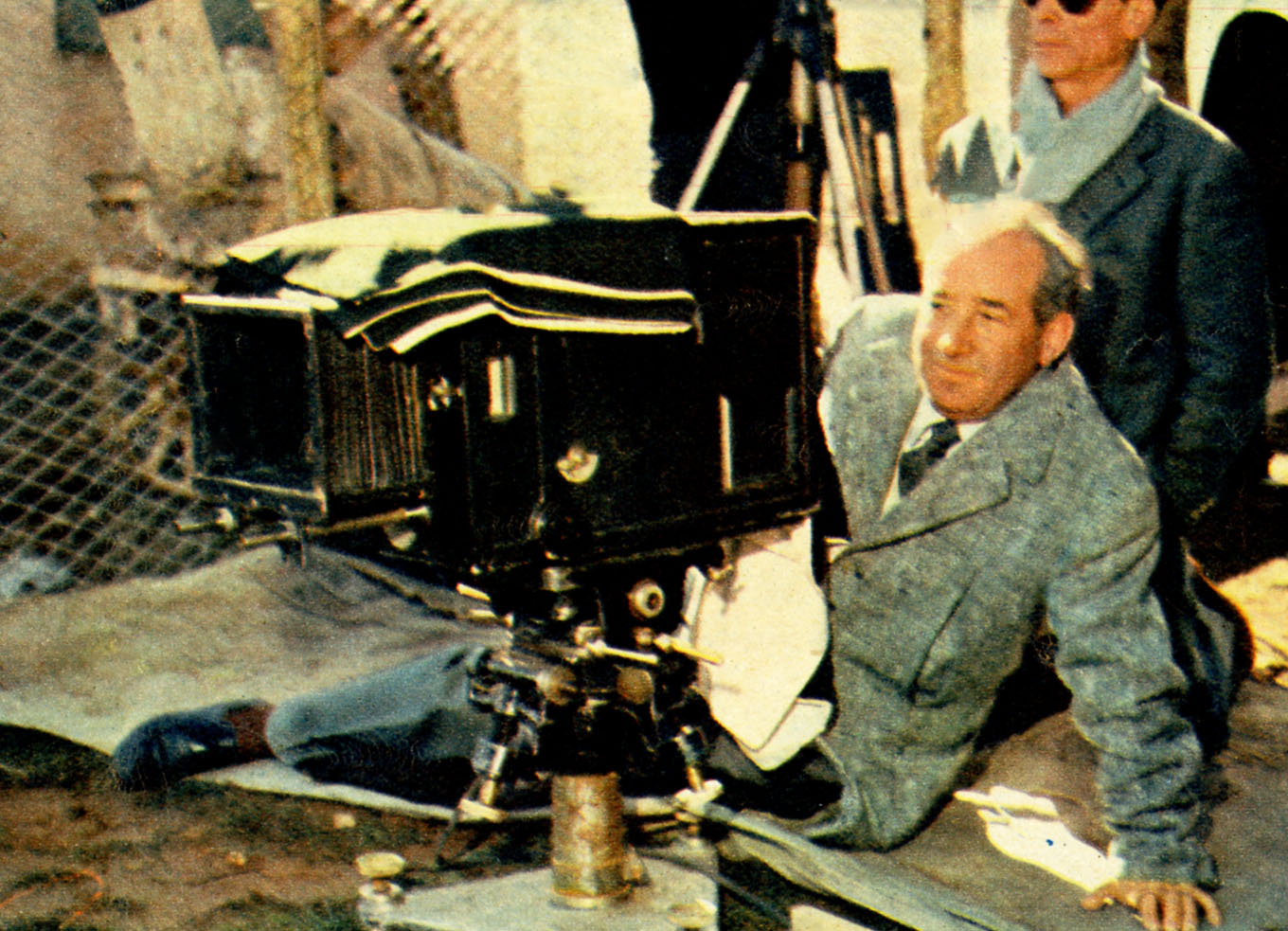
- Born: 19 May 1902; Rome, Kingdom of Italy
- Died: 20 February 2000 (aged 97); Rome, Italy

Otello Martelli (19 May 1902 – 20 February 2000) was an Italian cinematographer whose films include La Dolce Vita.

== Life and career ==
Born in Rome, he began work in 1920. He collaborated with Roberto Rossellini, Alberto Lattuada, Federico Fellini, Alessandro Blasetti, Giuseppe De Santis, Vittorio De Sica and Pier Paolo Pasolini. Specially was his collaboration with Fellini from 1950 (Luci del varietà) until 1961 (with the episode Le tentazioni del dottor Antonio in Boccaccio '70). His films include La Dolce Vita, Paisà, and L'oro di Napoli.

== Selected filmography ==
- Countess Sarah (1919)
- The Youth of the Devil (1921)
- Consuelita (1925)
- The Old Guard (1934)
- Cardinal Lambertini (1934)
- The Ancestor (1936)
- The Countess of Parma (1936)
- Bayonet (1936)
- The Ambassador (1936)
- To Live (1937)
- Marcella (1937)
- Mad Animals (1939)
- I, His Father (1939)
- Father For a Night (1939)
- Lucrezia Borgia (1940)
- Kean (1940)
- The Hero of Venice (1941)
- Tragic Night (1942)
- Captain Tempest (1942)
- The Gorgon (1942)
- In High Places (1943)
- Paisan (1946)
- Last Love (1947)
- Tragic Hunt (1947)
- The Great Dawn (1947)
- Bitter Rice (1949)
- Variety Lights (1950)
- Stromboli (1950)
- The Flowers of St. Francis (1950)
- Anna (1951)
- Honeymoon Deferred (1951)
- Rome 11:00 (1952)
- I Vitelloni (1953)
- The Gold of Naples (1954)
- La Strada (1954)
- Il Bidone (1955)
- Guendalina (1957)
- Vacanze a Ischia (1957)
- This Angry Age (1958)
- La Dolce Vita (1960)
- The Teacher from Vigevano (1963)
- Menage all'italiana (1965)
- Death Walks in Laredo (1966)
