= Hedda Gabler (1920 film) =

1920 film

- Directed by: Gero Zambuto; Giovanni Pastrone
- Written by: Henrik Ibsen (play)
- Cinematography: Segundo de Chomón; Giovanni Tomatis
- Release date: August 1920
- Country: Italy
- Languages: Silent; Italian intertitles

Hedda Gabler is a 1920 Italian silent drama film directed by Gero Zambuto and Giovanni Pastrone. It is based on the 1890 play Hedda Gabler by Henrik Ibsen.

== Cast ==
- Italia Almirante Manzini as Hedda Gabler
- Ettore Piergiovanni as Erberto Lovborg
- Oreste Bilancia as Giorgio Tessmann
- Diana D'Amore as Tea
- Vittorio Rossi Pianelli as Brak
- Letizia Quaranta as Edith
- Léonie Laporte as zia Giulia
- Gabriel Moreau

== Bibliography ==
- Goble, Alan. The Complete Index to Literary Sources in Film. Walter de Gruyter, 1999.
