= The Girl from Amalfi =

1921 film

- Directed by: Roberto Roberti
- Written by: Ennio Grammatica
- Starring: Lydia De Roberti
- Release date: 1921
- Country: Italy
- Languages: Silent; Italian intertitles

The Girl from Amalfi (Italian: La fanciulla d'Amalfi) is a 1921 Italian silent film directed by Roberto Roberti and starring Francesca Bertini and Lydia De Roberti.

== Cast ==
- Francesca Bertini
- Lydia De Roberti
- Jeanne Nolly
- Roberto Roberti

== Bibliography ==
- Bianchi, Pietro. Francesca Bertini e le dive del cinema muto. Unione tipografico-editrice torinese, 1969.
