= Livio Pavanelli =

Italian actor (1881–1958)

Livio Cesare Pavanelli
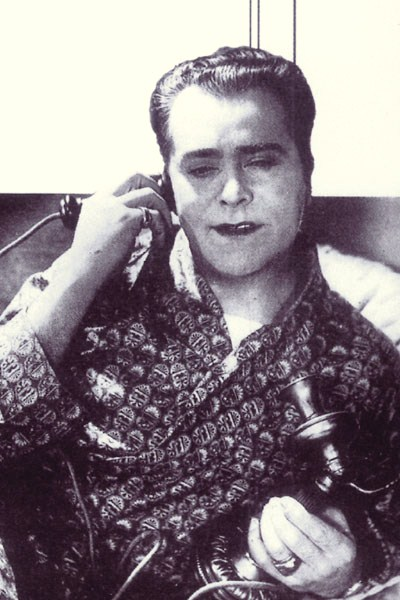
- Born: 7 September 1881; Copparo, Italy
- Died: 29 April 1958 (aged 76); Rome, Italy
- Occupation: Actor

Livio Cesare Pavanelli (7 September 1881 – 29 April 1958) was an Italian film actor.

Pavanelli was born in Copparo, Ferrara, Emilia-Romagna, Italy and died in Rome in 1958 at age 76.

== Selected filmography ==
- Mariute (1918)
- Fabiola (1918)
- The Cheerful Soul (1919)
- Princess Giorgio (1920)
- The Sack of Rome (1920)
- A Woman's Story (1920)
- The Second Wife (1922)
- The Most Beautiful Woman in the World (1924)
- Niniche (1925)
- The Story of Lilian Hawley (1925)
- Chamber Music (1925)
- Dancing Mad (1925)
- My Friend the Chauffeur (1926)
- Unmarried Daughters (1926)
- The Queen of the Baths (1926)
- The Ride in the Sun (1926)
- Kissing Is No Sin (1926)
- The Laughing Husband (1926)
- Mademoiselle Josette, My Woman (1926)
- The Schimeck Family (1926)
- Accommodations for Marriage (1926)
- The White Horse Inn (1926)
- Die Königin des Weltbades (1926)
- The Queen of Moulin Rouge (1926)
- When I Came Back (1926)
- Floretta and Patapon (1927)
- Homesick (1927)
- The Marriage Nest (1927)
- Madame Dares an Escapade (1927)
- A Girl of the People (1927)
- The Long Intermission (1927)
- Luther (1928)
- He Goes Right, She Goes Left! (1928)
- Charlotte Somewhat Crazy (1928)
- Endangered Girls (1928)
- Restless Hearts (1928)
- The House Without Men (1928)
- Scampolo (1928)
- The Green Monocle (1929)
- Crucified Girl (1929)
- German Wine (1929)
- Love in the Snow (1929)
- The Woman of Yesterday and Tomorrow (1928)
- Women on the Edge (1929)
- Bobby, the Petrol Boy (1929)
- Foolish Happiness (1929)
- Der Hund von Baskerville (1929)
- Marriage Strike (1930)
- Pergolesi (1932)
- L'ultimo dei Bergerac (1934)
- The Song of the Sun (1934)
- The Last of the Bergeracs (1934)
- To Live (1937)
- Marcella (1937)
- Biraghin (1946)
- The Other (1947)

== Bibliography ==
- Kulik, Karol (1990) [1975]. Alexander Korda: The Man Who Could Work Miracles. London: Virgin Books. ISBN 978-0-86369-446-2.
