= Torella dei Lombardi =

- Comune
- Comune di Torella dei Lombardi
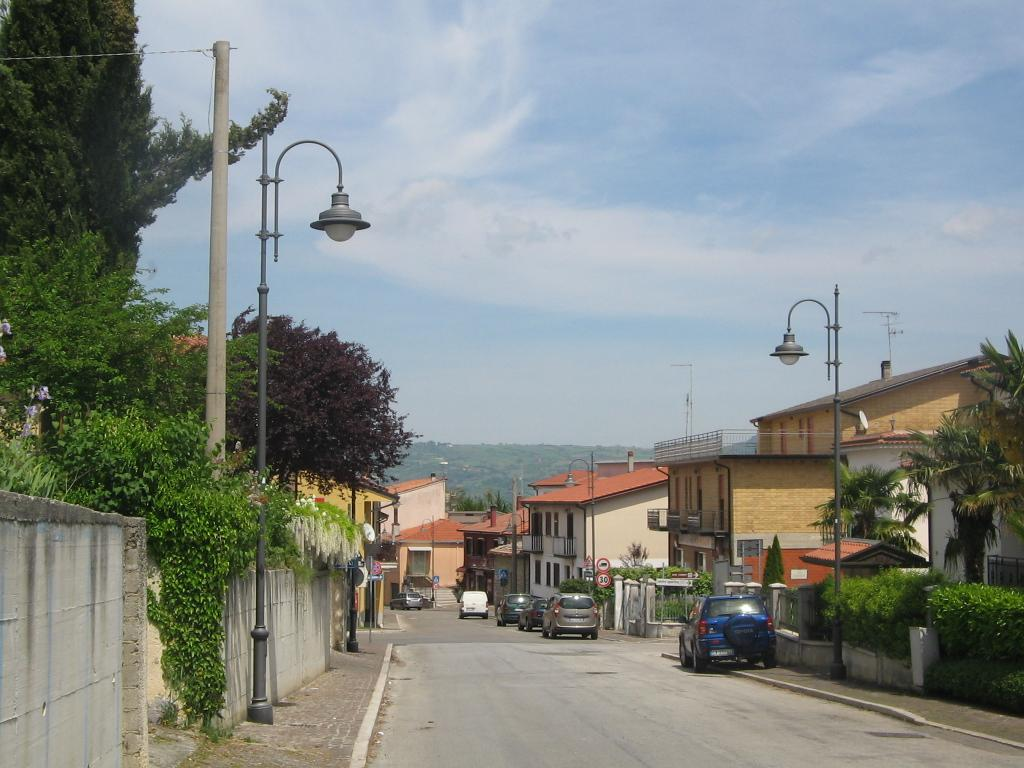
- The central street "Via Angelo Appia"

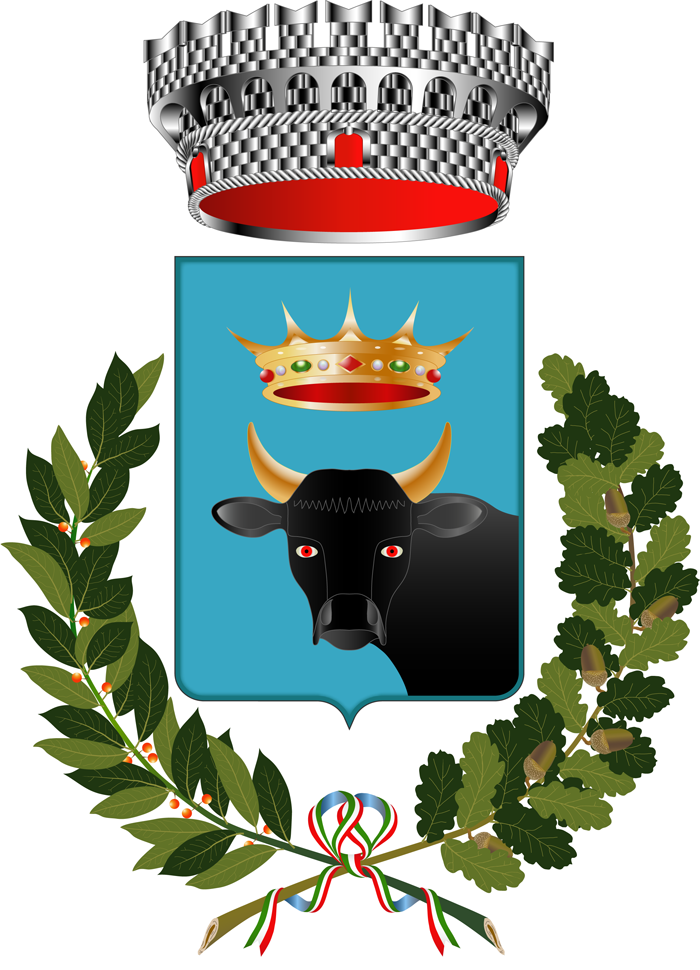
- Coat of arms

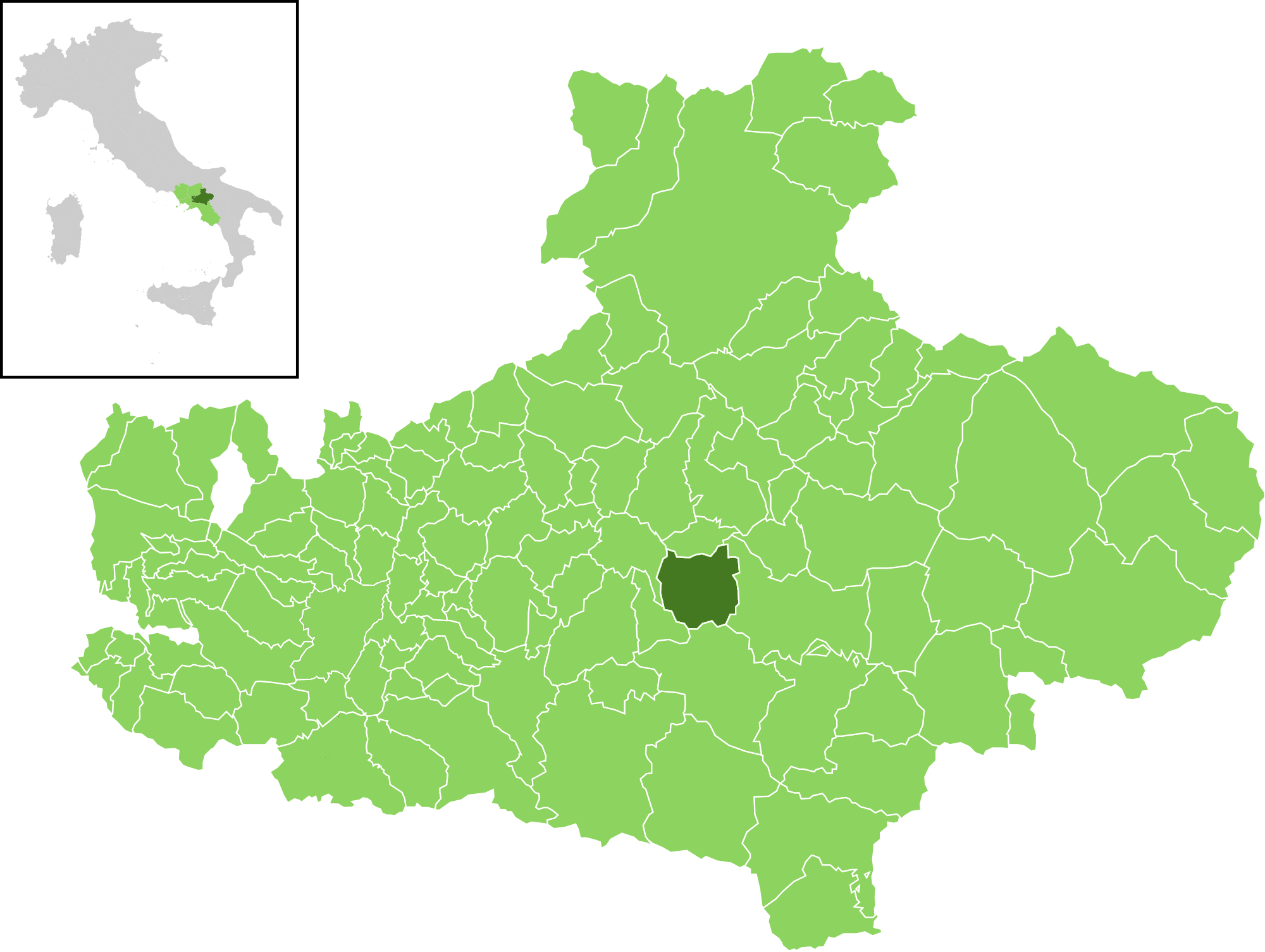
- Torella within the Province of Avellino

- Location within Italy Location within Campania
- Coordinates: 40°56′22.3″N 15°06′49.5″E
- Country: Italy
- Region: Campania
- Province: Avellino (AV)
- Frazioni: Aquara, Piano Marotta, San Vito, Montanaldo, Ss. Giovanni e Paolo.

Government
  - Mayor: Amado Delli Gatti (Civic List, from 2016)

Area
  - Total: 26.57 km^{2} (10.26 sq mi)
- Elevation: 666 m (2,185 ft)

Population (31 December 2017)
  - Total: 2,081
  - Density: 78.32/km^{2} (202.9/sq mi)
- Demonym: Torellesi
- Time zone: UTC+1 (CET)
  - Summer (DST): UTC+2 (CEST)
- Postal code: 83057
- Dialing code: 0827
- Patron saint: St. Eustace
- Saint day: 20 September
- Website: Official website

Torella dei Lombardi is a town and comune in the province of Avellino, Campania, southern Italy.

== History ==
The town was first mentioned in the 9th century as Turella. In 1980, along with many other settlements in the province and the neighbouring areas, was heavily damaged during the Irpinia earthquake.

== Geography ==
Torella is a hillside town located in the middle of Irpinia, close to the sources of the river Ofanto, 11 km west of Lioni and 41 east of Avellino. It borders with the municipalities of Castelfranci, Nusco, Paternopoli, Sant'Angelo dei Lombardi and Villamaina.

== Main sights ==
- The Lombard Candriano Castle, located in the middle of the town.
- The Monumental Fountain (19th century), located in the lower side of the town.

== People ==
- Roberto Roberti (1879–1959), actor, screenwriter and film director. He was the father of Sergio Leone
- Bice Valerian (1886–1969), silent film actress. Born in Rome and died in Torella, she was the mother of Sergio Leone
- Giovanni Preziosi (1881–1945), fascist politician noted for his antisemitism
