= Marion (1920 film) =

1920 film

- Directed by: Roberto Roberti
- Starring: Francesca Bertini
- Release date: 1920
- Country: Italy
- Languages: Silent; Italian intertitles

Marion is a 1920 Italian silent film directed by Roberto Roberti and starring Francesca Bertini.

== Cast ==
- Francesca Bertini
- Giorgio Bonaiti
- Gina Cinquini
- Mary Fleuron
- Mario Parpagnoli

== Bibliography ==
- Cristina Jandelli. Le dive italiane del cinema muto. L'epos, 2006.
