= Adriano Rimoldi =

Italian actor

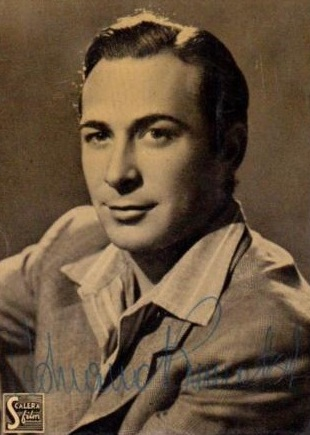
- Born: 3 October 1912; La Spezia, Liguria, Italy
- Died: 19 June 1965 (aged 52); Rome, Lazio, Italy
- Occupation: Actor
- Years active: 1939–1965

Adriano Rimoldi (1912–1965) was an Italian film actor.

== Career ==
Born in La Spezia, Rimoldi started acting on stage while being a student of medicine at the University of Florence. After playing minor film roles, he had his breakout in 1940 as the male lead in the melodrama Goodbye Youth, alongside Maria Denis and Clara Calamai, two of the leading actresses of the Fascist era. After starring in Vittorio De Sica's The Children Are Watching Us he moved to Spain, returning in Italy in 1949. After his return, he failed to regain his status as a film leading actor, being mainly requested in character roles; he then focused on theatre, where he worked with Garinei & Giovannini, Curzio Malaparte and Dino Verde, and on television. He appeared alongside the world-famous comedy duo Laurel and Hardy in their final film Atoll K.

== Selected filmography ==
- A Thousand Lire a Month (1939) - Un impiegato della radio
- Bridge of Glass (1940)
- Il signore della taverna (1940) - Il suo fidanzato
- Kean (1940) - Orazio nell' Amleto
- Miseria e nobiltà (1940) - Il marchesino Eugenio
- Goodbye Youth (1940) - Mario
- The Story of Tosca (1941) - Angelotti
- La compagnia della teppa (1941) - Giorgio Appiani
- Tosca (1941)
- Captain Tempest (1942) - Marcello Corner
- Tragic Night (1942) - Il conte Paolo Martorelli
- The Lion of Damascus (1942) - Marcello Corner
- Perdizione (1942) - Francesco
- Le vie del cuore (1942) - Giorgio Castellani, cugino di Anna
- Loves of Don Juan (1942) - Don Giovanni Tenorio
- Sempre più difficile (1943) - Stefano Turrisi
- Il viaggio del signor Perrichon (1943) - Daniele
- Turbante blanco (1943) - Alejandro Marcos
- La carica degli eroi (1943)
- Carmen (1944) - Marquez, le lieutenant des Dragons / Marquez, il tenente dei Dragoni
- The Children Are Watching Us (1944) - Roberto - l'amante di Nina
- Cabeza de hierro (1944) - Mosca
- Ni pobre, ni rico, sino todo lo contrario (1944) - Abelardo
- Hombres sin honor (1944) - Carlos Aguilar
- A Shadow at the Window (1945) - Luis Carvajal
- ¡Culpable! (1945) - Doctor Fernando Castillo
- El obstáculo (1945) - Enrique Díaz
- Aquel viejo molino (1946)
- Borrasca de celos (1946)
- Sinfonía del hogar (1947)
- Noche sin cielo (1947) - Padre Lorenzo
- Nada (1947) - Jaime
- El ángel gris (1947) - Pedro Pérez
- Anguish (1947) - Marcos
- Alhucemas (1948) - Capitán Suárez
- Las aguas bajan negras (1948) - Nolo
- La vida encadenada (1948)
- Pacto de silencio (1949) - John Brand
- Doce horas de vida (1949) - Miguel
- In a Corner of Spain (1949) - Vladimir
- Hand of Death (1949) - conte Orazio Altieri
- Mistress of the Mountains (1950) - Giàn, il contrabbandiere
- Captain Demonio (1950) - Capitan Demonio
- Dora la espía (1950) - Andres
- Si te hubieses casado conmigo (1950) - Alfonso / Carlos
- Atoll K (1950) - Giovanni Copini
- Red Seal (1950)
- The Reluctant Magician (1951) - Industriale
- The Two Sergeants (1951)
- Final Pardon (1952) - Renato Rocchi
- I, Hamlet (1952) - Marcello
- Voto di marinaio (1953)
- I Always Loved You (1953) - Giorgio
- La figlia del forzato (1953) - pittore Corrado
- Cuore di mamma (1954) - Denny Alescu
- Malagueña (1956) - Don Claudio
- Sendas marcadas (1957) - Inspector Ortega
- Cuatro en la frontera (1958) - don Rafael
- Azafatas con permiso (1959) - Alberto
- Los chicos (1959) - Novio de la vedette
- El precio de la sangre (1960)
- Juventud a la intemperie (1961) - Comisario Torres
- King of Kings (1961) - Melchior
- Han matado a un cadáver (1962) - Juan Planas
- Of Wayward Love (1962) - Il marito (segment "L'avaro")
- Napoleone a Firenze (1964)
- Balearic Caper (1966) - (final film role)

== Bibliography ==
- Goble, Alan. The Complete Index to Literary Sources in Film. Walter de Gruyter, 1999.
