= Vittorio Rossi Pianelli =

Italian film director

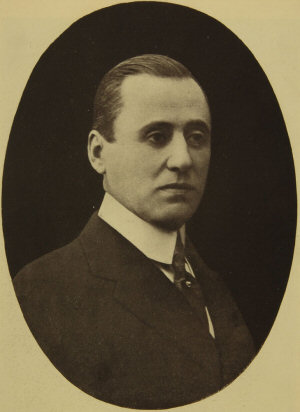
- Born: 9 July 1875; Turin, Piedmont; Italy
- Died: 25 September 1953 (aged 78); Rome, Lazio; Italy
- Other name: Vittorio Rossi
- Occupations: Actor; Director
- Years active: 1910–1940 (film)

Vittorio Rossi Pianelli (9 July 1875 – 25 September 1953) was an Italian stage and film actor and director. He was a prominent figure in early Italian film, appearing in over fifty silent films before 1930. His final appearance was in The Count of Brechard (1940).

A notable role was in Love Everlasting (1914). The film is one of the most important early Italian films. He also directed several films during the 1910s.

== Selected filmography ==
- Cesar Borgia (1912)
- Love Everlasting (1913)
- Floretta and Patapon (1913)
- Nerone e Agrippina (1918)
- La moglie di Claudio (1918)
- Maciste the Policeman (1918)
- Hedda Gabler (1920)
- Latest Night News (1924)
- The Count of Brechard (1940)

== Bibliography ==
- Bayman, Louis & Rigoletto, Sergio. Popular Italian Cinema. Palgrave Macmillan, 2013.
- Moliterno, Gino. Historical Dictionary of Italian Cinema. Scarecrow Press, 2008.
