= Niniche (1918 film) =

- Directed by: Camillo De Riso
- Written by: Albert Millaud (play); Alfred Hennequin (play)
- Starring: Camillo De Riso
- Cinematography: Giuseppe Filippa
- Production company: Caesar Film
- Distributed by: Caesar Film
- Release date: February 1918
- Country: Italy
- Languages: Silent; Italian intertitles

Niniche is a 1918 Italian silent film directed by Camillo De Riso. It adapts the 1878 play of the same name by Albert Millaud and Alfred Hennequin.

== Cast ==
- Camillo De Riso
- Franco Gennaro
- Ines Imbimbo
- Tilde Kassay
- Gustavo Serena

== Reception ==
A 1918 review in La Stampa praised the acting and, above all, the work of the director.

A 1921 review in Il Piccolo di Trieste found the film was a "very pleasant comedy destined to success thanks to the great comedic talent of cinematograph, Camillo de Riso".

== Bibliography ==
- Goble, Alan. The Complete Index to Literary Sources in Film. Walter de Gruyter, 1999.
