= Tower of Terror (1913 film) =

- Directed by: Roberto Roberti
- Starring: Bice Waleran
- Production company: Aquila Films
- Distributed by: Aquila Films
- Release date: 1913
- Country: Italy
- Languages: Silent; Italian intertitles

Tower of Terror (Italian: La torre dell'espiazione) is a 1913 Italian silent film directed by Roberto Roberti and starring Bice Waleran.

== Cast ==
- Antonietta Calderari
- Frederico Elvezi
- Antonio Greco (credited as Signor Greco)
- Giovanni Pezzinga
- Roberto Roberti
- Angiolina Solari
- Bice Waleran

== Bibliography ==
- Aldo Bernardini, Vittorio Martinelli. Il cinema muto italiano, Volume 5, Part 2. Nuova ERI, 1994.
