= Kean (1940 film) =

- Directed by: Guido Brignone
- Written by: Alexandre Dumas (play); Tomaso Smith; Guido Brignone
- Starring: Rossano Brazzi; Germana Paolieri; Sandro Salvini
- Cinematography: Otello Martelli
- Edited by: Giuseppe Fatigati
- Music by: Edgardo Carducci
- Production company: Scalera Film
- Distributed by: Scalera Film
- Release date: 6 April 1940
- Running time: 78 minutes
- Country: Italy
- Language: Italian

Kean is a 1940 Italian historical drama film directed by Guido Brignone and starring Rossano Brazzi, Germana Paolieri. and Sandro Salvini. It is based on the 1836 play Kean by Alexandre Dumas portraying the life of the English actor Edmund Kean.

The film's sets were designed by the art director Alfredo Manzi. It was shot at the Scalera Studios in Rome. The plot follows actor Edmund Kean as he becomes entangled in a romantic rivalry with the Prince of Wales over the affections of a diplomat's wife.

== Cast ==
- Rossano Brazzi as Edmund Kean
- Germana Paolieri as Elena Koeffeld
- Sandro Salvini as Il conte Koeffeld
- Mariella Lotti as Anna Demby
- Filippo Scelzo as Il principe di Galles
- Dino Di Luca as Lord Mewill
- Nicola Maldacea as Salomone, il domestico
- Oreste Fares as Papà Bob
- Dina Sassoli as Evelyn Charleston
- Paolo Ferrari as Pistol, il ragazzino
- Edoardo Borelli as Eastman
- Renato Malavasi as Peter Patt
- Luigi Zerbinati as Dario, il parrucchiere
- Giulio Battiferri as Un acrobata
- Liana Del Balzo as Una invitata al ballo
- Armando Furlai as Un componente del circo
- Lina Marengo as Una donna del circo
- Alfredo Martinelli as Uno spettatore al teatro
- Cesare Polacco as Il medico
- Adriano Rimoldi as Orazio nell' Amleto

== Bibliography ==
- Moliterno, Gino. The A to Z of Italian Cinema. Scarecrow Press, 2009.
