= Eugenia Grandet (1918 film) =

- Directed by: Roberto Roberti
- Based on: Eugénie Grandet by Honoré de Balzac
- Starring: Francesca Bertini
- Production company: Caesar Film
- Distributed by: Caesar Film
- Release date: 1918
- Country: Italy
- Languages: Silent; Italian intertitles

Eugenia Grandet is a 1918 Italian silent historical drama film directed by Roberto Roberti and starring Francesca Bertini. It is based on the 1833 novel Eugénie Grandet by Honoré de Balzac.
