= Giuseppe Barattolo =

Italian film producer

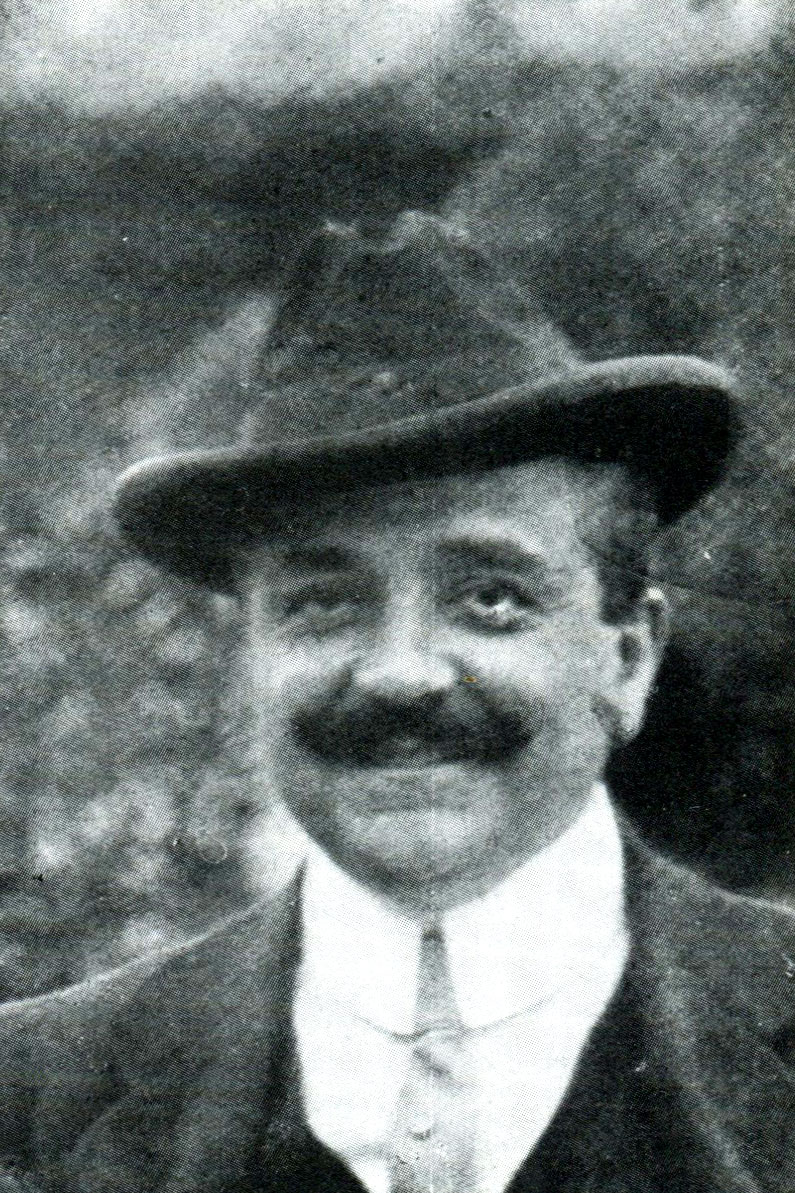
- Born: 1882; Naples, Italy
- Died: 1949 (aged 66–67); Rome, Italy
- Occupation: Producer
- Years active: 1913–1949

Giuseppe Barattolo (1882–1949) was an Italian lawyer, politician and film producer. In 1913, during the silent era, Barattolo founded Caesar Film. Caesar made a series of popular films, some of which starred Francesca Bertini. In 1919 he joined and became an influential figure at the conglomerate Unione Cinematografica Italiana which dominated Italian film production during the early 1920s, but this came to an end following the box office failure of Quo Vadis (1924). In the early 1930s he tried to re-establish Caesar Film as a serious force in Italian production, but this also failed.

During the 1930s, Barattolo lobbied the Fascist government of Italy for aid to rebuild the Italian film industry. He was a strong supporter of the government's plans during the mid-1930s to invest large amounts of money constructing Cinecittà studios in Rome, and during the era he worked at the state-backed Scalera Film. Barattolo was instrumental in attempts to rebuild the Italian film industry in Venice during the Italian Social Republic. After the fall of Benito Mussolini Barattolo worked as an independent producer.

== Selected filmography ==
- Assunta Spina (1915)

== Bibliography ==
- Gundle, Stephen. Mussolini's Dream Factory: Film Stardom in Fascist Italy. Berghan Books, 2013.
- Moliterno, Gino. Historical Dictionary of Italian Cinema. Scarecrow Press, 2008.
