= Achille Consalvi =

Italian actor and film director

- Occupations: Actor, director
- Years active: 1912–1922 (film)

Achille Consalvi was an Italian actor and film director of the silent era.

== Selected filmography ==
- Fedora (1913)
- The Three Musketeers (1913)

== Bibliography ==
- Grace Russo Bullaro. Beyond "Life is Beautiful": Comedy and Tragedy in the Cinema of Roberto Benigni. Troubador Publishing Ltd, 2005.
