= Ermete Novelli =

Italian actor (1851–1919)

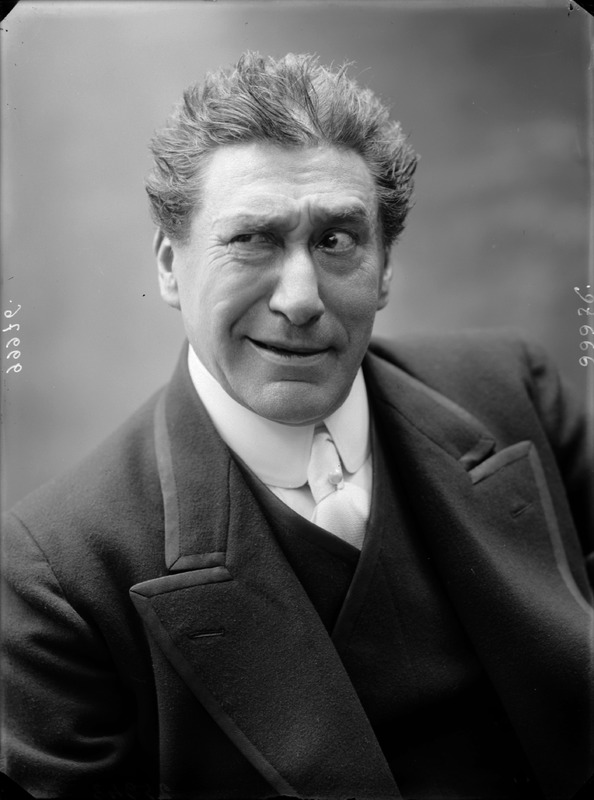
- Born: 5 March 1851; Lucca, Italy
- Died: 30 January 1919 (aged 67); Naples, Italy
- Occupation: Actor

Ermete Novelli (5 March 1851 – 30 January 1919) was an Italian actor and playwright.

Born in Lucca, the son of a prompter, Novelli made his first appearance in 1866, and played character and leading comedy parts in the best companies between 1871 and 1884. By 1885 he had his own company, and made a great success in Paris in 1898 and 1902.

He established a new theatre in Rome in 1900, the Casa di Goldoni, on the lines of the Comédie-Française. He dramatized Émile Gaboriau's Monsieur Lecoq, and alone or in collaboration wrote several comedies and many monologues; his tragedy La Masque, written in collaboration with Bonaspetti, was produced in 1911.

He died in Naples in 1919.

== Selected filmography ==
- King Lear (1910)
