= Sandro Salvini =

Italian actor (1890–1955)

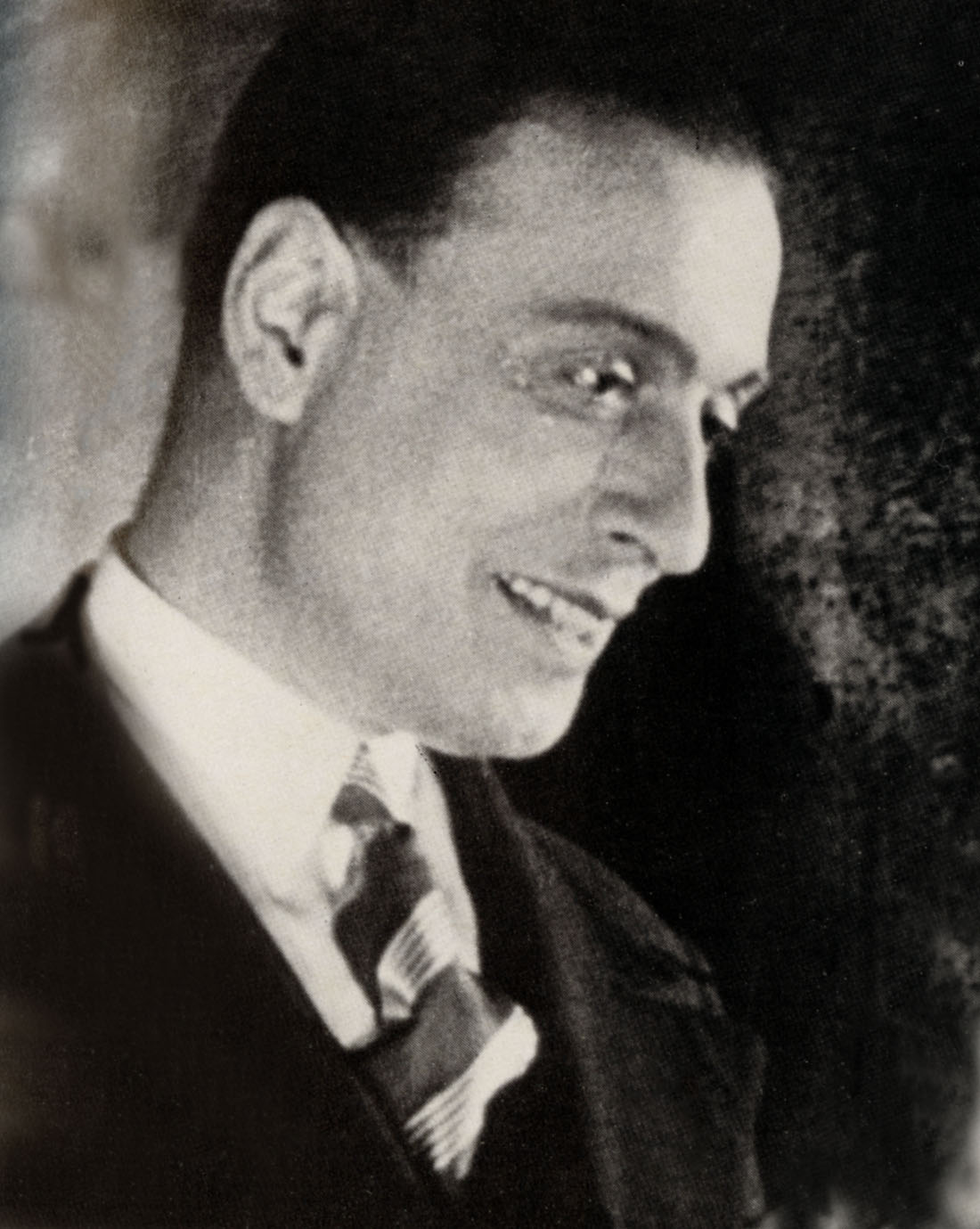
- Salvini in 1933
- Born: 6 August 1890; Pisa, Tuscany, Italy
- Died: 24 July 1955 (aged 64); Rome, Lazio, Italy
- Other name: Alessandro Salvini
- Occupation: Actor
- Years active: 1917–1943 (film)

Sandro Salvini (1890–1955) was an Italian actor. He appeared in around thirty films during the silent and sound eras. He played the lead role of the Duke in Alessandro Blasetti's Mother Earth (1931). His grandfather was the 19th-century Italian stage tragedian Tommaso Salvini.

== Selected filmography ==
- The Thirteenth Man (1917)
- The Conqueror of the World (1919)
- Countess Sarah (1919)
- The Cheerful Soul (1919)
- The Fall of the Curtain (1920)
- The Serpent (1920)
- Little Sister (1921)
- The Stronger Passion (1921)
- Nero (1922)
- The Shepherd King (1923)
- Mother Earth (1931)
- Lorenzino de' Medici (1935)
- Kean (1940)

== Bibliography ==
- Landy, Marcia. The Folklore of Consensus: Theatricality in the Italian Cinema, 1930-1943. SUNY Press, 28 May 1998.
