= Mother Earth (film) =

1931 film

- Directed by: Alessandro Blasetti
- Written by: Goffredo Alessandrini; Camillo Apolloni; Gian Bistolfi; Alessandro Blasetti
- Starring: Leda Gloria; Sandro Salvini; Isa Pola; Olga Capri
- Cinematography: Giulio De Luca; Carlo Montuori
- Edited by: Carlo José Bassoli; Alessandro Blasetti
- Music by: Francesco Balilla Pratella; Pietro Sassoli
- Production company: Società Italiana Cines
- Distributed by: Societa Anonima Stefano Pittaluga
- Release date: April 1931
- Running time: 90 minutes
- Country: Italy
- Language: Italian

Mother Earth (Italian: Terra madre) is a 1931 Italian drama film directed by Alessandro Blasetti and starring Leda Gloria, Sandro Salvini and Isa Pola. It was made at the Cines Studios in Rome. Along with Blasetti's other early films, it shows a strong influence of Soviet-style realism. A country landowner decides to sell up and move to the city, but later has a change of heart. It was part of Fascist Italy's promotion of rural over urban values.

== Cast ==
- Leda Gloria as Emilia
- Sandro Salvini as Il duca Marco
- Isa Pola as Daisy
- Olga Capri as La governante della tenuta
- Vasco Creti Nunzio, Il massaro, padre di Emilia
- Carlo Ninchi as Il commandatore Bordani
- Franco Coop as Silvano, un contadino
- Raimondo Van Riel as Un contadino nella taverna
- Giorgio Bianchi as Il cortegiatore di Daisy
- Ugo Gracci as L'aiutante del massaro
- Umberto Sacripante as Il contadino idiota

== Bibliography ==
- Reich, Jacqueline & Garofalo, Piero. Re-viewing Fascism: Italian Cinema, 1922-1943. Indiana University Press, 2002.
