= Claudia Zambuto =

Italian film actress

- Born: 23 March 1885
- Died: Unknown
- Occupation: Actress
- Years active: 1913-1918 (film)

Claudia Zambuto (23 March 1885–?) was an Italian film actress of the silent era.

== Selected filmography ==
- Fedora (1913)
- La belva della mezzanotte (1913)
- The Princess of Bedford (1914)
- The Bandit of Port Avon (1914)
- The Danube Boatman (1914)
- When Knights Were Bold (1916)
- Maciste the Policeman (1918)

== Bibliography ==
- Goble, Alan. The Complete Index to Literary Sources in Film. Walter de Gruyter, 1999.
