= Ettore Piergiovanni =

Italian actor

- Occupations: Actor, Director
- Years active: 1913-1925 (film)

Ettore Piergiovanni was an Italian film actor active during the silent era. He also directed three films during the early 1920s.

== Selected filmography ==
- Hedda Gabler (1920)
- The Youth of the Devil (1921)

== Bibliography ==
- Goble, Alan. The Complete Index to Literary Sources in Film. Walter de Gruyter, 1999.
