= Magic Village =

1955 film

- Directed by: Jean-Paul Le Chanois
- Written by: Vitaliano Brancati; Vittorio De Seta; Jean-Paul Le Chanois
- Produced by: Francesco Alliata; Jules Borkon; Cino Del Duca; Robert Dorfmann; Pietro Moncada
- Starring: Robert Lamoureux; Lucia Bosè
- Cinematography: Marc Fossard
- Edited by: Emma Le Chanois
- Music by: Joseph Kosma
- Production companies: Del Duca Productions; Champs-Élysées Productions
- Distributed by: Les Films Corona (France)
- Release date: 22 March 1955
- Running time: 95 minutes
- Countries: France; Italy
- Language: French

Magic Village (French: Village magique, Italian:Vacanze d'amore) is a 1955 French-Italian comedy film directed by Jean-Paul Le Chanois and starring Robert Lamoureux and Lucia Bosè. Location shooting took place around Cefalù near Palermo.

== Synopsis ==
Robert, a Parisian, is planning a holiday in Sicily with his new fiancée. However his work means he has to follow on a later train than his fiancée. While travelling he meets Lucienne an attractive Sicilian girl.

== Cast ==
- Robert Lamoureux as Robert
- Lucia Bosé as Thérèse Miceli
- Hélène Rémy as Lucienne Dumas
- Delia Scala as Agatina
- Walter Chiari as Momo
- Umberto Spadaro as Don Puglisi
- Jacqueline Plessis as Colette
- Giovanni Grasso as Sindaco
- Domenico Modugno as Un frère d'Agatina
- Renato Chiantoni
- Yvon Jeanclaude as Pierre
- Giannina Chiantoni
- Germaine de France
- Judith Magre
- Jany Vallières
- René Clermont as L'homme chiffres
- Jean Péméja
- Jeanine Papoudoff
- Robert Rollis
- Clio Sally
- Françoise Hornez
- Jacques Riberolles
- Michel Le Royer
- Pippo Valente
- Rina Franchetti
- Pascale Roberts
- Christiane Dancourt
- Brigitte Elloy
- Colette Jongleux
- Georges Chamarat
- Véronique Deschamps
- Jean-Paul Le Chanois
- Michel Lemoine
- Barbara Mayo
- Marcelle Praince
- Vittoria Crispo as Agatina's mother

== Bibliography ==
- Michele Sancisi. Walter Chiari: un animale da palcoscenico. Mediane, 2011.
