= Tilde Kassay =

Italian film actress

- Tilde Kassay postcards
- Born: Naples, Italy
- Other name: Matilde Cassai
- Occupation: Actress
- Years active: 1915-1921 (film)

Tilde Kassay was an Italian film actress of the silent era.

== Selected filmography ==
- Niniche (1918)
- The Race to the Throne (1919)
- Diana Sorel (1921)

== Bibliography ==
- Goble, Alan. The Complete Index to Literary Sources in Film. Walter de Gruyter, 1999.
