= The Lady of the Camellias (1915 Serena film) =

1915 film by Gustavo Serena

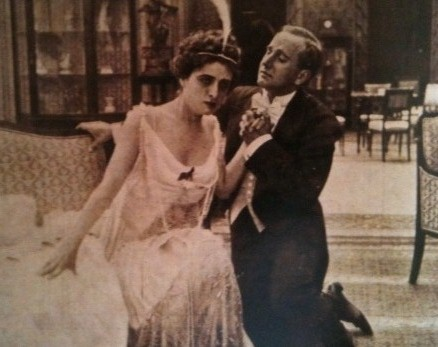
- Directed by: Gustavo Serena
- Written by: Renzo Chiosso
- Based on: The Lady of the Camellias; 1848 novel by Alexandre Dumas fils
- Starring: Francesca Bertini
- Cinematography: Alberto G. Carta
- Production company: Caesar Film
- Distributed by: Caesar Film
- Release date: 22 November 1915
- Running time: 53 minutes
- Country: Italy
- Languages: Silent; Italian intertitles

La signora delle camelie

The Lady of the Camellias (Italian:La signora delle camelie) is a 1915 Italian historical drama film directed by Gustavo Serena and starring Francesca Bertini. It is an adaptation of Alexandre Dumas, fils' novel The Lady of the Camellias.

The film's art direction was by Alfredo Manzi.

== Cast ==
- Carlo Benetti
- Olga Benetti as Madame Duvernoy
- Francesca Bertini as Margherita Gauthier
- Antonio Cruichi as Duval padre
- Camillo De Riso
- Tina Ceccaci Renaldi
- Gustavo Serena as Armando Duval

== Bibliography ==
- Moliterno, Gino. The A to Z of Italian Cinema. Scarecrow Press, 2009.
