= King Lear (1910 film) =

1910 film by Gerolamo Lo Savio

- Directed by: Gerolamo Lo Savio
- Written by: William Shakespeare (play)
- Starring: Francesca Bertini
- Production company: Film d'Arte Italiana
- Distributed by: Pathé Frères
- Release date: 1910
- Country: Italy
- Languages: Silent; Italian intertitles

King Lear (Italian: Re Lear) is a 1910 Italian silent historical drama film directed by Gerolamo Lo Savio and starring Ermete Novelli, Francesca Bertini and Olga Giannini Novelli. It is an adaptation of William Shakespeare's King Lear.

== Cast ==
- Ermete Novelli as King Lear
- Francesca Bertini as Cordelia
- Olga Giannini Novelli as King Lear's Daughter
- Giannina Chiantoni as King Lear's Daughter

== Bibliography ==
- Moliterno, Gino. The A to Z of Italian Cinema. Scarecrow Press, 2009.
