= The Conqueror of the World =

- Directed by: Roberto Roberti
- Starring: Francesca Bertini; Sandro Salvini
- Release date: 1919
- Country: Italy
- Languages: Silent; Italian intertitles

The Conqueror of the World (Italian:Il conquistatore del mondo) is a 1919 Italian silent film directed by Roberto Roberti and starring Francesca Bertini and Sandro Salvini.

== Cast ==
- Francesca Bertini
- Sandro Salvini

== Bibliography ==
- Parish, James Robert. Film Actors Guide. Scarecrow Press, 1977.
