= The Ambassador (1936 film) =

1936 film

- Directed by: Baldassarre Negroni
- Written by: Francesco Pasinetti; Raffaello Matarazzo; Roberto Zerboni
- Based on: 1827 play Le Diplomate by Eugène Scribe; Germain Delavigne
- Produced by: Baldassarre Negroni
- Starring: Leda Gloria; Luisa Ferida; Maurizio D'Ancora
- Cinematography: Otello Martelli
- Edited by: Gilberto Berttochi
- Music by: Pietro Sassoli
- Production company: Negroni Film
- Distributed by: ENIC
- Release date: 3 September 1936
- Running time: 89 minutes
- Country: Italy
- Language: Italian

The Ambassador (Italian: L'ambasciatore) is a 1936 Italian historical comedy film directed by Baldassarre Negroni and starring Leda Gloria, Luisa Ferida and Maurizio D'Ancora.

It was shot at the Safa Palatino Studios in Rome.

== Cast ==
- Leda Gloria as Marchesa di Savignano
- Luisa Ferida as Isabella de Quevedo
- Maurizio D'Ancora as Lelio Di Santelmo
- Cesare Zoppetti as ambasciatore di Spagna
- Enzo Biliotti as ambasciatore di Sassonia
- Romolo Costa as Duca Paolo
- Achille Majeroni as Granduca di Modena
- Vasco Creti as segretario del Duca
- Oreste Bilancia
- Rosanna Schettina
- Tina Lattanzi
- Rosetta Calavetta

== Bibliography ==
- Roberto Chiti & Roberto Poppi. I film: Tutti i film italiani dal 1930 al 1944. Gremese Editore, 2005.
