= Bice Waleran =

Italian film actress (1886–1969)

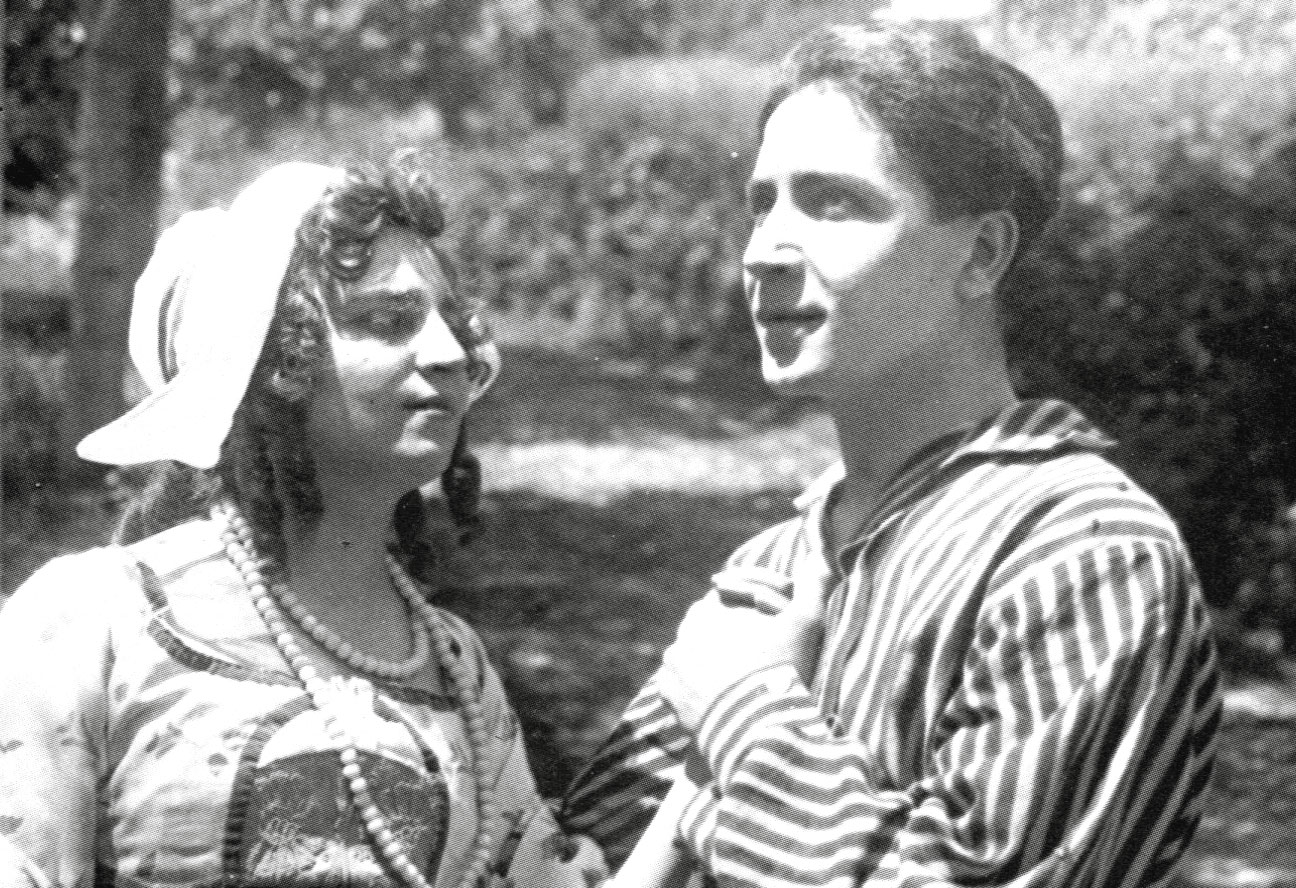
- Waleran (left) with Luigi Pavese in La Vampa (1916)
- Born: Edvige Maria Valcarenghi; 8 May 1886; Rome, Lazio, Kingdom of Italy
- Died: 1969 (aged 82–83); Torella dei Lombardi, Campania, Italy
- Other name: Bice Valerian
- Occupation: Actress
- Years active: 1912–1917 (film)
- Spouse: Roberto Roberti
- Children: Sergio Leone

Edvige Maria Valcarenghi (8 May 1886 – 1969), known professionally as Bice Waleran or Bice Valerian, was an Italian film actress of the silent era. She was the wife of the actor and director Roberto Roberti and the mother of filmmaker Sergio Leone.

== Selected filmography ==
- A Victim of Vengeance (1913)
- The Mystery of St. Martin's Bridge (1913)
- Tower of Terror (1913)
- Indian Vampire (1913)
- The Bandit of Port Avon (1914)
- The Princess of Bedford (1914)
- The Danube Boatman (1914)
- Theodora (1914)
- The Cavalcade of Dreams (1917)
