= Beatrice (1919 film) =

- Directed by: Herbert Brenon
- Written by: Dante Alighieri
- Starring: Francesca Bertini
- Release date: 1919
- Country: Italy
- Languages: Silent; Italian intertitles

Beatrice is a 1919 Italian silent historical film directed by Herbert Brenon and starring Francesca Bertini. It tells the story of Dante Alighieri's love to Beatrice Portinari, loosely based on Dante's poetry. It appears to be a separate film from Brenon's 1921 film The Stronger Passion, which also had the original title of Beatrice although they may be alternative versions of the same production.

== Bibliography ==
- Phillips, Alastair & Vincendeau, Ginette. Journeys of Desire: European Actors in Hollywood. British Film Institute, 2006.
