= Beatrice, Humboldt County, California =

Coordinates: 40°40′11″N 124°12′09″W

Beatrice (formerly Salmon Creek) is a locality in Humboldt County, California. It lies at an elevation of 16 feet (4.9 m).

The original name of Salmon Creek was changed to Beatrice when the first post office opened in 1884 in honor of its first postmaster Beatrice White. The Beatrice post office closed for good in 1955.
