= Giannina Chiantoni =

Italian actress (1881–1972)

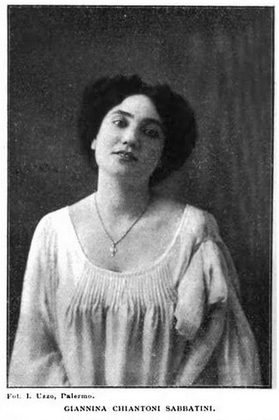
- Giannina Chiantoni, from a 1907 publication.
- Born: 24 June 1881; Bernalda, Italy
- Died: 17 May 1972 (aged 90); Bologna, Italy
- Occupation: Actress
- Years active: 1910–1955

Giannina Chiantoni (24 June 1881 – 17 May 1972) was an Italian actress. She appeared in more than twelve films from 1910 to 1955.

== Selected filmography ==
Year	Title	Role	Notes
1910	King Lear		
1933	Mr. Desire		
1937	Doctor Antonio	Rosa	
1937	The Countess of Parma		
1955	Magic Village	Sindaco	
