= Beatrice, West Virginia =

Unincorporated community in West Virginia, United States

Beatrice
- Unincorporated community
- Location within the state of West Virginia Beatrice (the United States)
- Coordinates: 39°5′2″N 81°8′23″W
- Country: United States
- State: West Virginia
- County: Ritchie
- Elevation: 676 ft (206 m)
- Time zone: UTC-5 (Eastern (EST))
  - Summer (DST): UTC-4 (EDT)
- GNIS ID: 1535438

Beatrice is an unincorporated community in Ritchie County, West Virginia, United States. Its post office closed in 1967.

The community was named after Beatrice Haught, a relative of an early settler.
