= Camillo De Riso =

Italian actor and film director (1854–1924)

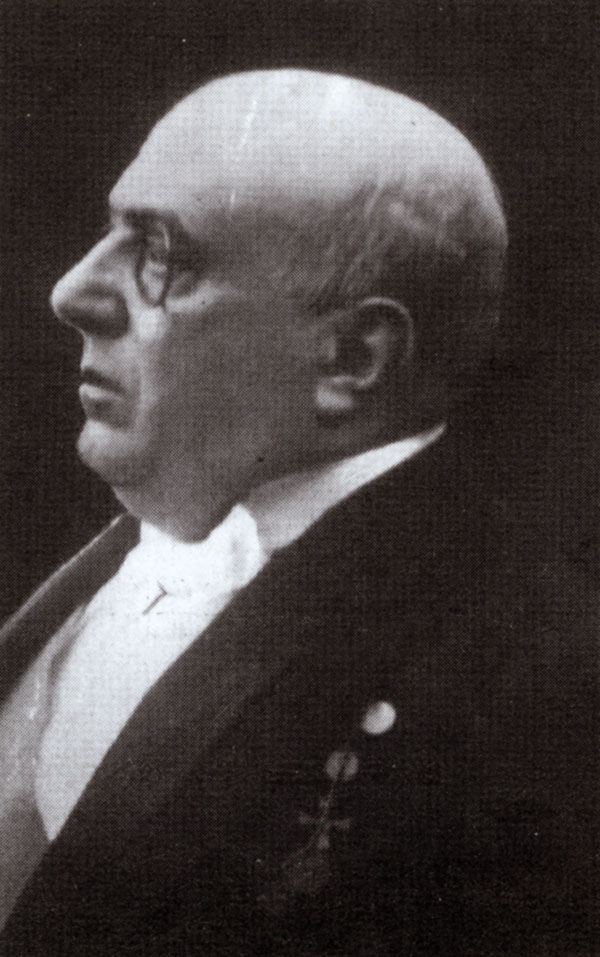
- Camillo De Riso ca. 1920
- Born: 20 November 1854; Naples, Campania, Kingdom of the Two Sicilies
- Died: 2 July 1924 (aged 69); Rome, Lazio, Kingdom of Italy
- Occupations: Actor, director
- Years active: 1912–1924 (film)

Camillo De Riso (1854–1924) was an Italian actor and film director.

Camillo De Riso, a native from Naples died in Rome on 2 July 1924.

== Selected filmography ==
- Love Everlasting (1913)
- Floretta and Patapon (1913)
- The Lady of the Camellias (1915)
- Odette (1916)
- Niniche (1918)
- Mariute (1918)
- Take Care of Amelia (1925)

== Bibliography ==
- Goble, Alan. The Complete Index to Literary Sources in Film. Walter de Gruyter, 1999.
