= Diana Sorel (film) =

1921 film

- Directed by: Gustavo Serena
- Starring: Tilde Kassay
- Cinematography: Arturo Busnego
- Production company: Libertas Film
- Distributed by: Libertas Film
- Release date: May 1921
- Country: Italy
- Languages: Silent; Italian intertitles

Diana Sorel is a 1921 Italian silent film directed by Gustavo Serena and starring Tilde Kassay.

== Cast ==
- Irma Berrettini
- Gino D'Attino
- Silvana Di San Giorgio
- Tilde Kassay as Diana Sorel
- Gustavo Serena
- Pier Camillo Tovagliari

== Bibliography ==
- Aldo Bernardini & Vittorio Martinelli. Il cinema muto italiano: I film degli anni venti, 1921. Nuova ERI, 1996.
