= Beatrice (novel) =

1890 novel by H. Rider Haggard

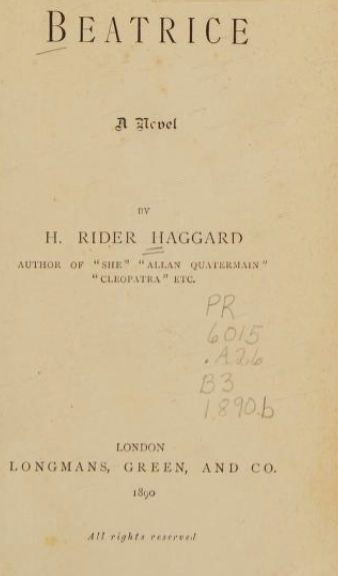
- Title page for Beatrice (1890)
- Author: H. Rider Haggard
- Language: English
- Publisher: Longmans
- Publication date: 1890
- Publication place: United Kingdom

Beatrice is an 1890 novel by the British writer H. Rider Haggard. The author later called it "one of the best bits of work I ever did."

== Reception ==
It is much the most successful non-African thing he has done; and the best parts of it are better than all but the very best parts of his African stories and higher than even these in attempt.

== Adaptation ==
The book was adapted into a 1921 film called The Stronger Passion.
