= Beatrice, Georgia =

Unincorporated community in Georgia, U.S.

Coordinates: 32°00′26″N 84°54′18″W

Beatrice is an unincorporated community in Stewart County, in the U.S. state of Georgia.

== History ==
A post office called Beatrice was established in 1900, and remained in operation until 1905. The community was located inland away from railroads.
