= L'accidia =

1919 film

L'accidia is an Italian black-and-white film. It was released in January 1919 by director Alfredo De Antoni. The film's title translates into English as "Sloth".

== Plot ==
Engineer Ottavio Fortis returns to his homeland where nothing changes and laziness reigns, and there he meets Bianca again. Bianca, still unmarried, is considering a proposal that would make her become a duchess. Doubtful between love and wealth, she will have anyway something to regret.
