= Roberto Roberti =

Italian actor, screenwriter and film director

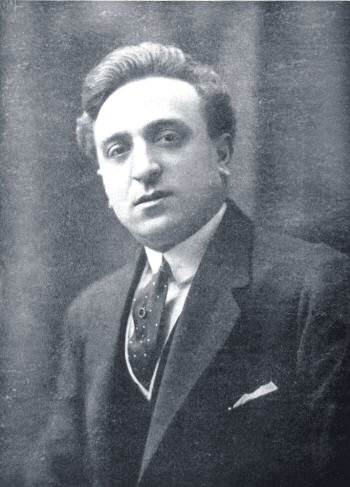
- Roberti in 1918
- Born: Vincenzo Leone; 24 July 1879; Torella dei Lombardi, Campania, Kingdom of Italy
- Died: 10 January 1959 (aged 79); Torella dei Lombardi, Campania, Italy
- Occupations: Actor; writer; director
- Years active: 1911–1950 (film)
- Spouse: Bice Waleran
- Children: Sergio Leone

Vincenzo Leone (24 July 1879 – 10 January 1959), known professionally as Roberto Roberti, was an Italian actor, screenwriter and film director. He made over sixty films, mostly during the silent era. He was married to the actress Bice Waleran. Their son Sergio Leone became a celebrated director.

During the 1910s Roberti made a number of films for the Turin-based Aquila Films, often featuring his wife in a leading role. He then moved to Caesar Film where he directed eighteen films starring the diva Francesca Bertini.

== Selected filmography ==
- Tower of Terror (1913)
- Indian Vampire (1913)
- The Mystery of St. Martin's Bridge (1913)
- The Princess of Bedford (1914)
- The Bandit of Port Avon (1914)
- The Danube Boatman (1914)
- Theodora (1914)
- Darkness (1916)
- The Sinful Woman (1916)
- The Cavalcade of Dreams (1917)
- Eugenia Grandet (1918)
- The Conqueror of the World (1919)
- Countess Sarah (1919)
- The Cheerful Soul (1919)
- The Race to the Throne (1919)
- Marion (1920)
- Maddalena Ferat (1920)
- The Sphinx (1920)
- The Serpent (1920)
- The Shadow (1920)
- The Fall of the Curtain (1920)
- The Fear of Love (1920)
- Princess Giorgio (1920)
- The Last Dream (1921)
- The Youth of the Devil (1921)
- The Girl from Amalfi (1921)
- The Nude Woman (1922)
- Consuelita (1925)
- When Naples Sings (1926)
- Assunta Spina (1930)
- The Silent Partner (1939)
- The Man on the Street (1941)
- The Mad Marechiaro (1952)
