= The Clemenceau Affair =

1917 film

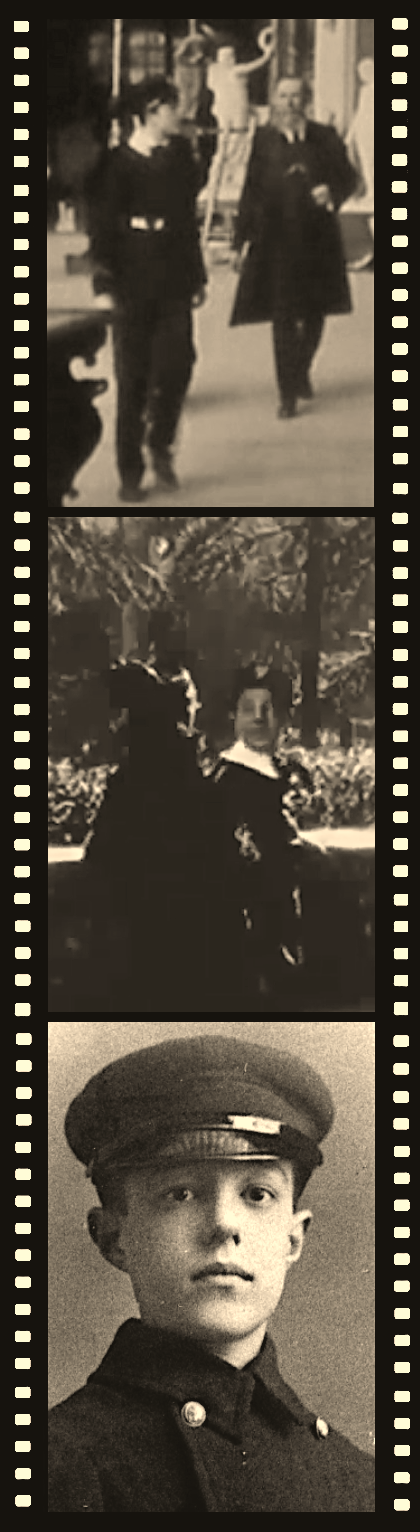
- Still images of Vittorio De Sica from the film
- Directed by: Alfredo De Antoni
- Written by: Alexandre Dumas, fils (novel); Alfredo De Antoni; Giuseppe Paolo Pacchierotti
- Starring: Francesca Bertini
- Cinematography: Alberto G. Carta
- Release date: 28 September 1917
- Country: Italy
- Language: Silent

The Clemenceau Affair (Italian: Il processo Clémenceau) is a 1917 silent Italian adventure film directed by Alfredo De Antoni, based on the novel L'Affaire Clémenceau by Alexandre Dumas fils. The film features the first onscreen performance from Vittorio De Sica.

== Plot ==
The movie is framed as a letter from sculptor Pierre Clémenceau to his lawyer as he awaits trial. Since he was young, he was in love with the Countess Iza Dobronowska, a beautiful girl who nonetheless dreams of wealth and fortune. They become engaged, but Iza is abruptly pulled away to Poland by her aunt Matilda who claims to have regained their family fortune.

In Poland, Iza forgets Pierre and seduces Prince Serge, but Serge's father finds out, separates them, and sends Iza and Matilda to a poor provincial town. Meanwhile, Pierre has become a famous artist—Iza, upon learning this, writes to him to come save her. Pierre brings her to Paris with him, where they marry, but Matilda and Serge plot to steal Iza back from him with the promise of unbridled wealth. Iza lets herself be tempted, and abandons Pierre.

Some time later, Pierre encounters Iza again. They have a last passionate night of love, before Pierre kills her with a dagger and turns himself in.

== Production and release ==
The final scenes of Il processo Clémenceau, in which Pierre Clémenceau approaches Iza with a dagger behind his back, kisses her, and stabs her to death, were cut by the censors before the film could be released. The film was divided into two parts: the first, Iza bimba (Iza the girl) was released on June 13, 1917; the second, Iza donna (Iza the woman), was released on June 20, 1917.

== Reception ==
Mario Consalvo, writing for La Tribuna, praised Bertini's performance: "hers was a true and magnificent victory," he wrote; "undoubtedly the greatest since she began her triumphant reign as the queen of silent cinema".

Pier da Castello in La vita cinematografica was more critical of Bertini, saying that onscreen she gave off an "overly insistent projection of her own 'self' in every film" that detracted from the pacing. While da Castello also praised the supporting cast, the staging, and the cinematography, he wrote that the adaption did not live up to Dumas's work, and that the film was at times "verbose and interminably long".

== Cast ==
- Francesca Bertini as Iza
- Gina Cinquini
- Antonio Cruichi
- Alfredo De Antoni as Costantino
- Vittorio De Sica as a young Pierre Clémenceau
- Arnold Kent as Sergio (as Lido Manetti)
- Nella Montagna as Matilde
- Gustavo Serena as Pierre Clémenceau
