= Francesca Bertini =

Italian silent film actress (1892–1985)

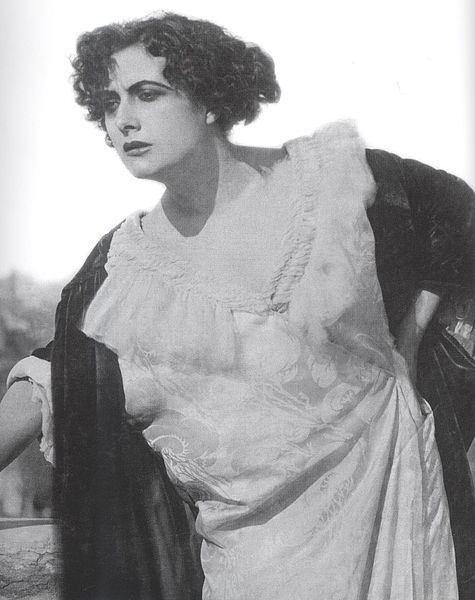
- Bertini in the movie Assunta Spina (1915)
- Born: Elena Seracini Vitiello; 5 January 1892; Prato, Kingdom of Italy
- Died: 13 October 1985 (aged 93); Rome, Italy
- Occupation: Actress
- Spouse: Paul Cartier

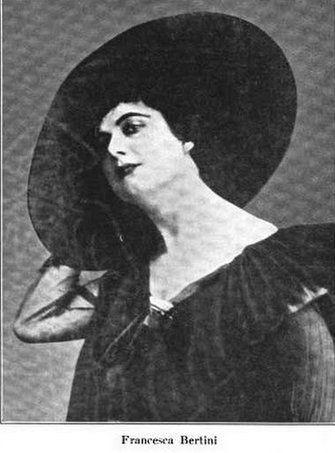
Francesca Bertini, from a 1917 publication

Francesca Bertini (born Elena Seracini Vitiello; 5 January 1892 – 13 October 1985) was an Italian silent film actress. She was one of the most successful silent film stars in the first quarter of the twentieth-century.

== Early life ==
Born Elena Seracini Vitiello in Prato, her mother was the unmarried Adelina di Venanzio Fratiglioni, who may have been an actress. Bertini was registered as Elena Taddei at an orphanage in 1892. Her mother married Arturo Vitiello in 1910. She took his family name.

== Career ==
Bertini began performing on stages and at the age of seventeen she began to perform in the just-born Italian movie production. She had a major role in Salvatore Di Giacomo's melodramatic story Assunta Spina.

She had made over 50 films by 1915 including, Histoire d'un pierrot, was under the direction of Baldassarre Negroni in 1913. Gradually she developed her beauty and elegance, plus a strong, intense, and charming personality, which would be the key of her success as a silent movie actress. With Assunta Spina in 1915 she took care of the scripts as well as performing the role of the main character. Bertini was to claim with some support that she was the true director of the film which included novel acting techniques.

She was one of the first film actresses to focus on reality, rather than on a dramatic stereotype, an anticipation of Neorealistic canons. The expression of authentic feelings was the key of her success through many films. She could perform with success the languid decadent heroine as well as the popular common woman. Other important roles were Odette, Fedora, Tosca and the Lady of the Camellias.

In 1920, Fox Film Corporation in Hollywood offered to sign a contract with her, but she refused: she was married to the wealthy Swiss banker Paul Cartier and wanted to move with him to Switzerland. When her husband died, she moved back to Rome, where she would remain until her death.

She stepped into sound movies as well, but in the meantime the Italian cinema had changed greatly (the period of Telefoni bianchi comedies) and entered into a period of crisis with fascism and censorship. It experienced a definite hiatus with World War II.

== Later years ==
In 1974 Bernardo Bertolucci was able to convince her to emerge from her stubborn silence, accepting a role of a nun in his movie Novecento. She allowed herself to be interviewed in 1981 and this was adapted for a three part TV documentary in 1982. She died in Rome at the age of 93.

== Filmography ==
| Year | Title | Role | Notes |
|---|---|---|---|
| 1908 | La dea del mare | | Film debut Lost film |
| 1910 | The Troubadour (orig. Il trovatore) | | Short film Lost film |
| 1910 | Salomè | Young slave | Short film |
| 1910 | Folchetto di Narbona | | Short film Lost film |
| 1910 | Pia de' Tolomei | | Short film |
| 1910 | La morte civile | | Short film |
| 1910 | Lucrezia Borgia | Lucrezia Borgia | |
| 1910 | King Lear (orig. Re Lear) | Cordelia | Short film |
| 1910 | Francesca da Rimini | | Short film |
| 1910 | Il mercante di Venezia | | Short film |
| 1911 | Cola di Rienzo | Clelia | Short film |
| 1911 | Tristan and Isolde (orig. Tristano e Isotta) | Isolda | Short film |
| 1911 | The Countess of Challant (orig. La contessa di Challant e Don Pedro di Cordova) | Countess de Challant | Short film |
| 1911 | Hernani (orig. Ernani) | Doña Sol | Short film Lost film |
| 1911 | Marco Visconti | | Short film |
| 1911 | Manon Lescaut | | |
| 1911 | The Plot of Fieschi (orig. La congiura di Fieschi) | | Short film |
| 1911 | Lorenzaccio | | |
| 1912 | Florentine Drama (orig. Un dramma a Firenze) | Elisabetta Marmorai | Short film |
| 1912 | Romeo and Juliet (orig. Romeo e Giulietta) | Giulietta | |
| 1912 | Beatrix d'Este (orig. Beatrice d'Este) | Beatrix d'Este | Short film |
| 1912 | The Wandering Minstrel (orig. Suonatori ambulanti) | | Short film Lost film |
| 1912 | Ruy Blas | | Short film Lost film |
| 1912 | The Red Falcon (orig. Il falco rosso) | | |
| 1912 | The Carbonari (orig. I carbonari) | | |
| 1912 | Tragedy at the Court of Milan (orig. Una tragedia alla corte di Milano) | | |
| 1912 | Un amore di Pietro de' Medici | Margherita | Short film Lost film |
| 1912 | Rameses, King of Egypt (orig. La rosa di Tebe) | Selime detta la rosa di Tebe | Lost film |
| 1912 | Cesare Borgia | | Short film Role unconfirmed |
| 1912 | Il fascino della violenza | | Short film |
| 1912 | All on a Summer's Day (orig. Le due scommesse) | | Short film Lost film |
| 1912 | Il pappagallo della zia Berta | | Role unconfirmed |
| 1912 | Ritratto dell'amata | | Short film |
| 1912 | Tragic Flirtation (orig. Tragico amore) | | Short film Lost film |
| 1912 | L'avvoltoio | Maria | |
| 1912 | Panne d'auto | | Short film |
| 1912 | Tears and Smiles (orig. Lacrime e sorrisi) | | Short film Lost film |
| 1912 | Idillio tragico | | |
| 1912 | Supreme Sacrifice (orig. Per la sua gioia) | | Short film |
| 1912 | Lucrezia Borgia | | |
| 1912 | Primavera ed autunno | | Lost film |
| 1913 | The Bondage of Evil (orig. In faccia al destino) | La modista Elena | Short film |
| 1913 | Per il blasone | | Short film Lost film |
| 1913 | Il diavolo e l'acqua santa | | Lost film |
| 1913 | The Price of Silence (orig. La cricca dorata) | Elena Molinari | Short film Lost film |
| 1913 | Ninì Verbena | Ninì Verbena | Lost film |
| 1913 | The Land of Promise (orig. La terra promessa) | Betty Reed | |
| 1913 | L'ultima carta | | Short film Lost film |
| 1913 | Venomous Tongues (orig. Il veleno delle parole) | | |
| 1913 | La maestrina | | Short film |
| 1913 | Broken Idol a.k.a. The Artist's Model (orig. Idolo infranto) | La pastorelle Francesca | |
| 1913 | Tramonto | | Lost film |
| 1913 | His Symphony (orig. La gloria) | La Principessa Louise | Short film Lost film |
| 1913 | La suocera | | Short film |
| 1913 | Vigilia di Natale | | Short film Lost film |
| 1913 | The Forbidden Trail (orig. La donna altrui) | Franca | Short film Lost film |
| 1913 | Il filo di perle | | Lost film |
| 1913 | La bufera | Maria | |
| 1913 | L'arrivista | | |
| 1913 | L'arma dei vigliacchi | La maestra Noemi | Lost film |
| 1913 | L'anima del demi-monde | | |
| 1914 | Pierrot the Prodigal (orig. L'Histoire d'un Pierrot) | Pierrot | |
| 1914 | The Woman Who Dared (orig. L'amazzone mascherata) | Countess Franca De Roberti | |
| 1914 | Cabiria | | |
| 1914 | L'onestà che uccide | | Short film Lost film |
| 1914 | Rose e spine | | |
| 1914 | La principessa straniera | | Lost film |
| 1914 | On Temptation's Trail | | Short film |
| 1914 | Blue Blood (orig. Sangue Blu) | La principessa Elena di Monte Cabello | |
| 1914 | The Song of the Soul (orig. La canzone di Werner) | | Lost film |
| 1914 | Una donna | | |
| 1915 | Nelly the gigolette, or the dancer of the black tavern (orig. Nelly La Gigolette) | Nelly | Lost film |
| 1915 | Hypocrites | Aristocratic Woman | Uncredited role |
| 1915 | Nella fornace | Elena Duroc | Lost film Also Screenwriter |
| 1915 | Il capestro degli Asburgo | La fidanzata di Guglielmo | Lost film |
| 1915 | Ivonne, la bella danzatrice | La contessina Edith / Ivonne, la bella della danza brutale | Lost film |
| 1915 | The Lady of the Camellias (orig. La signora delle camelie) | Margherita Gauthier | |
| 1915 | Assunta Spina | Assunta Spina | Also director |
| 1915 | Don Pietro Caruso | | Lost film |
| 1915 | Diana the Seductress (orig. Diana, l'affascinatrice) | Diana | |
| 1916 | Odette | Odette | |
| 1916 | La perla del cinema | Zingarella | Lost film Also Screenwriter |
| 1916 | La colpa altrui | | Lost film |
| 1916 | Eroismo d'amore | | Short film Lost film |
| 1916 | Il destino | | |
| 1916 | Lacrymae rerum | | Lost film |
| 1916 | Vittima dell'ideale | | |
| 1916 | Nel gorgo della vita | | |
| 1916 | Maligno riflesso | | |
| 1916 | L'educanda monella a.k.a. Baby l'indiavolata | | Lost film Also Screenwriter |
| 1916 | Il patto | | |
| 1916 | Fedora | Fedora | |
| 1917 | Andreina | Andreina – contessa di Toeplitz | Lost film |
| 1917 | La piccola fonte | Teresa | Lost film |
| 1917 | The Clemenceau Affair (orig. Il processo Clémenceau) | Iza | |
| 1917 | Malìa | Liliana di Sant'Elmo | Lost film |
| 1917 | Anima redenta | | |
| 1918 | Tosca | Floria Tosca | |
| 1918 | Frou-frou | Gilberta Sartorys detta Frou – Frou | |
| 1918 | Mariute | Francesca Bertini / La contadina Mariute | Short film Also producer |
| 1918 | La gola | Comtessa Frescalinda Ciufettino | Part 1 of serial I sette peccati capitali Also producer |
| 1918 | L'Orgoglio a.k.a. Superbia | Erminia de Beaumesnil | Part 2 of serial I sette peccati capitali Also producer |
| 1918 | L'ira | Elena | Part 3 of serial I sette peccati capitali Also producer |
| 1918 | L'avarizia | Maria Lorini | Part 4 of serial I sette peccati capitali Also producer |
| 1918 | Eugenia Grandet | | |
| 1919 | L'invidia | Lelia di Santa Croce | Part 5 of serial I sette peccati capitali Also producer |
| 1919 | L'accidia | Bianca Fanello | Part 6 of serial I sette peccati capitali Also producer |
| 1919 | His Friend's Wife (orig. Spiritismo) | Simone | Also producer |
| 1919 | La lussuria | Magdalena Dutertre | Part 7 of serial I sette peccati capitali Also producer |
| 1919 | The Octopus (orig. La Piovra) | Daria Oblosky | Also producer |
| 1919 | The Cheerful Soul (orig. Anima allegra) | | Also producer |
| 1919 | Countess Sarah (orig. La contessa Sara) | Sara | Short film Also producer |
| 1919 | The Conqueror of the World (orig. Il conquistadore del mondo) | | |
| 1919 | Beatrice a.k.a. The Stronger Passion | | |
| 1920 | The Serpent a.k.a. The Poison Mood (orig. La serpe) | | Also producer |
| 1920 | Princess Giorgio | | Lost film Also producer |
| 1920 | The Fall of the Curtain (orig. Lisa Fleuron) | | Lost film Also producer |
| 1920 | The Shadow (orig. L'ombra) | | Lost film Also producer |
| 1920 | The Sphinx (orig. La sfinge) | | Also producer |
| 1920 | Marion (orig. Marion, artista di caffè-concerto) | Marion | Also producer |
| 1920 | Maddalena Ferat | Maddalena Ferat | Also producer |
| 1920 | La ferita | | Lost film Also producer |
| 1920 | Anima selvaggia | | |
| 1920 | Amore di donna | | |
| 1921 | Oltre la legge | | |
| 1921 | The Girl from Amalfi (orig. La fanciulla di Amalfi | | |
| 1921 | La donna, il diavolo, il tempo | | |
| 1921 | Amore vince sempre | | |
| 1921 | The Knot (orig. Il nodo) | | Also producer |
| 1921 | The Last Dream (orig. Ultimo sogno) | Maria | Lost film Also producer |
| 1922 | The Nude Woman (orig. La donna nuda) | Lolette | Lost film Also producer |
| 1922 | Fatale bellezza | | Lost film Also producer |
| 1924 | The Youth of the Devil (orig. La giovinezza del diavolo) | La vecchia duchessa / Fausta | Lost film Also producer |
| 1925 | Fior di levante | | Lost film Also producer |
| 1925 | Consuelita | Consuelita | Also producer |
| 1927 | La Fin De Monte Carlo | Cora de Marsa | Lost film |
| 1928 | Odette (orig. Mein Leben für das Deine) | Odette | |
| 1929 | La Possession | Jessie Cordier | Lost film |
| 1929 | Tu M'Appartiens! | Gisele | |
| 1931 | La Femme d'une nuit | La princesse Hélène de Lystrie | French-language version of La donna di una notte Lost film |
| 1931 | La donna di una notte | La principessa Elena di Lystria | Italian-language version of La Femme d'une nuit Lost film |
| 1934 | Odette (orig. Mein Leben für das Deine) | Odette | Lost film |
| 1943 | Dora, la espía | La principessa | |
| 1957 | A sud niente di nuovo | | |
| 1969 | Una ragazza di Praga | Gabriela | |
| 1976 | 1900 (orig. Novocento) | Sister Desolata | Final film role |
| 1982 | Behind the Screen: Stories of Cinema – The Last Diva (orig. L'ultima diva: Francesca Bertini) | Herself | TV movie documentary |
