= Aquila Films =

Aquila Films was a Turin-based Italian film production and distribution company of the silent era. It was formed in 1907. The company produced many crime and mystery films, promoting them in a sensationalist way. The company's production expanded rapidly - rising from five films in 1907 to seventy three by 1911. Aquila established strong links with foreign distributors in Britain and France, and enjoyed commercial success in foreign markets. In 1909 it took part in the Paris Film Congress, a failed attempt to create a cartel of leading European producers. It was badly hit by the outbreak of the First World War which closed many of its profitable export markets to it. The company had folded by 1917.

Amongst the directors who worked most frequently at the studio was Roberto Roberti who made several films featuring his actress wife Bice Valerian.

== Bibliography ==
- Abel, Richard. Encyclopedia of Early Cinema. Taylor & Francis, 2005.
