= Caesar Film =

Italian film company

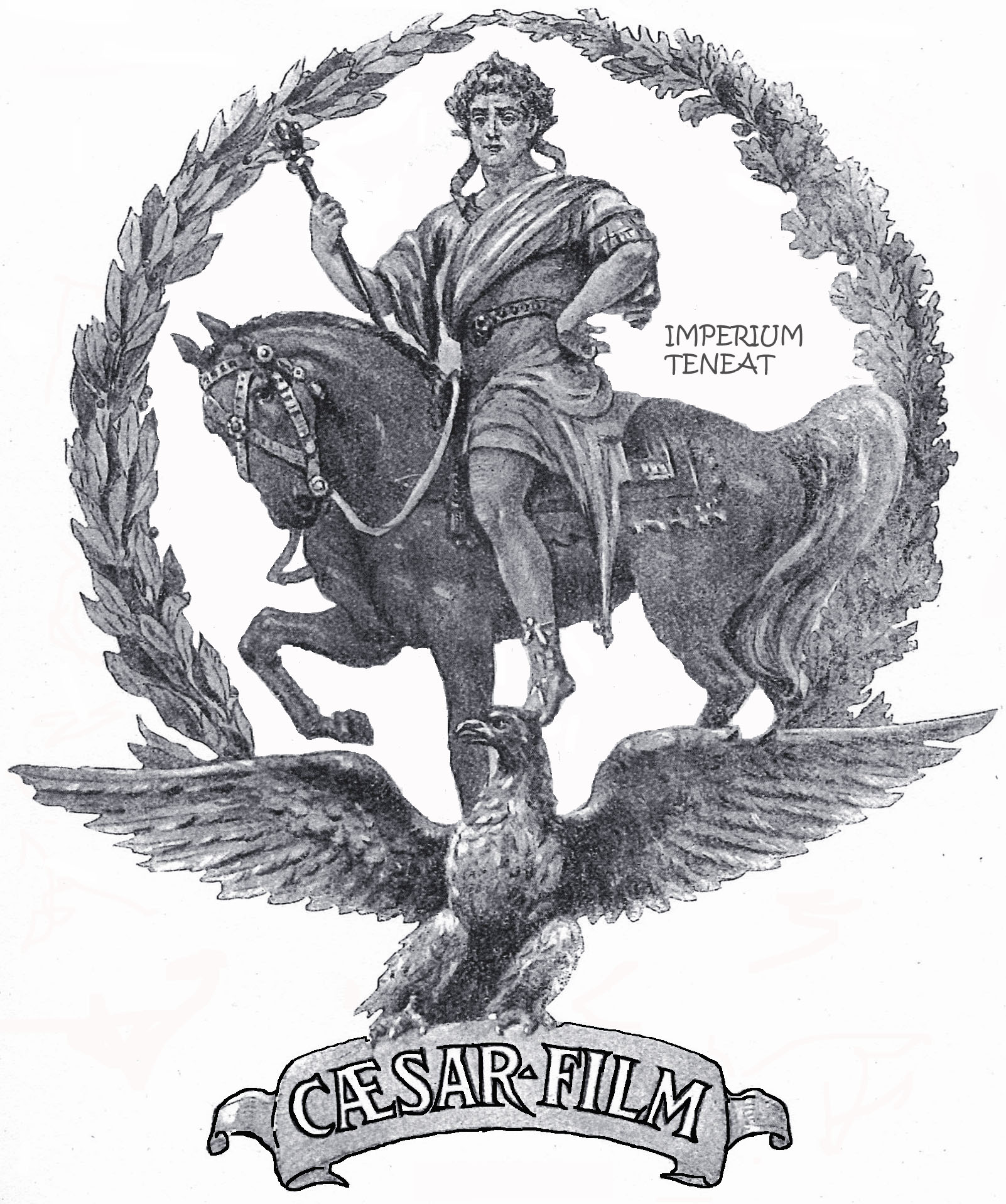
Caesar Film logo, 1915.

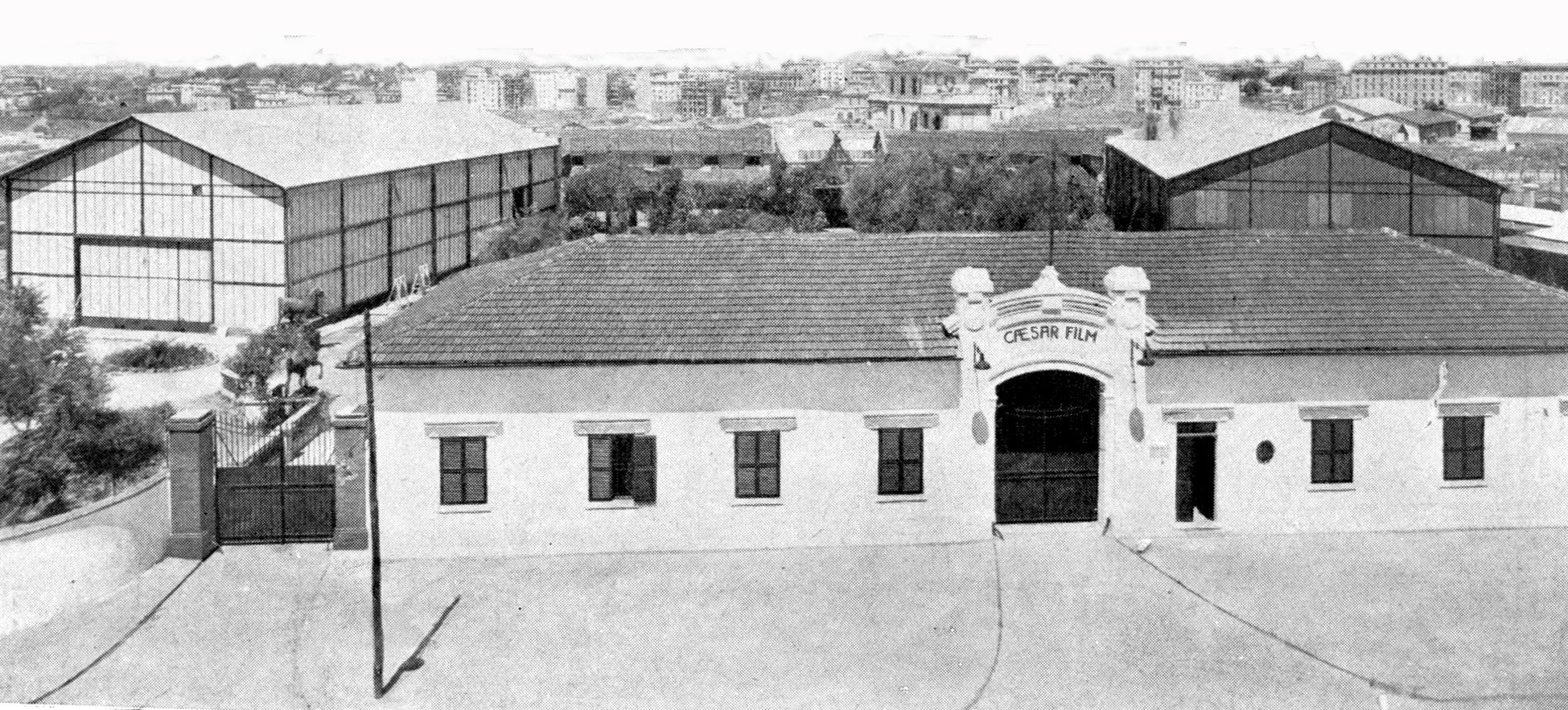
The company's Rome Studios in 1931.

Caesar Film was an Italian film production and distribution company founded in 1913. The studio's owner Giuseppe Barattolo built it into one of the more successful silent film companies of the 1910s, thanks partly to signing up the diva Francesca Bertini to make a series of films.

Following the crisis in Italian production that followed the First World War, Barattolo took Caesar in as a member of the giant consortium Unione Cinematografica Italiana which pooled the resources of several major film producers. However the collapse of this company in 1925 left Caesar struggling. Following a boom in production following the arrival of sound in 1930, Barattolo relaunched Caesar and made several films without restoring it to its former strength. Barattolo subsequently became involved with Scalera Film, which was financially backed by Italy's Fascist government.

== Bibliography ==
- Moliterno, Gino. Historical Dictionary of Italian Cinema. Scarecrow Press, 2009.
