= Assunta Spina =

Assunta Spina may refer to:

- Assunta Spina (novel), an Italian novel by Salvatore Di Giacomo
- Assunta Spina (play), a 1910 Italian two-act stageplay by Salvatore Di Giacomo
- Assunta Spina (1915 film), a 1915 silent Italian film starring Francesca Bertini
- Assunta Spina (1930 film), a 1930 silent Italian film starring Rina De Liguoro
- Assunta Spina (1948 film), a 1948 Italian film directed by Mario Mattoli
- Assunta Spina (1997 film), a 1997 Italian film directed by Gigi Savoia
