= Cleveland Orchestra Youth Orchestra =

The Cleveland Orchestra Youth Orchestra
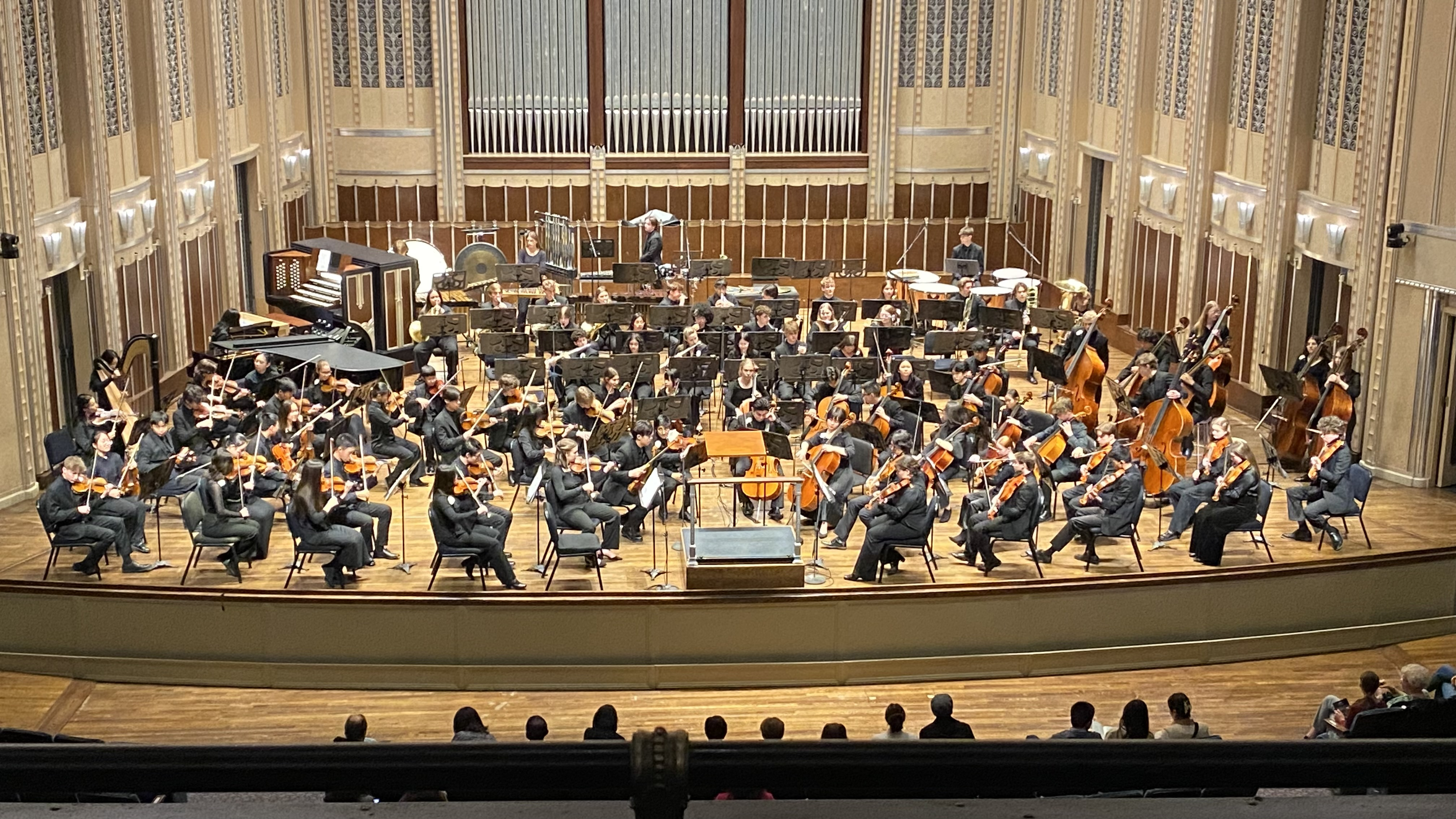
- The orchestra performing at Severance Hall

Background information
- Also known as: COYO
- Origin: Cleveland, Ohio
- Genre: Classical
- Occupation: Symphony orchestra
- Years active: 1986–present
- Members: Principal Conductor and Musical Advisor; James Feddeck; Youth Orchestra Manager; Kennedy McKain; Director of Instrumental Pathways Program; Lauren Generette
- Past members: Founder; Jahja Ling
- Website: www.clevelandorchestrayouthorchestra.com

The Cleveland Orchestra Youth Orchestra (COYO) is a group of 100 young musicians, selected from over 45 cities across Ohio and Pennsylvania.

== Activities ==
The members rehearse weekly at Severance Hall and are regularly coached by members of the Cleveland Orchestra. The orchestra's music director is currently Daniel Reith, assistant conductor of the Cleveland Orchestra. COYO also has the opportunity to work with many of the famous guest conductors that visit to work with the Cleveland Orchestra.

COYO performs three subscription concerts per season at Severance Hall. Additionally, they perform at least three "outreach concerts", performances in the greater Cleveland area. One of COYO's subscription performances includes a performance with the Cleveland Orchestra Youth Chorus.

== History ==
=== Directors ===
COYO is in its 39th season (2025–2026) since it began in 1986 under the direction of music director Jahja Ling.

Years	Music director
1986–1992	Jahja Ling (founder)
1992–1997	Gareth Morrell
1997–1998	Harry Davidson
1998–2003	Steven Smith
2003–2006	James Gaffigan
2006–2009	Jayce Ogren
2009–2013	James Feddeck
2013–2017	Brett Mitchell
2017–2022	Vinay Parameswaran
2022–2025	Daniel Reith
2025–	James Feddeck

=== National Youth Orchestra Festival ===
In 1998, COYO participated in the second National Youth Orchestra Festival sponsored by the American Symphony Orchestra League. COYO was one of five youth orchestras that were selected to participate out of a pool of orchestras across the nation.

== Past concerts ==
COYO is in its 39th season. It typically performs three subscription concerts each season. Subscription concerts are usually held at Severance Hall. COYO also plays community outreach concerts, in which the group travels to a nearby venue to perform. Many of these outreach concerts are held at schools and universities. Additionally, COYO performs at the annual MLK Community Open House at Severance Hall. The Open House is a day of concerts in remembrance of Martin Luther King Jr.

=== Premieres ===
COYO has had the opportunity to host world premieres of several modern works throughout the years and has commissioned pieces, as well. The orchestra has performed the world premiere of 15 pieces, the most recent or which, was commissioned by Roger Briggs'. His composition, Fountain of Youth, was premiered on November 18, 2016.

=== Repertoire ===
COYO typically performs classical works. In the past, the group has performed pieces by Stravinsky, Beethoven, Brahms, Schubert, Tchaikovsky, Dvořák, Shostakovich, Sibelius, Wagner, Mozart, and many others.

Recent concerts have included works by Sarah Kirkland Snider, Lili Boulanger, María Huld Markan Sigfúsdóttir and more.

== Orchestration ==
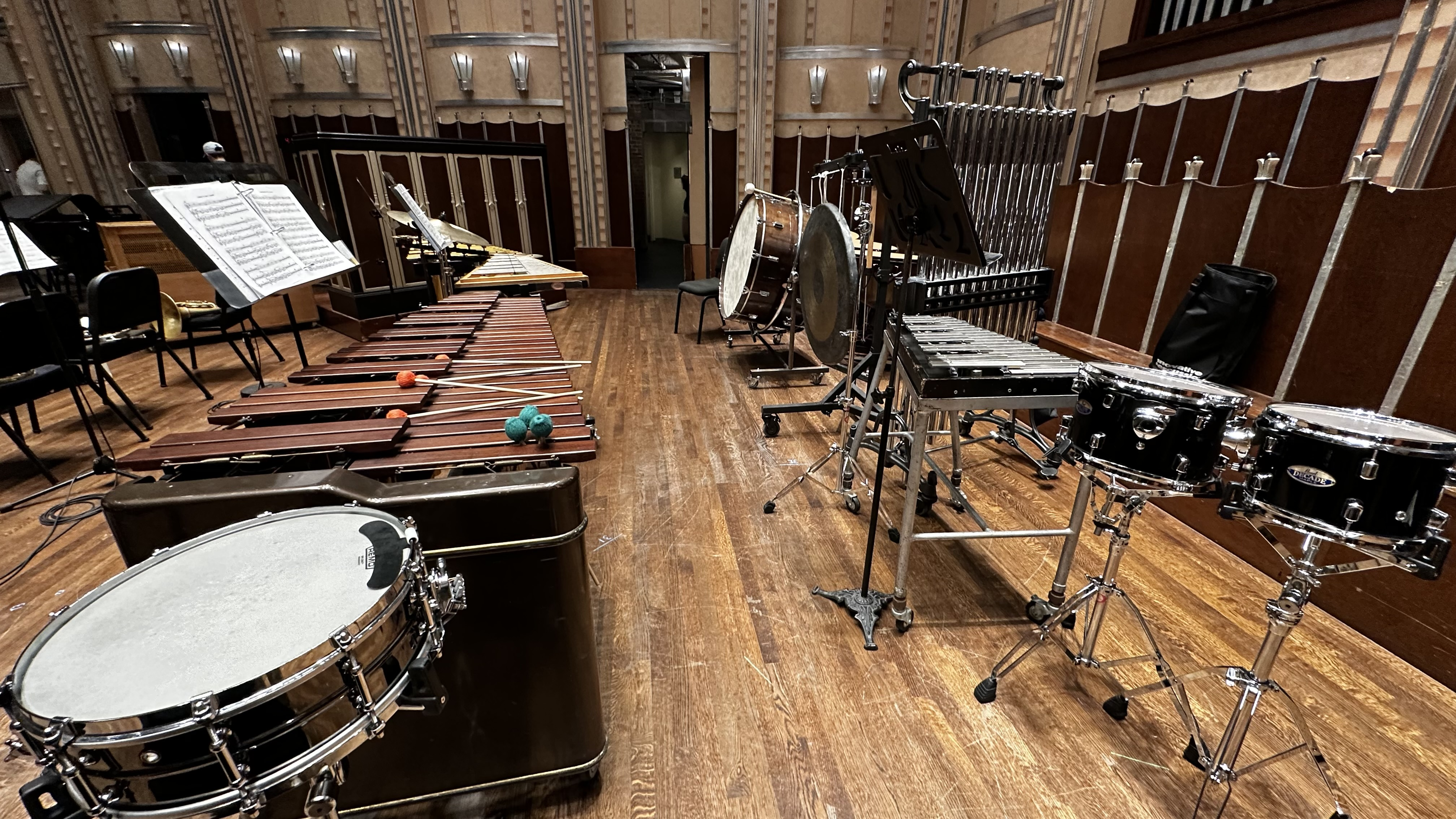
COYO percussion for Sarah Kirkland Snider

COYO is a full symphonic orchestra ensemble. The group typically consists of violins, violas, cellos, string bass, flutes, oboes, clarinets, bassoons, French horns, trumpets, trombones, tuba, timpani and percussion. Auxiliary instruments are used according to the instrumentation of the concert repertoire. Common auxiliary instruments are harp, piccolo, E-flat clarinet and bass clarinet, English horn, and organ.

== Tours ==
COYO has participated in tours, extending their outreach from the greater Cleveland area to the world. Past tours have included:

- 2009 Massachusetts tour to Worcester, Boston, Cambridge and Lexington
- 2001 tour included performances in Carnegie Hall and in Eisenhower Auditorium, Penn State University

COYO performed in Vienna, Prague, and Salzburg in June 2012.

In June 2015, COYO performed in its first tour of China, making its first appearance in Asia; they played in major concert halls Beijing, Tianjin, Shanghai, and Ningbo.

In June 2019, COYO performed in Sankt Florian, Vienna, Bratislava and Budapest.

For the 2024 Summer, COYO and TSYO travelled to each other's cities to rehearse and perform pieces.

== Auditions ==
Auditions take place annually for each season. Auditions are open to all middle-high school students who study privately. COYO auditions are live and typically take place at Severance Hall/Reinberger Chamber Hall.

=== Coachings ===
Members of COYO have the unique opportunity to study with members of The Cleveland Orchestra. Coachings take place during one of the orchestra's rehearsals. Coaching groups are usually divided by Woodwinds, Brass, percussion, and, separately, Strings. Additional coachings are sometimes scheduled for smaller groups (i.e. specifically Cellos, Trumpets, Flutes, etc.).

== See also ==
- Cleveland Youth Wind Symphony
- Contemporary Youth Orchestra
