= Vera Vergani =

Italian actress

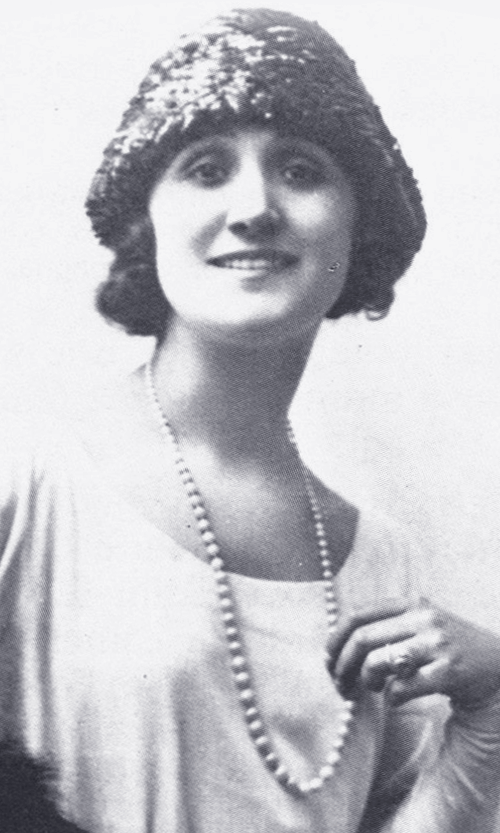
- Born: 6 February 1894; Milan, Lombardy, Italy
- Died: 22 September 1989 (aged 95); Procida, Campania, Italy
- Occupation: Actress
- Years active: 1916–1965 (film)

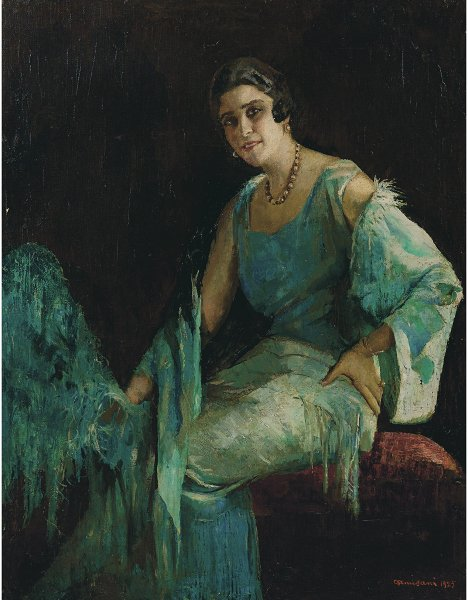
Portrait of Vergani by Giuseppe Amisani.

Vera Vergani (1894–1989) was an Italian stage actress. She also starred in a number of silent films. She was the mother of the film producer Leo Pescarolo.

She played the title role in the 1927 Milan stage production of Salvatore Di Giacomo's Assunta Spina at the Teatro Manzoni.

== Selected filmography ==
- The Fear of Love (1920)
- Caterina (1921)
- The Dreamer (1965)

== Bibliography ==
- Goble, Alan. The Complete Index to Literary Sources in Film. Walter de Gruyter, 1999.
