= Contemporary Youth Orchestra =

Youth orchestra in Ohio, United States

- Youth orchestra
- Short name: CYO
- Location: Cleveland, Ohio
- Concert hall: Maltz Performing Arts Center
- Music director: Kris Morron

Contemporary Youth Orchestra (CYO) is the only youth orchestra in the United States dedicated to the study and performance of contemporary orchestral literature. The orchestra was founded by Liza Grossman in 1995. The orchestra is in residence at Case Western Reserve University in Cleveland, Ohio, United States.

== Music ==
Contemporary Youth Orchestra is a full orchestra that rehearses weekly at Case Western Reserve University. CYO's regular season consists of 3-4 concerts each year, highlighted by collaborations with internationally recognized performers and composers.

== Rock the Orchestra ==
The orchestra's annual series 'Rock the Orchestra' features a different performer or band every year.

Year	Guest Artist	Show Title
2003	Graham Nash	Classical Nash
2004	Jon Anderson	Symphonic Song Cycle
2005	Pat Benatar	Fire Away
2006	Styx	One With Everything
2007	Various	Kashmir
2008	Various	Farandole
2009	Donnie Iris & The Cruisers	Rock Fantastique
2010	Jon Anderson	State of Independence
2011	Jefferson Starship	Jefferson Starship & CYO
2012	Blame Sally	Pass The Buddha
2013	Bootsy Collins	PsychoticBumpSchool
2014	Ben Folds	Ben Folds & CYO
2015	Graham Nash	GNASH
2016	Tommy Shaw	Sing for the Day!
2017	Melissa Etheridge	Pulse
2018	Kenny Loggins	Kenny Loggins & CYO
2019	Jason Mraz	Everything is Sound
2020	Michael Stanley	Another New Years Eve
2021	Chris Thile	Chris Thile & CYO
2022	Luca Mundaca	Drops of Color
2022	Night Ranger	40 Years and a Night with CYO
2023	Dana Hall, Chris Coles	When Still
2024	Chayla Hope	Chayla Hope x CYO's Lo-Fi Mixtape

== See also ==
- Cleveland Orchestra Youth Orchestra
- Cleveland Youth Wind Symphony
