= Ellie Caulkins Opera House =

Coordinates: 39°44′41″N 104°59′54″W

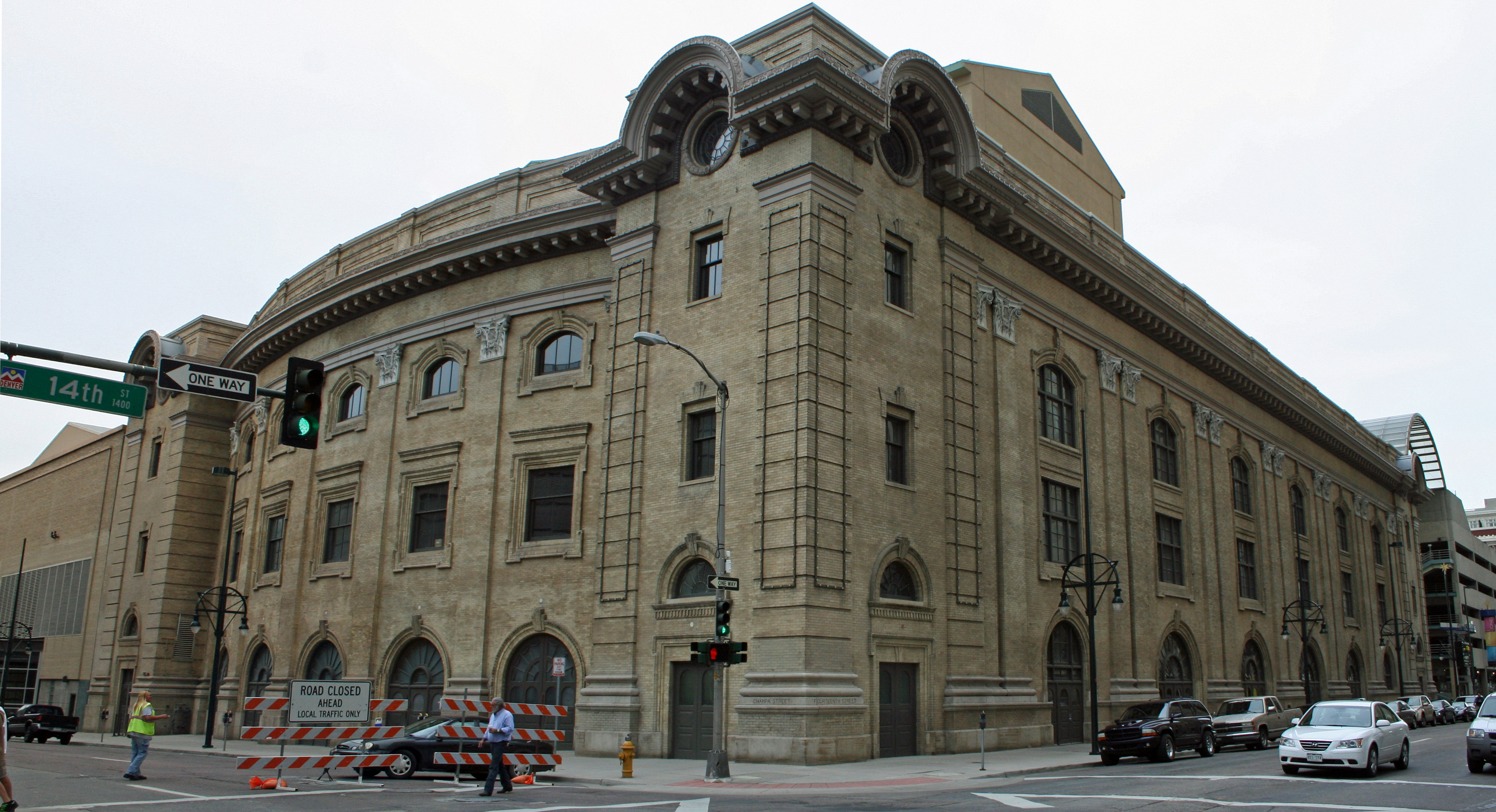
- Interactive map of Ellie Caulkins Opera House
- Former names: Auditorium Theater (1956-2002); Quigg Newton Municipal Auditorium (2002-05)
- Address: 1385 Curtis St; Denver, CO 80204-2110
- Location: Denver Performing Arts Complex
- Owner: Denver Arts & Venues
- Capacity: 2,225 Inner Venues: Chambers Grant Salon: 400; The Studio Loft: 500
- Public transit: Theatre District–Convention Center station

Construction
- Opened: September 1956
- Renovated: 1991-92; 2003-05

Tenant
- Opera Colorado
- Building details

General information
- Renovated: Spring 2003-Fall 2005
- Renovation cost: $97 million ($170 million in 2025 dollars)

Renovating team
- Architect: Semple Brown Design
- Other designers: Lund Partnership; B-K Lighting
- Main contractor: PCL Construction

The Ellie Caulkins Opera House is located in Denver, Colorado as part of the large Denver Performing Arts Complex. It seats 2,225. The Caulkins family pledged $7 million towards the enhancement of the lyric opera house and adjacent public spaces which were constructed inside of the Newton Auditorium.

== History of the theatre ==
The Municipal Auditorium, the largest in America except for Madison Square Garden in New York, was completed in time to host the Democratic National Convention in 1908. Mayor Robert W. Speer and the Chamber of Commerce raised $100,000 to celebrate the July 7 grand opening of the Auditorium with Denver's first national political convention, when William Jennings Bryan was nominated to run for President for the third time.

Originally, the building was a multi-purpose structure: it accommodated concerts, operas, theatrical shows, conventions, basketball, auto shows and even circuses, with flags flying from its domes and light bulbs outlining its pediments, cornice, and corners. The proscenium of the original building was designed to be portable so as to create different-sized spaces for different events. When the proscenium was in place, the building was a 3,326-seat theatre with an extraordinarily large backstage area. When the proscenium was raised, increasing the seating capacity to 12,000, the stage and backstage area became large enough to hold circuses and rodeos.

For several years in the 1920s and 1930s, Music Week was an annual event in Denver. Various communities of the state presented musical programs and most of the performances were in the Auditorium. An opera or operetta was commonly included in the offerings.

In 1921, a company of Denver musicians performed Flotow's Martha in May; of special historical significance was that the two performances were broadcast by radio station 9ZAF, the first time ever that a full-length opera was broadcast.

The Auditorium became the de facto opera house for Denver, and the most enduring. For more than 75 years, until the 1980s and 1990s when other halls opened in an adjoining complex, the Auditorium hosted almost all visiting opera companies and opera concerts, as well as local opera productions.

In 1955 the Auditorium was closed and renovation was begun to make the grand old house a modern theatre. In September 1956, the project was completed and the seating capacity was decreased to 2,240.

In the 1980s other theaters were constructed next to the Auditorium, including Boettcher Concert Hall, Bonfils Theatre Complex and the Denver Center Theatre, to which the Seawell Ballroom was added in the 1990s (these now make up the Denver Performing Arts Complex). The Auditorium arena received another makeover in the early 1990s when the Temple Hoyne Buell Theater was built into it. This theater was a reincarnation of the Municipal Auditorium's old theater and basketball and wrestling arena.

In 1992, after the construction of the Buell Theatre, the facade of the Municipal Auditorium was renovated and the seating capacity became 2,065. The Auditorium was renamed Quigg Newton Denver Municipal Auditorium in 2002.

== Renovations ==
In need of major work, the Newton Auditorium underwent a renovation funded primarily through seat tax revenues collected at city-owned facilities and the proceeds of a bond issue approved by Denver voters in 2002.

In all, the city spent $75 million, while private donors provided $17 million more. The gift from the Caulkins family was used to fund additional enhancements to the lyric opera house and adjacent public spaces inside the Newton Auditorium.

The “Ellie” opened as Opera Colorado's new home on September 10, 2005 with a gala benefit for the Colorado Opera Foundation and featured some major singers from the world of opera. Opera Colorado's first season in the new opera house opened on November 3, 2005 with a production of Carmen starring internationally known mezzo-soprano Denyce Graves in the title role.

The historic shell of the old Auditorium Theatre was rebuilt and named the Ellie Caulkins Opera House, honoring "Denver's First Lady of Opera".

The architect of record, Semple Brown Design, created the performance space, described as "three tiers of balconies curve like lyres; uninterrupted sight lines from every seat focus viewers onto a deep, wide stage.... Sleek staircases and flying bridges pull patrons into the hall. Ellie Caulkins herself is quoted as saying "They say it was like building a ship in a bottle".
