= Orchestra i Pomeriggi Musicali =

Italian orchestra

- Orchestra
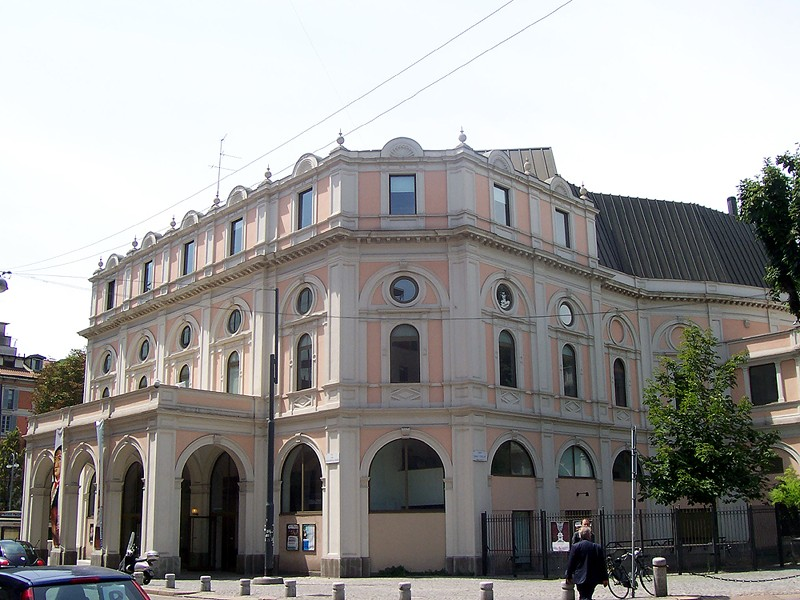
- The Teatro Dal Verme Concert Hall
- Founded: 1945; 80 years ago
- Location: Milan, Italy
- Concert hall: Teatro Dal Verme
- Principal conductor: James Feddeck
- Website: ipomeriggi.it/index.php

The Orchestra i Pomeriggi Musicali (literally, the Musical Afternoon Orchestra) is an Italian orchestra resident in Milan, at the Teatro Dal Verme. It was founded in the period immediately after the Second World War by the theatre promoter Remigio Paone and the music critic Fredinando Ballo, and its debut performance was on 27 November at the Teatro Nuovo di Milano. In its early days it made a substantial contribution to popularising works by 20th century composers who had been banned under the Italian fascist regime, including Stravinsky, Hindemith, Webern, Berg, Poulenc, Honegger and Copland.

Composers such as Honegger and Hindemith have conducted the orchestra as guests, as have some of the most famous conductors of the later 20th century, such as Claudio Abbado, Leonard Bernstein, Pierre Boulez and Carlo Maria Giulini. The orchestra performs primarily in Milan and other cities in Lombardy, though it has also toured more widely. It has made a wide variety of recordings, many of them of works by Italian composers of a wide range of periods.

The orchestra is governed through a foundation of the same name, which has representation of the Lombardy Region and the city and province of Milan as well as private bodies.

== Sources ==
Programme notes from a concert in the Festival di Bellagio e del Lago di Como, 26 July 2014
