= Brett Mitchell =

American conductor, composer, and pianist (born 1979)

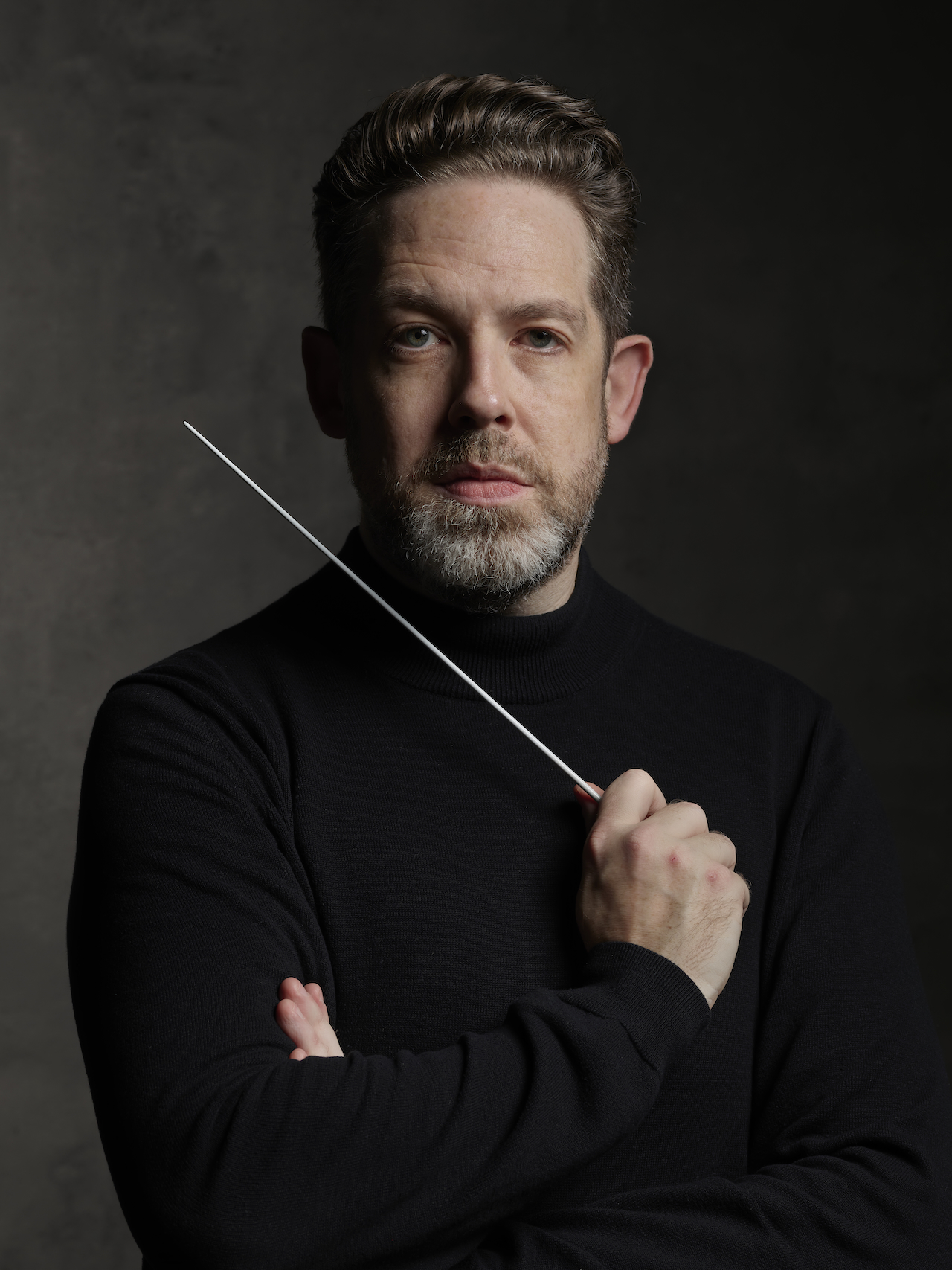
- Mitchell in 2023
- Born: Brett William Mitchell; July 2, 1979 (age 47); Seattle, Washington, U.S.
- Education: Western Washington University (BM); University of Texas at Austin (MM, DMA)
- Occupations: conductor; composer; pianist
- Years active: 1995–present
- Organizations: Pasadena Symphony; Sunriver Music Festival
- Spouse: Angela Mitchell (m. 2014)
- Children: 2
- Website: brettmitchellconductor.com

Brett Mitchell (born July 2, 1979) is an American conductor, composer, and pianist. He is currently Music Director of the Pasadena Symphony and Artistic Director & Conductor of the Sunriver Music Festival.

== Early life and education ==
=== 1979–1997: Early life and musical beginnings ===
Born and raised in Seattle, Washington, Mitchell began piano studies at age six, and studied piano, percussion, and saxophone throughout elementary, middle, and high school. He gave his first public performances as a conductor while at Lynnwood High School in 1995 at the age of 16.

=== 1997–2005: College years ===
==== Western Washington University ====
Mitchell began undergraduate work on a degree in music composition at Western Washington University in 1997. During his four years there, he studied composition and conducting with Roger Briggs and piano with Margaret Brink and Jeffrey Gilliam. He was chosen as the university's Young Alumnus of the Year in 2014.

==== The University of Texas at Austin ====
Upon completion of his Bachelor of Music in June 2001, he moved to Austin, Texas, to study orchestral conducting with Kevin Noe at the University of Texas at Austin. For the next four years, he would serve as Music Director of the University Orchestra and sometime cover conductor for the Austin Symphony Orchestra. Mitchell graduated from the University of Texas with a Master of Music in 2003 and a Doctor of Musical Arts in 2005. His work with Noe led to his employment with the Pittsburgh New Music Ensemble from 2002 to 2006 as their Associate Conductor, where his responsibilities included leading subscription programs, many world and U.S. premieres, numerous multi-media productions, and several recording projects.

==== Continued studies ====
In addition to his graduate work, Mitchell also studied with conductors outside the university, most notably Kurt Masur, with whom he began studies at the Manhattan School of Music in 2004. In early 2008, Masur selected Mitchell to receive the inaugural Felix Mendelssohn Bartholdy Scholarship award, entailing intensive, one-on-one study with Masur, and assisting him with concerts in Europe and America. Mitchell was also invited to conduct the National Symphony Orchestra and to study with Leonard Slatkin as part of the 2005 National Conducting Institute, and was invited by Slatkin to work with the NSO again in 2006. He studied with Lorin Maazel at the Castleton Festival, David Robertson, Gerard Schwarz, Gunther Schuller, Marin Alsop, Jorma Panula, and Larry Rachleff. Mitchell was the youngest of ten semifinalists from a pool of over 500 applicants in the Third Sir Georg Solti International Conductors' Competition in 2006.

== Career ==
=== 2005–2013: Rise to recognition ===
==== Northern Illinois University ====
After completing his training, Mitchell accepted a position as Director of Orchestras, Music Director of the opera program, and Professor of Conducting at Northern Illinois University from 2005 to 2007. He led the Philharmonic in six concerts each year, and led his first two opera productions during his tenure: Igor Stravinsky's The Rake's Progress and Mark Adamo's Little Women. The Philharmonic was also invited to perform at the Illinois Music Educators Association's All-State Conference for the first time in over a decade in January 2007. His tenure there saw the Philharmonic's first performance of a Gustav Mahler symphony in a dozen years (Symphony No. 1 in April 2006) and their return to the recording studio, recording Sergei Rachmaninoff's Piano Concerto No. 2 in May 2007. Mitchell ended his time at NIU with a week-long festival devoted to the music of Kevin Puts.

==== Orchestre National de France ====
While teaching at NIU, Mitchell was invited by his mentor Kurt Masur to audition to become Assistant Conductor of the Orchestre National de France. In February 2006, Mitchell successfully auditioned and was named to the post. During his three-year tenure, he conducted the orchestra and assisted Masur and guest conductors such as Seiji Ozawa and Daniele Gatti at the Théâtre des Champs-Élysées and on tour.

==== Houston Symphony ====
In February 2007, Mitchell was appointed American Conducting Fellow of the Houston Symphony by Hans Graf. In that role, he led the orchestra in several dozen concerts—including on all subscription series—in Jones Hall and throughout the greater Houston area each season. His title was augmented to Assistant Conductor/American Conducting Fellow in June 2008; prior to his final season with the orchestra (2010–2011), his title was modified again to Assistant Conductor, reflecting the end of his fellowship with the League of American Orchestras. During his four-year tenure with the Houston Symphony (which ended in May 2011), he led the orchestra in over one hundred performances, several of which were broadcast nationwide on SymphonyCast and Performance Today. Since that time, Mitchell has returned frequently to the Houston Symphony as a guest conductor.

==== Saginaw Bay Symphony Orchestra ====
In May 2010, after a two-year search including more than 150 candidates from around the world, Mitchell was appointed the ninth music director of Michigan's Saginaw Bay Symphony Orchestra. He took the helm of the orchestra at the outset of its 75th-anniversary season in September 2010, and led the orchestra in its complete series of classical, pops, and education concerts throughout his initial three-year contract and the extension that followed. Mitchell ultimately served as music director of the SBSO for five seasons, resigning at the end of 2014-15 season due to increased obligations with the Cleveland Orchestra and various guest conducting responsibilities.

==== University of Houston ====
Mitchell began working with the Moores Opera Center at the Moores School of Music of the University of Houston in April 2010 as a guest conductor, and eventually accepted a post as Music Director of the program during the 2012-13 season. Over the course of his three seasons, he led eight productions spanning core repertory works of Mozart and Verdi to contemporary works by Robert Aldridge (composer), Daniel Catán, and Daron Hagen.

=== 2013–2021: Career expansion ===
==== The Cleveland Orchestra ====
In January 2013, Mitchell was invited by Franz Welser-Möst to become Assistant Conductor of the Cleveland Orchestra, a position he assumed at the beginning of the 2013-14 season. At the conclusion of his initial two-year term, he was promoted to Associate Conductor—a title held by only four previous conductors in the Orchestra's 98-year history and not since Jahja Ling in the 1984-85 season—and his contract was extended for an additional two years through the 2016-17 season. Mitchell has returned frequently to the orchestra as a guest conductor since his tenure, leading his 150th performance with the ensemble in December 2023.

Through his tenure with the Cleveland Orchestra, he concurrently served as music director of the Cleveland Orchestra Youth Orchestra, increasing the group's commitment to contemporary repertoire and leading them on a four-city tour of China in June 2015. Mitchell concluded his tenure with both organizations in September 2017.

While in Cleveland, Mitchell also worked frequently with the young musicians at the Cleveland Institute of Music, leading three orchestral performances during their 2016-17 and 2017-18 concert seasons on the CIM campus and at Severance Hall.

In September 2016, during his final season in Cleveland, Mitchell signed with manager Linda Marder of CM Artists New York to provide worldwide representation.

==== Colorado Symphony ====
After making a highly successful debut with the Colorado Symphony in July 2016, Mitchell was named the orchestra's next music director in September 2016. Mitchell held the title of Music Director Designate during the 2016-17 season, and began his four-season tenure as Music Director with the 2017-18 season. During his first several seasons as Music Director, Mitchell collaborated with such celebrated soloists as Yo-Yo Ma, Renée Fleming, Itzhak Perlman, Bela Fleck, and Leslie Odom Jr. After the 2019-20 and 2020-21 seasons were curtailed by the COVID-19 pandemic, Mitchell stepped down from the orchestra after five seasons at the helm in June 2021.

While in Denver, Mitchell also regularly worked with the students at the Lamont School of Music at the University of Denver, leading three performances with the Lamont Symphony Orchestra during the 2019-20 and 2022-23 concert seasons.

=== 2022–present: Pasadena Symphony and Sunriver Music Festival ===
==== Sunriver Music Festival ====
In September 2021, after leading several subscription programs on their 2021 summer season, Mitchell was named Artistic Director & Conductor of the Sunriver Music Festival in Bend, Oregon. Mitchell began an initial three-year term in 2022, and extended his contract in 2024 for an additional four years through the 2028 season.

==== Pasadena Symphony ====
Mitchell first led the Pasadena Symphony as a guest conductor in March 2022, and returned to lead the ensemble again in October 2023. Following those performances, Mitchell was named the orchestra's music director in March 2024, becoming just the sixth artistic leader since the orchestra was founded in 1928. His five-year tenure began with the 2024-25 season and runs through the orchestra's centennial in 2028-29.

==== Guest conducting ====
In May 2025, with less than 24 hours’ notice, Mr. Mitchell stepped in for his subscription debut with the New York Philharmonic, leading three performances of Kevin Puts’s The Brightness of Light featuring soprano Renée Fleming and baritone Rod Gilfry, followed by the complete score of Maurice Ravel’s Daphnis et Chloé featuring the New York Philharmonic Chorus.

In recent seasons, Mitchell has also guest conducted the Cleveland Orchestra, Dallas Symphony Orchestra, Detroit Symphony Orchestra, Edmonton Symphony Orchestra, Fort Worth Symphony Orchestra,Houston Symphony, Indianapolis Symphony Orchestra, Los Angeles Philharmonic, Milwaukee Symphony Orchestra, Minnesota Orchestra, National Symphony Orchestra, New Zealand Symphony Orchestra, North Carolina Symphony, Oregon Symphony, Rochester Philharmonic Orchestra, ROCO, Saint Paul Chamber Orchestra, San Antonio Symphony, San Francisco Symphony, Tulsa Symphony, and Vancouver Symphony Orchestra. Recent summer festival appearances include the Grant Park Music Festival, National Repertory Orchestra, Strings Music Festival, Sarasota Music Festival, Texas Music Festival, and Interlochen Center for the Arts. Mitchell regularly collaborates with the world's leading soloists, including Rudolf Buchbinder, Kirill Gerstein, James Ehnes, Augustin Hadelich, Leila Josefowicz, and Alisa Weilerstein.

Mitchell made his European debut in 2004 in a series of three concerts with Romania's Brașov Philharmonic (to which he returned in February 2009), and made his Latin American debut in 2005 with the OFUNAM in Mexico City as part of the Eduardo Mata Conducting Competition.

==== Pianist ====
In June 2020, at the height of the COVID-19 pandemic, Mitchell began recording videos at the piano from his home and releasing them via his YouTube channel. He has since released hundreds of videos, with a particular focus on original arrangements of film music, many presented in synchronization with the original, corresponding clips. Mitchell has also used this outlet to present his own works as a composer, including several pieces written for his children upon their births in 2021 and 2024.

In November 2025, in recognition of his "distinguished career in music and outstanding commitment and loyalty to the Steinway piano," Mitchell was named a Steinway Artist by Steinway & Sons.

== Personal life ==
Mitchell resides in Denver with his wife, soprano Angela Mitchell, and their two small children.
