= Peter Oundjian =

Canadian violinist and conductor (born 1955)

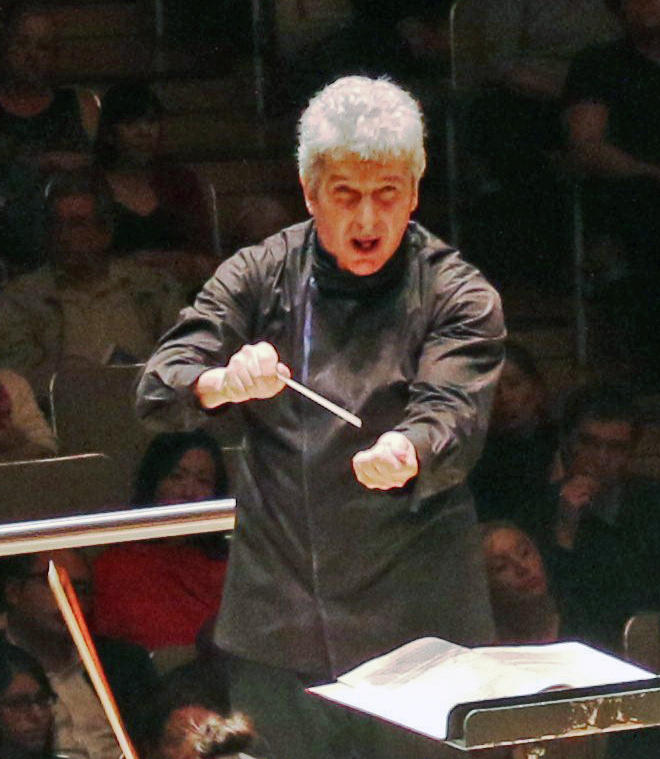
- Oundjian conducts the Toronto Symphony Orchestra at Roy Thomson Hall in June 2014
- Born: Peter Haig Oundjian; December 21, 1955 (age 70); Toronto, Ontario, Canada
- Citizenship: Canada; United Kingdom; United States
- Education: Royal College of Music; Juilliard School
- Occupation: Conductor
- Spouse: Nadine Aubort
- Children: 2
- Parent(s): Haig Aram Oundjian, Joan Bertrand (Sanderson) Oundjian
- Relatives: Eric Idle (cousin)

Peter Haig Oundjian (born December 21, 1955) is a Canadian violinist and conductor.

== Early life ==
Peter Oundjian was born in Toronto, Ontario, the fifth of five children of Haig Aram Oundjian and his wife Joan Bertrand (Sanderson) Oundjian. His father was of Armenian and British descent, his mother was British. Oundjian also claims Scottish ancestry through his maternal grandfather, a Sanderson, and the MacDonell of Glengarry clan. Oundjian was educated in England, where he began studying the violin at age seven with Manoug Parikian. He attended Charterhouse School in Godalming and continued his studies later with Bela Katona. He then attended the Royal College of Music.

Oundjian subsequently studied at the Juilliard School with Ivan Galamian, Itzhak Perlman, and Dorothy DeLay. While at Juilliard, he minored in conducting, and later received encouragement in his endeavors when he attended a master class from the eminent Austrian conductor Herbert von Karajan.

== Career ==
In 1980, Oundjian won First Prize at the International Violin Competition in Viña del Mar, Chile. Oundjian became the first violinist of the Tokyo String Quartet and held the post for 14 years. A repetitive stress injury forced Oundjian to curtail his instrumental career. He then shifted his full-time musical focus to conducting. Since 1981, Oundjian has taught as an adjunct professor of violin at the Yale School of Music.

Oundjian was the Artistic Director of the Nieuw Sinfonietta Amsterdam (now the Amsterdam Sinfonietta) from 1998 to 2003. He is also the Artistic Advisor and Principal Guest Conductor of the Caramoor International Music Festival. He was also the Principal Guest Conductor of the Colorado Symphony Orchestra for three years. For four summers, he led The Philadelphia Orchestra's "Absolutely Mozart" Festival. Oundjian became principal guest conductor and artistic advisor of the Detroit Symphony Orchestra in September 2006.

Oundjian was named music director of the Toronto Symphony Orchestra (TSO) in January 2003, and assumed the post in 2004. The orchestra had financial problems before the time of Oundjian's appointment, and he contributed to an improvement in the orchestra's situation since the start of his tenure. The 2005 documentary film Five Days in September: The Rebirth of an Orchestra records the first days of Oundjian's first season as the TSO's music director. In February 2007, Oundjian extended his contract with the TSO to 2012. Following a subsequent contract extension through the 2013–2014 season, in April 2013, the TSO further extended his contract through the 2016–2017 season. Following a further TSO contract extension through the 2017–2018 season, Oundjian concluded his music directorship of the TSO at the close of the 2017–2018 season and was named the TSO's conductor emeritus. He also received the Key to the City from Toronto mayor John Tory.

In January 2011, the Royal Scottish National Orchestra announced the appointment of Oundjian as its next music director, as of the 2012–2013 season, with an initial contract of 4 years. He concluded his RSNO tenure at the close of the 2017–2018 season.

In January 2019, the Colorado Music Festival announced the appointment of Oundjian as its next music director. In February 2022, the Colorado Symphony announced the appointment of Oundjian as its principal conductor. Oundjian had previously served as the Colorado Symphony's principal guest conductor from 2003 to 2006. In September 2024, the Colorado Symphony announced the promotion of Oundjian to the post of its music director, effective with the 2025–2026 season, with an initial contract of four years.

== Personal life ==
Oundjian and his wife Nadine have two children. His nephew is hockey player Ben Smith. He is a cousin to British comedian Eric Idle. In June 2007, Oundjian conducted the world premiere of an oratorio by Idle and John DuPrez based on the Monty Python movie Life of Brian, titled Not the Messiah (He's a Very Naughty Boy), at the first Luminato Festival in Toronto, Canada.

Cultural offices
Preceded by Lev Markiz	Artistic Director, Nieuw Sinfonietta Amsterdam; 1998–2003	Succeeded by Candida Thompson
Preceded by Jean-Marie Zeitouni	Music Director, Colorado Music Festival; 2019–present	Succeeded by incumbent
Preceded by Brett Mitchell	Music Director, Colorado Symphony; 2025–present	Succeeded by incumbent
