= Assunta Spina (1930 film) =

1930 film

- Directed by: Roberto Roberti
- Written by: Gaetano Campanile-Mancini
- Based on: Assunta Spina by Salvatore Di Giacomo
- Starring: Rina De Liguoro; Febo Mari
- Cinematography: Luigi Fiorio
- Production company: Caesar Film
- Distributed by: ENAC
- Release date: 12 March 1930
- Country: Italy
- Language: Italian

Assunta Spina is a 1930 Italian silent drama film directed by Roberto Roberti and starring Rina De Liguoro and Febo Mari. It is based on the play of the same title by Salvatore Di Giacomo.

== Plot ==
Assunta, a commoner of Naples, is stabbed by her lover Michele for jealousy.

== Cast ==
- Rina De Liguoro as Assunta Spina
- Febo Mari as Michele Boccadifuoco
- Elio Steiner
- Alfredo Martinelli
- Carlos Montes
- Cellio Bucchi
- Goffredo D'Andrea
