= Teatro Manzoni =

Theatre in Milan

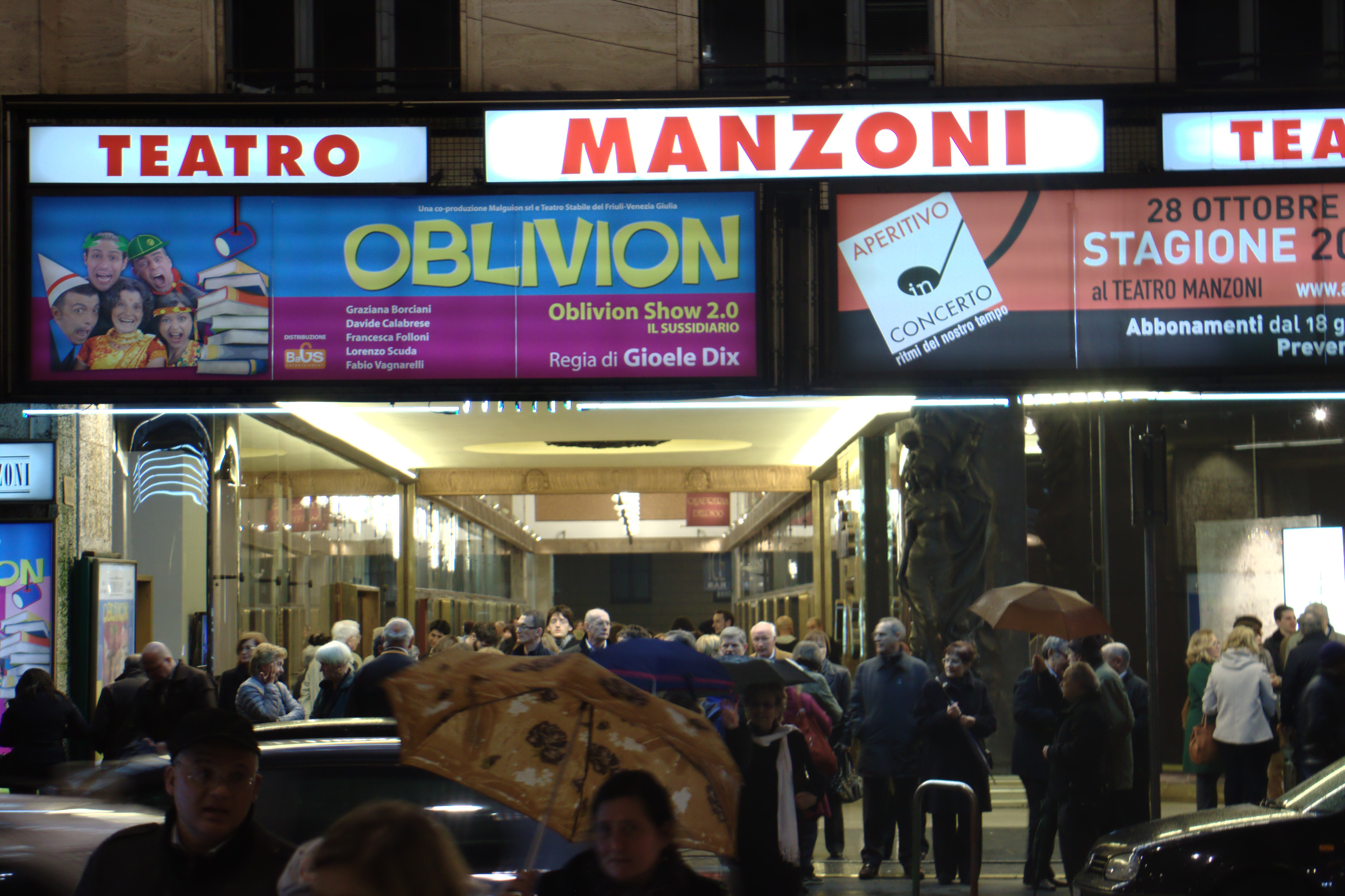
image of the Teatro Manzoni theater

The Teatro Manzoni is a theatre in the northern Italian city of Milan, located on the Via Manzoni.

Opened in 1870 it was originally called the Teatro sociale di Milano, before being renamed after Alessandro Manzoni following his death in 1873. It was originally located on the Piazza San Fedele. A growing reputation led to celebrated actors such as Eleonora Duse and Sarah Bernhardt appearing there. In the twentieth century it remained a key venue until it was destroyed by Allied bombing in August 1943 during the Second World War.

The theatre moved to its current location and was rebuilt to designs by the architect Alziro Bergonzo, opening in 1950. The first manager of the relaunched theatre was the impresario Remigio Paone. In 1978 ownership was acquired by Silvio Berlusconi's Fininvest, with artistic control passing to Luigi Foscale.

== Selected performances ==
- Henry IV (1922) by Luigi Pirandello
- Assunta Spina (1927) by Salvatore Di Giacomo
- The Duchess of Padua (1942) by Oscar Wilde

== Bibliography ==
- Berghaus, Günter. Fascism and Theatre: Comparative Studies on the Aesthetics and Politics of Performance in Europe, 1925-1945. Berghahn Books, 1996.
- Evangelista, Stefano. The Reception of Oscar Wilde in Europe. A&C Black, 2010.
- Lane, David. Berlusconi's Shadow: Crime, Justice and the Pursuit of Power. Allen Lane, 2004.
