= Boettcher Concert Hall =

Concert Hall in Denver, Colorado

- DPAC, Denver Performing Arts Complex
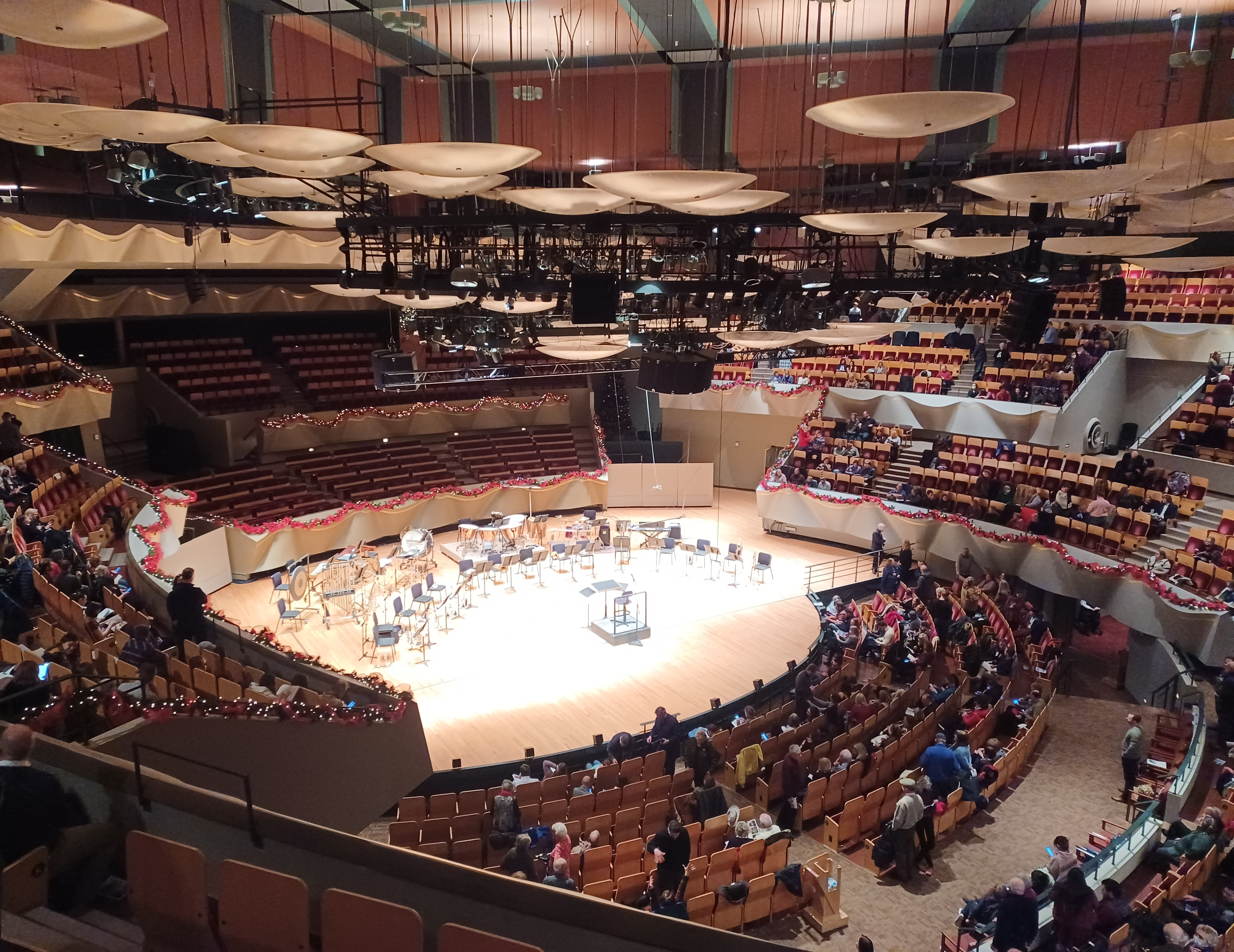
- Auditorium with in the round arrangement
- Interactive map of Boettcher Concert Hall
- Full name: Boettcher Concert Hall at Denver Performing Arts Complex
- Address: 1000 14th St, Denver, CO 80202
- Location: Denver, Colorado, US
- Coordinates: 39°44′38″N 104°59′55″W
- Owner: City and County of Denver
- Operator: Denver Performing Arts Complex
- Capacity: 2679 Orchestra: 823, Parquet: 147, Dress Circles: 254, Mezzanines (8): 1,146 / Rings: 264, Pit Seats: 45
- Type: Performing-arts center Concert Hall
- Field size: Stage: 2,400 square feet
- Public transit: Theatre District–Convention Center station

Construction
- Built: 1978
- Architect: Hardy Holzman Pfeiffer Associates

Tenant
- Colorado Symphony

Website
- www.artscomplex.com/explore-the-complex/theatres-venues/boettcher-concert-hall

Boettcher Concert Hall is a concert hall in Denver, Colorado and is home to the Colorado Symphony. It is named after Colorado native and philanthropist Claude K. Boettcher.

The Colorado Symphony is the primary occupant of the Boettcher Concert Hall. Established in 1989 as the successor to the Denver Symphony Orchestra, the Colorado Symphony rehearses and performs primarily in Boettcher Concert Hall, but also throughout the Front Range. The orchestra draws 150,000 patrons to 90 performances every year to the concert hall. Its current president and CEO is Daniel Wachter, and its current music director is Peter Oundjian.

== History ==
Boettcher was the first symphony hall in the round in the United States. Built in 1978 by Hardy Holzman Pfeiffer Associates, as a home for the Denver Symphony Orchestra, the hall is part of the Denver Performing Arts Complex, which is the second largest performing arts complex in the United States after Lincoln Center in New York City. Boettcher originally opened to mixed reviews. Due to its size in relation to the size of the community it serves, its 2,362 seats are often not completely filled. Tuned acoustically with a full house in mind, Boettcher originally suffered from hot and cold spots when the theater was only partially filled.

=== Potential closure ===
In mid-2014, The Denver Post reported that the city of Denver was considering a plan to demolish Boettcher Concert Hall and build an outdoor amphitheater in its place at the Denver Performing Arts Complex. This was in tandem with a planned temporary move out at the end of the 2014–15 concert season to accommodate $17 million in upgrades of the facility. The city had also considered building a smaller venue owing to the attendance of the hall's primary occupant (Colorado Symphony) routinely filling only about half of the existing capacity. The city explored building a venue with reconfigurable seating, allowing shows with as few as 500 attendees, to better accommodate a wider variety of performances and reach a broader audience. Denver Mayor Michael Hancock appointed a team to begin working on October 1, 2014, on the future of Boettcher Concert Hall. The debate was both about accessibility as well as the cost of making extensive repairs and renovations.

Potential plans included renovating and managing Boettcher as a multi-use facility that could host concerts and provide educational space. Making the space usable as a concert hall at night and a space for small classrooms. There was also discussion of adding an outdoor amphitheater. This option proved controversial, not only due to demolishing the Boettcher but also due to competition with Denver's Red Rocks Amphitheatre. This potential move would have also involved constructing a shared box office for the three large facilities in the complex. The Colorado Symphony Orchestra leadership was quick to present many reasons why it was a valuable tenant in the Boettcher.

== Design ==
The Boettcher Concert Hall is the nation's first symphony hall in-the-round, designed to place the audience close to the stage in a unique environment – 80% of the seats are within 65 feet of the stage, There are no true vertical or horizontal surfaces inside Boettcher Concert Hall; the walls are canted at a slight angle to disperse sound and prevent flutter echoes. On each curved surface of the hall is a wave-like band, approximately four feet high, technically called an undulating acoustical facia. These facias diffuse, reflect and channel sound throughout the venue. The seats in Boettcher are custom-designed, made from steam-bent wood with their backs varying in height from 42 inches to 48 inches. The acoustical moat, located underneath the stage is essential in the surround design, it acts as a reverberate chamber for low frequency sound. The Canopy features 108 circular discs which is the primary device for distribution of sound to the musicians as well as the audience. These discs effect certain lighting positions on the catwalks and ring hangers.

In 1993, the theater underwent a major acoustical renovation. The height of the seat backs was adjusted, additional acoustic reflectors were added, and acoustic curtains were installed which allow the theater to be tuned for specific performances—even during a performance.

== See also ==
- List of concert halls
