= Giuseppe Amisani =

Italian painter (1881–1941)

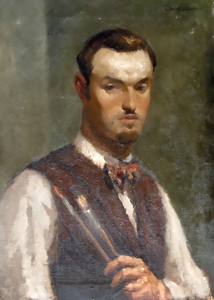
- Giuseppe Amisani, Self Portrait, 1900
- Born: Giuseppe Amisani; 7 December 1881; Mede Lomellina, Lombardy, Italy
- Died: 8 September 1941; Portofino, Liguria, Italy
- Education: Accademia di Brera, Milan
- Awards: Mylius Prize, 1908; Fumagalli Award, 1912

Giuseppe Amisani (7 December 1881 – 8 September 1941) was an Italian portrait painter of the Belle Époque.

== Life ==
Amisani was born on 7 December 1881 in Piazza Mercato (now Piazza Giuseppe Amisani) in the comune of Mede di Lomellina, near Pavia in Lombardy, northern Italy. He studied at the technical institute of Pavia, where he failed the technical drawing course; he then studied at the Accademia di Brera in Milan under Cesare Tallone and Vespasiano Bignami. He won the Mylius prize of the Academy for his painting l'Eroe ("the hero") in 1908, and in 1911 or 1912 won the Fumagalli prize for figure-painting with his portrait of Lyda Borelli. From then on he concentrated almost exclusively on portrait-painting; his landscapes of the Italian Alps, of Rhodes and of Tunisia also attracted interest.

Amisani was internationally famous in his time. He spent several years in Argentina and Brazil, and travelled also to England, France, North Africa and to the United States.

He died in Portofino on 8 September 1941.

== Works ==
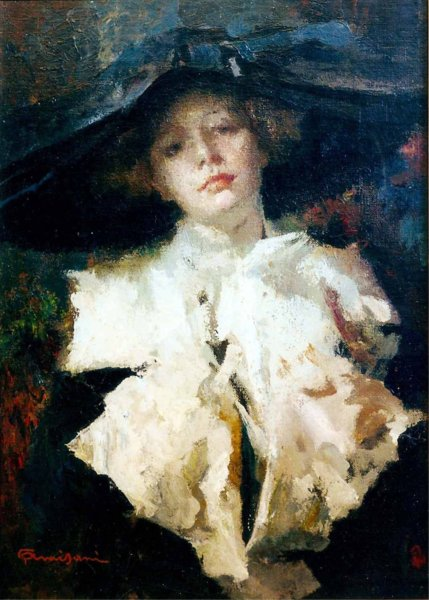
Giuseppe Amisani, Portrait of Lyda Borelli, c. 1910

Many of Amisani's portraits are of women. Among them are La Teletta, in the Galleria d'Arte Moderna of Milan; his Ritratto di Lyda Borelli, in the São Paulo Museum of Art, Brazil; and Signora in grigio, his portrait of the actress Maria Melato, now in the Musei Civici di Monza.

Amisani exhibited at the twelfth Esposizione Internazionale d'Arte della Città di Venezia (later known as the Biennale di Venezia) in 1920.

In 1924, at the peak of his career, he was invited to Egypt to execute decorations at Ras al-Tin, the royal palace of Fuad I of Egypt. While there he painted a portrait of Farouk, then a small child. In 1926 Amisani was commissioned by the publishers of L'Illustrazione Italiana to paint landscapes in Rhodes. In the following year he exhibited North African landscapes in London.

A self-portrait was shown at the seventeenth Esposizione Internazionale d'Arte in Venice in 1930, and later bought by the Galleria degli Uffizi, Florence. Other works are in museums in Bari, Piacenza, and Lima, Peru.

== Reception ==
Amisani was an important figure in his lifetime, though almost entirely forgotten today – his name is not included in the principal works of reference in the twenty-first century. He was a close contemporary of Umberto Boccioni and of Pablo Picasso, but completely ignored currents such as Futurism and Cubism which changed the face of fine art in the twentieth century, preferring to satisfy the tastes of his clients, who were the noble, rich and the famous of his time. His reputation was for elegance and for the fresh colours of his palette. A retrospective exhibition of his work at the Castello Sforzesco of Vigevano in the province of Pavia in 2008 was the first dedicated to him in fifty years.

== Exhibitions ==
Exhibitions of Amisani's work have included:

- Galleria Pesaro, Milan, 1923.
- Egypt, Algiers and portraiture by Giuseppe Amisani, Arlington Gallery, Bond Street, London, 1927.
- XVII Esposizione Internazionale d'Arte, Venice, 1930.
- Giuseppe Amisani, Il pittore dei Re, Castello Sforzesco, Vigevano, Pavia, Italy, 2008.
- Rirì la sciantosa e le altre. Ritratti di donne nella pittura di Giuseppe Amisani (1879–1941), Galleria Civica di Bari, 2012.
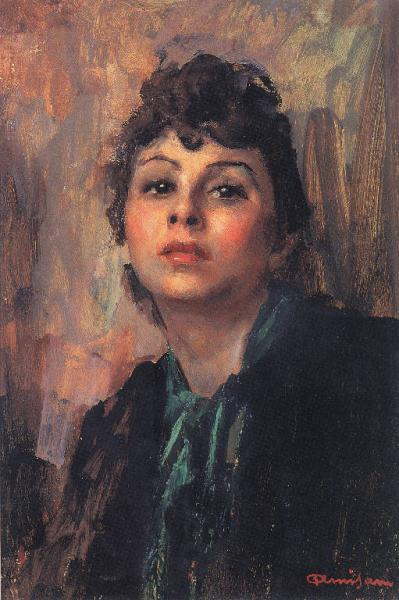
La Modella, circa. 1910

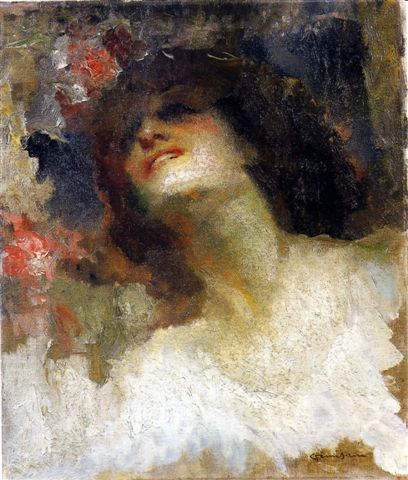
Ritratto di donna

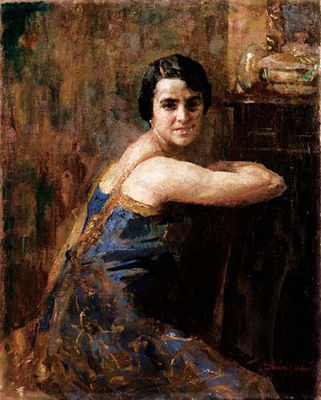

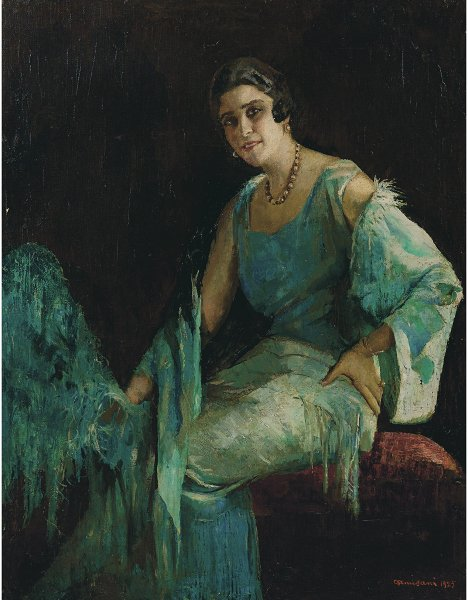
Vera Vergani

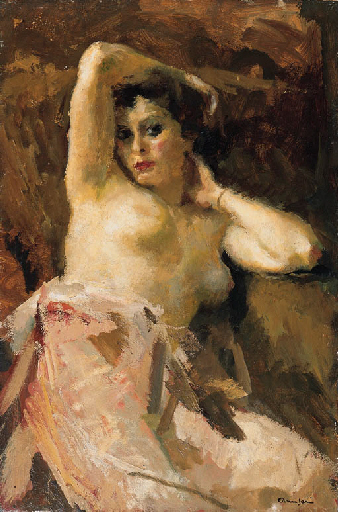

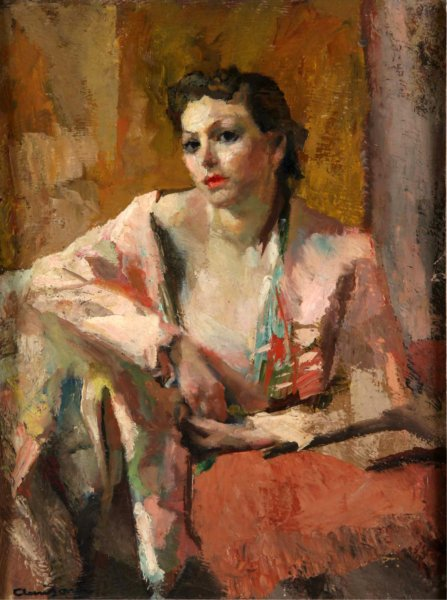
Riri in rosa

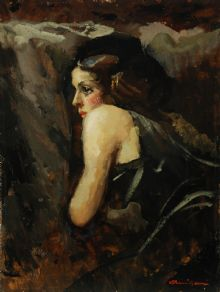

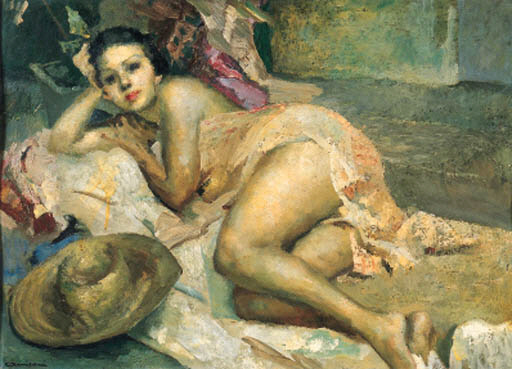
