= Opera Colorado =

Opera company located in Denver, Colorado

Opera Colorado is an opera company located in Denver, Colorado. Founded in 1981, it presents an annual season of three to four fully staged productions. Its primary performance venue is the Ellie Caulkins Opera House.

== History ==
The company was founded in 1981 (with its first performances in 1983) by husband and wife team Nathaniel Merrill and Louise Sherman, who came to Denver from long careers at the Metropolitan Opera in New York City. They had hoped that opera would flourish in Denver, but there was no suitable venue, and performances were given in the in-the-round Boettcher Hall, a part of in the Denver Performing Arts Complex and used primarily as a concert hall. In spite of the location, many international opera stars appeared in Denver. These included Plácido Domingo, Catherine Malfitano, James McCracken, and Pilar Lorengar in the first season. Following seasons have seen Justino Diaz, Eva Marton, Cornell MacNeil, James Morris, Sherrill Milnes, and Samuel Ramey appear in Opera Colorado productions.

James Robinson was appointed artistic director of the company in 2000. Robinson's work has been seen at many opera houses including New York City Opera, Santa Fe Opera, Houston Grand Opera, Los Angeles Opera, and Opera Ireland. Peter Russell joined Opera Colorado in 2001 as the new president and general director after leading the Lindemann Young Artist Program at the Metropolitan Opera and serving as the Director of the Wolf Trap Opera Company. With his appointment, Robinson went about re-configuring the hall to provide a three-quarter thrust stage which also required the use of microphones. As Russell noted: "if you tried to sing in that big cavern of a space without amplification, the voices would simply go nowhere". However, beginning in September 2005, Opera Colorado moved its performances to the new Ellie Caulkins Opera House. The move to a house more suitable for the presentation of opera led to increases in the donor base and subscribers. It also allowed Opera Colorado to work with other companies on co-productions in ways which were not possible before. As Russell noted, the effect of the new opera house "changed the complexion of this opera company in a way that is truly a once-in-a-lifetime experience".

In August 2007, Russell and Robinson announced their resignations from Opera Colorado, and Greg Carpenter was named the new General Director. Prior to joining Opera Colorado, Carpenter worked as the Manager of Development with the National Symphony Orchestra at the John F. Kennedy Center for the Performing Arts in Washington, D.C. During the 2007–2008 season, the company celebrated its 25th anniversary. The season opened in November with a gala celebration featuring a performance by Patti Lupone followed by performances of Verdi's La traviata, Donizetti's Don Pasquale, and a concert performance of Wagner's The Flying Dutchman starring James Morris. The season concluded with Adams' Nixon in China.

In 2009, Opera Colorado was awarded the Downtown Denver Partnership Award, "for 25 years of contributing to the vibrancy and diversity of Downtown Denver's performing arts environment." In the same year, the Bonfils-Stanton Foundation announced that Carpenter would receive a 2009 Livingston Fellowship. The Livingston Fellowships, each providing up to $25,000, are intended to give promising leaders in the nonprofit sector the opportunity for advanced study, research, and professional development.

Opera Colorado's 2009-2010 Season opened on 7 November 2009 with a new co-production of Offenbach's The Tales of Hoffmann. This first production of Hoffmann by Opera Colorado in 25 years starred Julian Gavin in the title role with soprano Pamela Armstrong as Olympia, Antonia, Giulietta and Stella, and Gaetan Laperriere as the four villains. The sets and costumes, designed by Andre Barbe, were created in cooperation with Opera Theatre of St. Louis and Boston Lyric Opera.

== Education and outreach ==
In addition to performances in the theatre, education and outreach performances have been given in countless schools, community centers, assisted living facilities in the Denver metro. Since 2002, Opera Colorado's education programs have grown dramatically. By 2009 Opera Colorado was serving over 43,000 students and adults throughout the state annually. Programs serving students include touring school programs such as Richard Wargo's The Music Shop and Charles Gounod's Romeo and Juliet as well as residency programs, in-school workshops, masterclasses and field trips to the Ellie Caulkins Opera House. For adults, Opera Colorado provides opportunities to meet the artists in their productions, pre-opera lectures and broadcast programs created in cooperation with Colorado Public Radio (broadcast on 88.1 FM KVOD).

== External links and sources ==
- Opera Colorado's official website
- Interview with Nathaniel Merrill by Bruce Duffie, December 2, 1982
- Opera Colorado's official channel on YouTube
