= Colorado Symphony =

Symphony orchestra in Denver, U.S.

- non-profit symphony orchestra
- Founded: 1989 (37 years ago)
- Location: Denver, Colorado, U.S.
- Concert hall: Boettcher Concert Hall
- Music director: Peter Oundjian (since 2025)
- Website: coloradosymphony.org

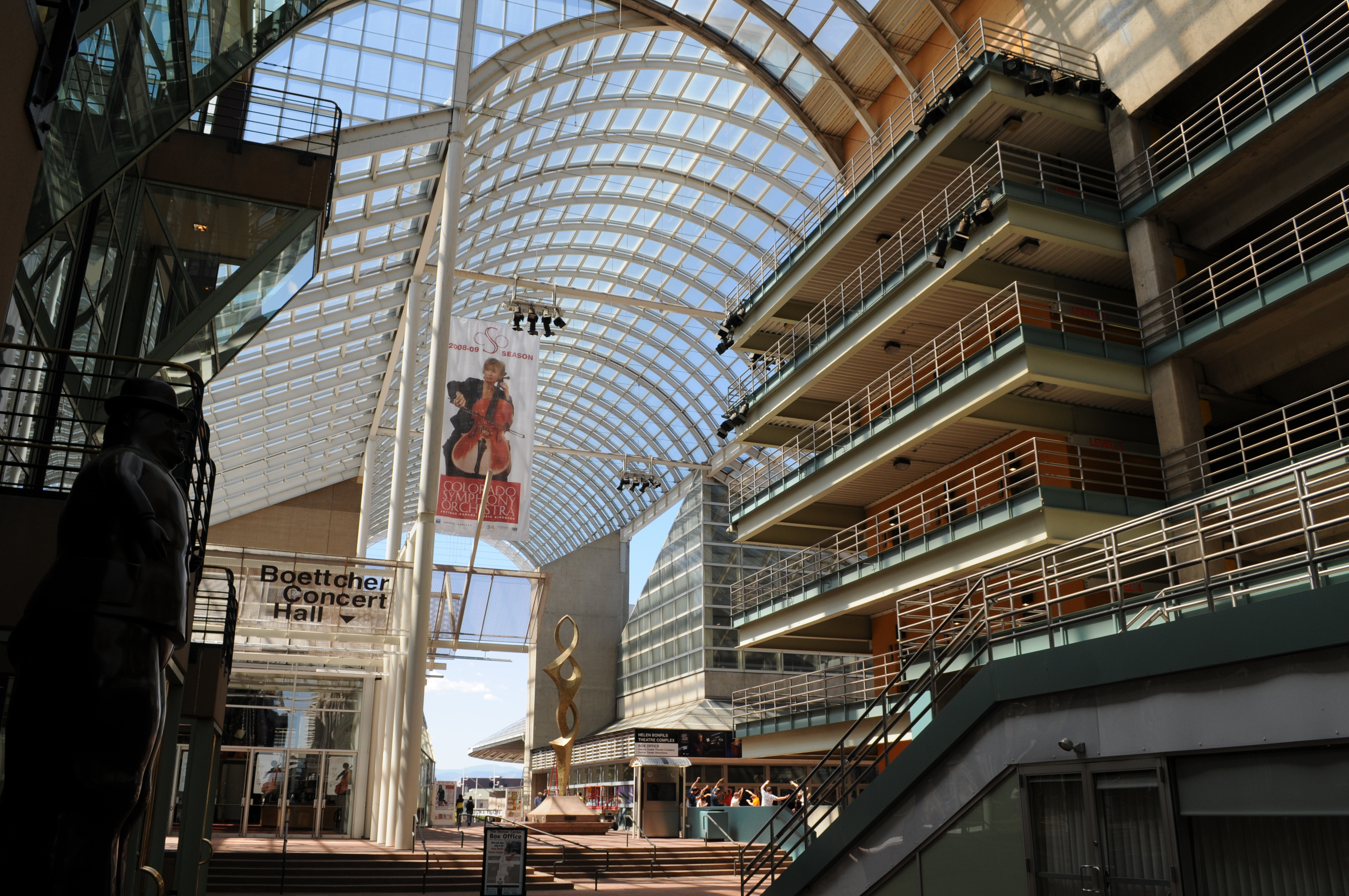
Denver Performing Arts Complex (2008)

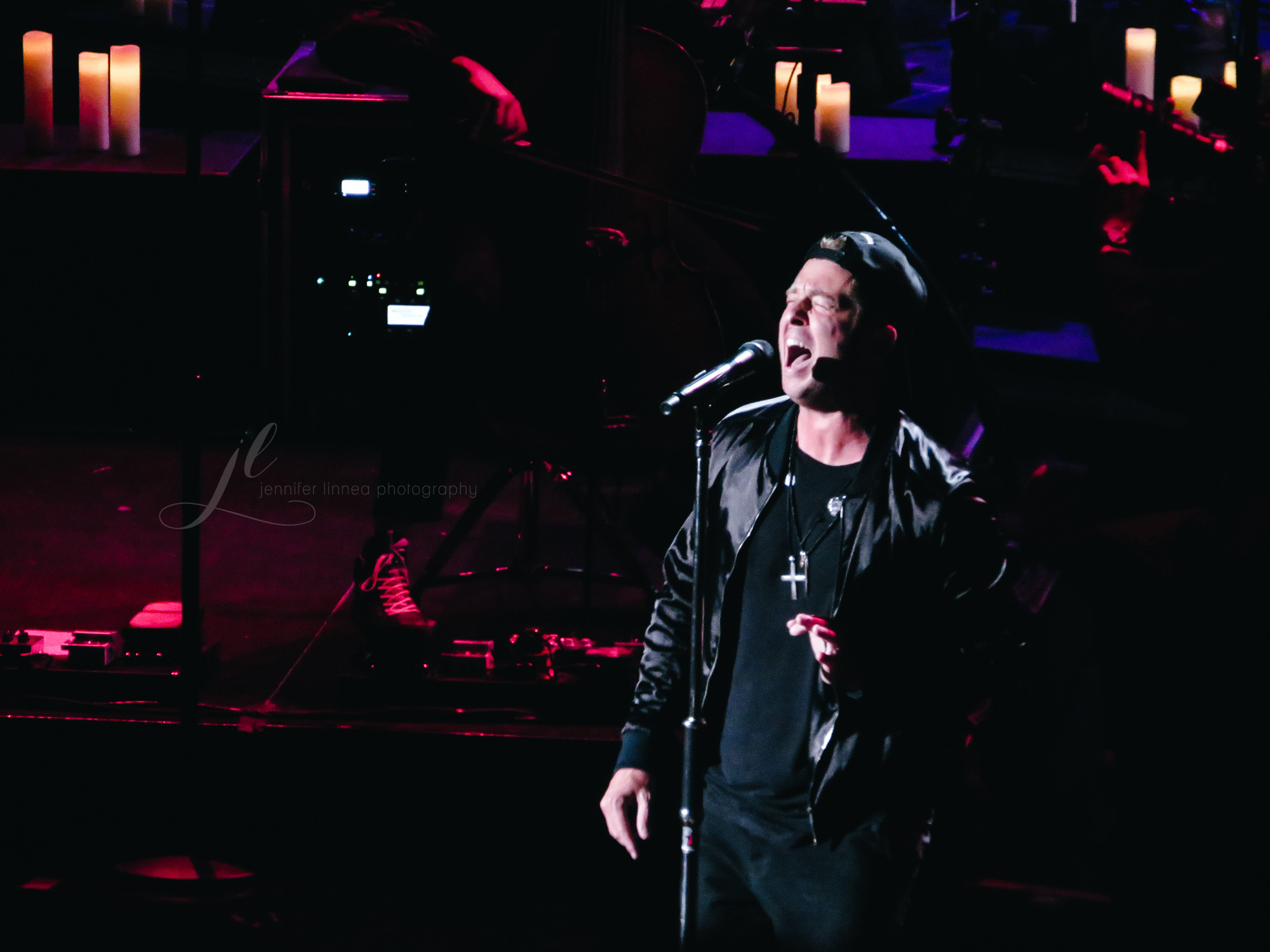
Frontman Ryan Tedder of pop-rock band OneRepublic, performing with the band and the Colorado Symphony at Red Rocks Amphitheatre in Morrison, Colorado, on August 26, 2019.

The Colorado Symphony is an American symphony orchestra, located in Denver, Colorado.

Established in 1989 as the successor to the Denver Symphony Orchestra, the Colorado Symphony performs in Boettcher Concert Hall, located in the Denver Performing Arts Complex in Downtown Denver, and throughout the Front Range Urban Corridor, presenting education and outreach programs, as well as Masterworks, Pops, Holiday, Family, and the Inside the Score and Symphony on the Rocks series.

== History ==
The Colorado Symphony began as the successor organization to the Denver Symphony Orchestra shortly after the Denver Symphony cancelled the remainder of its 1988–1989 season for financial reasons. In August 1989, percussionist Terry Smith and former principal bassoonist John Wetherill filed articles of incorporation with the Colorado secretary of state, founding the Colorado Symphony.

A dispute was going on between the Denver Symphony Orchestra's management and its musicians. As the registered agent of the newly formed organization, Smith was the primary target of potential lawsuits. The Denver Symphony's union contract prohibited musicians from joining competing ensembles. However, when the musicians voted to quit the Denver Symphony en masse and join the Colorado Symphony, legal challenges and threats to remove players diminished.

With the Denver Symphony filing for bankruptcy protection on October 4, 1989, the Colorado Symphony played its first concert on October 27. Days later, on November 1, Smith and Wetherill signed the new nonprofit corporation over to the musicians' elected representatives. The Denver Symphony Orchestra merged with the Colorado Symphony in May 1990.

The Colorado Symphony started initially as a smaller orchestra employing many of the Denver Symphony musicians. Since its founding, the Colorado Symphony roster has expanded to seventy-nine full-time musicians and one full-time librarian.

In 1993, Marin Alsop was appointed as the orchestra's principal conductor, and later became its music director. She is now its conductor laureate. During her tenure, the Colorado Symphony gained increased recognition on both the regional and national levels, and made a number of recordings on the Naxos Records label.

In April 2004, the Colorado Symphony appointed Jeffrey Kahane as the ninth music director in the 82-year history of the Denver and Colorado Symphony Orchestras, effective in 2005. The Denver Post described Kahane's a tenure as one "that has been marked by increased audiences and an uncommonly strong bond with the orchestra's musicians". In 2008, Kahane extended his Colorado Symphony contract through 2012. However, in July 2008, Kahane announced his resignation from the orchestra at the end of the 2009–2010 season. He cited a case of severe hypertension in 2007, which caused him to cancel several weeks of concerts, as the primary catalyst in his decision to concentrate more on his solo piano career:

"I had a real scare. That forced me to really stop and take a look at my life and say, 'You know what? You can't do everything.' I don't think I underestimated the job. I think I overestimated myself, not in my abilities but just being in a body and turning 50."

Andrew Litton became the orchestra's artistic advisor in September 2012, with an initial contract through the 2014–2015 season. In August 2013, the orchestra elevated Litton to music director, with immediate effect. In September 2015, the orchestra announced that Litton was to stand down from the music directorship after the 2015–2016 season, and to become its artistic advisor and principal guest conductor through the 2017–2018 season. With Litton conducting, the orchestra made its first recording for its own self-produced label, of Beethoven's Symphony No. 9.

In July 2016, Brett Mitchell first guest-conducted the orchestra. Based on this appearance, in September 2016, the orchestra named Mitchell its next music director, effective with the 2017–2018 season, with an initial four-year contract. He held the title of music director-designate for the 2016–2017 season. Mitchell concluded his tenure with the orchestra in 2021.

In February 2022, the orchestra announced the appointment of Peter Oundjian as its principal conductor. Oundjian had previously served as the orchestra's principal guest conductor from 2003 to 2006. In September 2024, the orchestra announced the promotion of Oundjian to the post of its music director, effective with the 2025–2026 season, with an initial contract of four years.

== Music directors ==
- Marin Alsop (1993–2005)
- Jeffrey Kahane (2005–2010)
- Andrew Litton (2013–2016)
- Brett Mitchell (2017–2021)
- Peter Oundjian (since 2025)

== See also ==
- List of symphony orchestras in the United States
- Music of Colorado
