= Remigio Paone =

Italian theatre producer

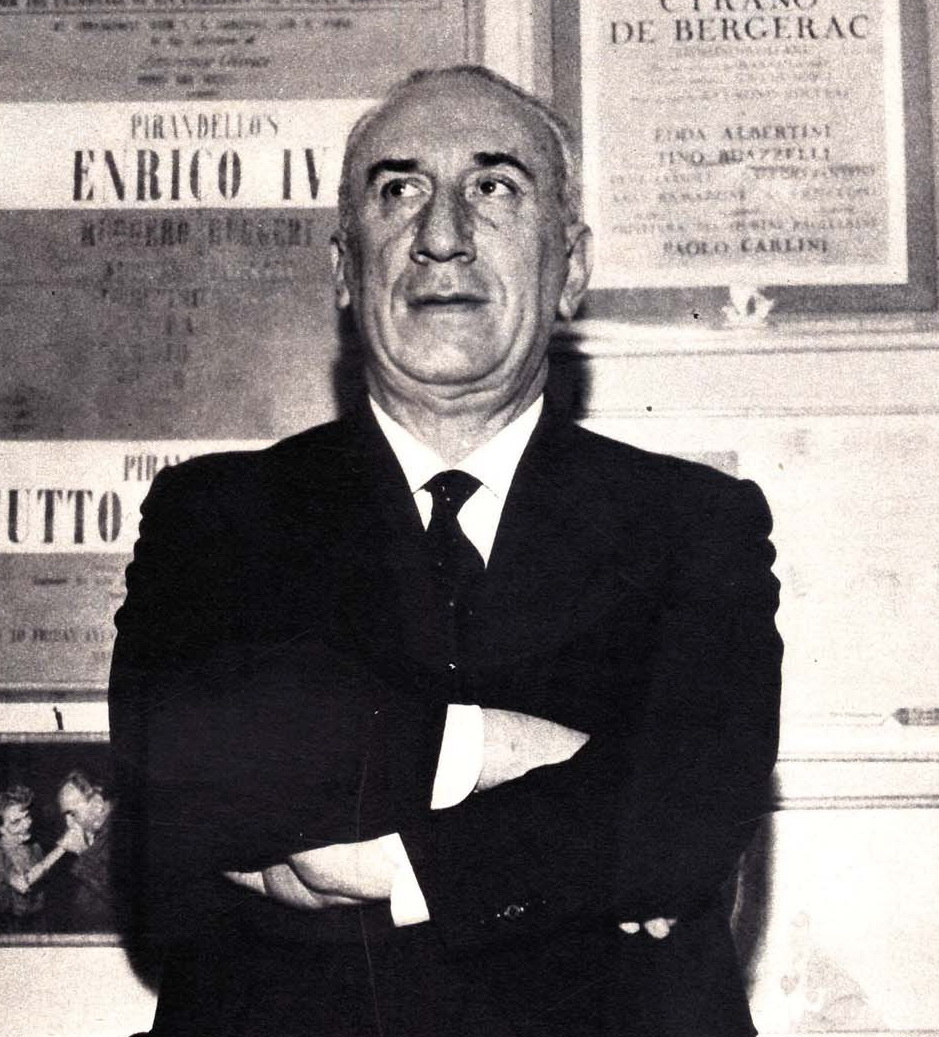
- Paone in 1963
- Born: 15 September 1899; Formia, Lazio, Italy
- Died: 7 January 1977 (aged 77); Milan, Lombardy, Italy
- Occupation(s): Producer, director

Remigio Paone (1899–1977) was an Italian journalist, theatre producer and director.

During the 1920s he was an associate of Luigi Pirandello, and took over the management of Sem Benelli's acting company when it was close to financial collapse. During the last years of the Second World War he was part of the Italian Resistance.

He was a leading impresario in postwar Milan, managing the Teatro Nuovo and later the rebuilt Teatro Manzoni. With the music critic Fredinando Ballo he founded the Orchestra i Pomeriggi Musicali.

== Bibliography ==
- Veniero Rizzardi & Angela Ida De Benedictis. New Music on the Radio: Experiences at the Studio Di Fonologia of the RAI, Milan, 1954–1959. RAI ERI, 2000.
