= Assunta Spina (1948 film) =

1948 film

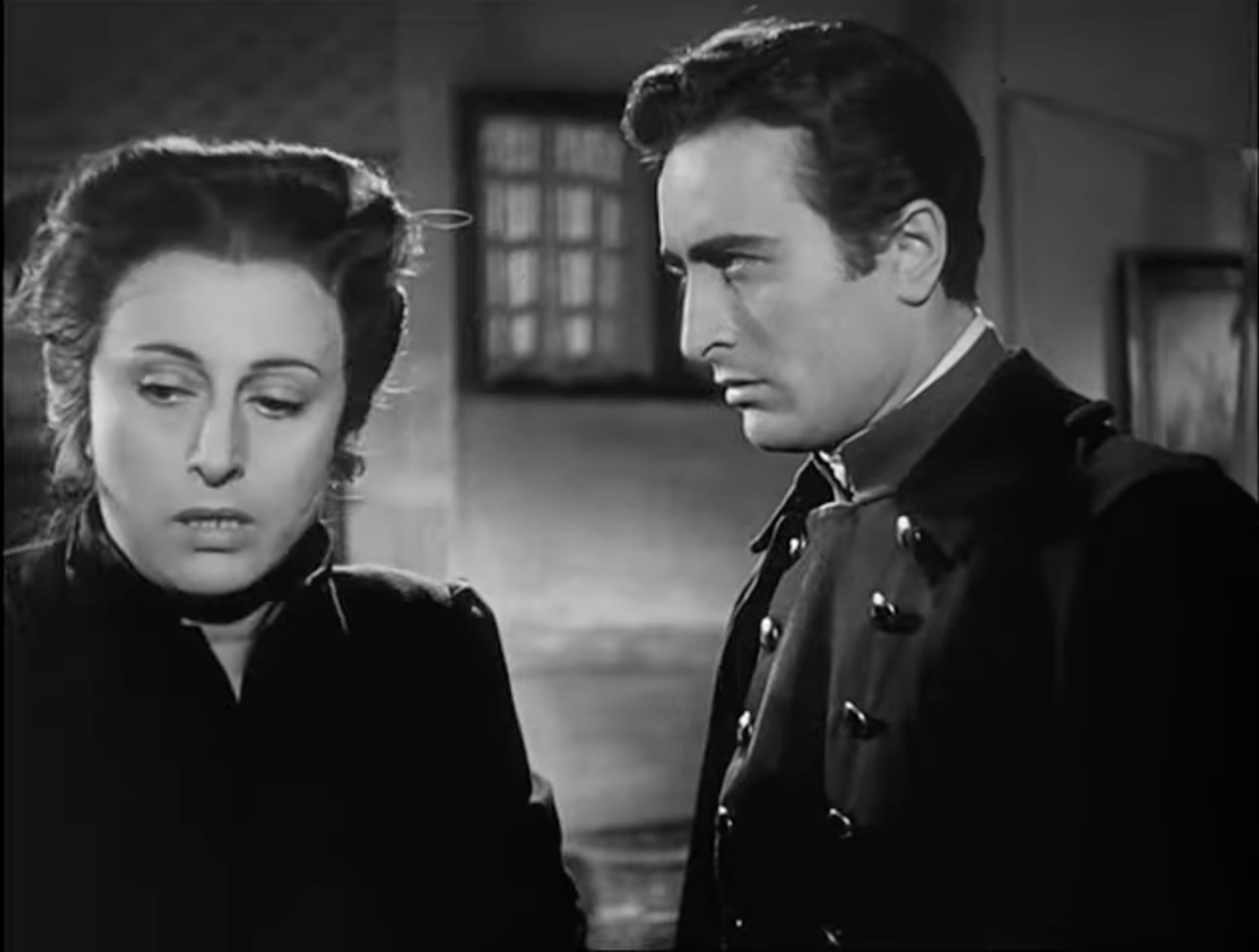
- Magnani and Landi in a film scene
- Directed by: Mario Mattoli
- Written by: Eduardo De Filippo; Gino Capriolo
- Based on: Assunta Spina by Salvatore Di Giacomo
- Produced by: Paolo Frascá; Vittorio Mottini
- Starring: Anna Magnani; Eduardo De Filippo; Antonio Centa; Aldo Bufi Landi
- Cinematography: Gábor Pogány
- Edited by: Fernando Tropea
- Music by: Renzo Rossellini
- Production company: Ora Film
- Distributed by: Titanus
- Release date: 11 March 1948
- Running time: 91 minutes
- Country: Italy
- Language: Italian

Assunta Spina is a 1948 Italian drama film directed by Mario Mattoli and starring Anna Magnani, Antonio Centa and Giacomo Furia. It was adapted from Salvatore Di Giacomo's 1909 play of the same title. It was released in the United States with the title Scarred. It was shot at the Farnesina Studios in Rome and on location in Naples. The film's sets were designed by the art director Piero Filippone. Distributed by Titanus it earned around 70 million lira at the domestic box office.

== Plot ==
The film takes place in Naples at the turn of the twentieth century. Assunta, a passionate and impulsive woman, is scarred on the face by her lover Michele for making him jealous. He is sentenced to serve two years in prison in Avellino, despite her efforts to exonerate him at the trial. While he is inside she begins a relationship with a court official. When Michele is released and kills the man, she chooses to take the blame for the crime.

== Cast ==
- Anna Magnani as Assunta Spina
- Eduardo De Filippo as Michele Boccadifuoco
- Antonio Centa as Chancellor Federico Funelli
- Aldo Bufi Landi as Brigadier Marcello Flaiano
- Titina De Filippo as Emilia Forcinelli
- Giacomo Furia as Tittariello
- Ugo D'Alessio as Epanimonda Pesce
- Pietro Carloni as President of the Court
- Aldo Giuffrè as Brigadier Mancuso
