= The Fear of Love =

1920 film

- Directed by: Roberto Roberti
- Starring: Gustavo Serena
- Production company: Caesar Film
- Distributed by: Caesar Film
- Release date: April 1920
- Country: Italy
- Languages: Silent; Italian intertitles

The Fear of Love (Italian: La paura di amare) is a 1920 Italian silent film directed by Roberto Roberti and starring Gustavo Serena.

== Cast ==
- Alberto Albertini
- Gustavo Serena
- Guido Trento
- Vera Vergani

== Bibliography ==
- Aldo Bernardini & Vittorio Martinelli. Il cinema muto italiano: I film del dopoguerra, 1920. Nuova ERI, 1995.
