= Denver Performing Arts Complex =

Entertainment complex in Colorado, U.S.

Coordinates: 39°44′40″N 104°59′51″W

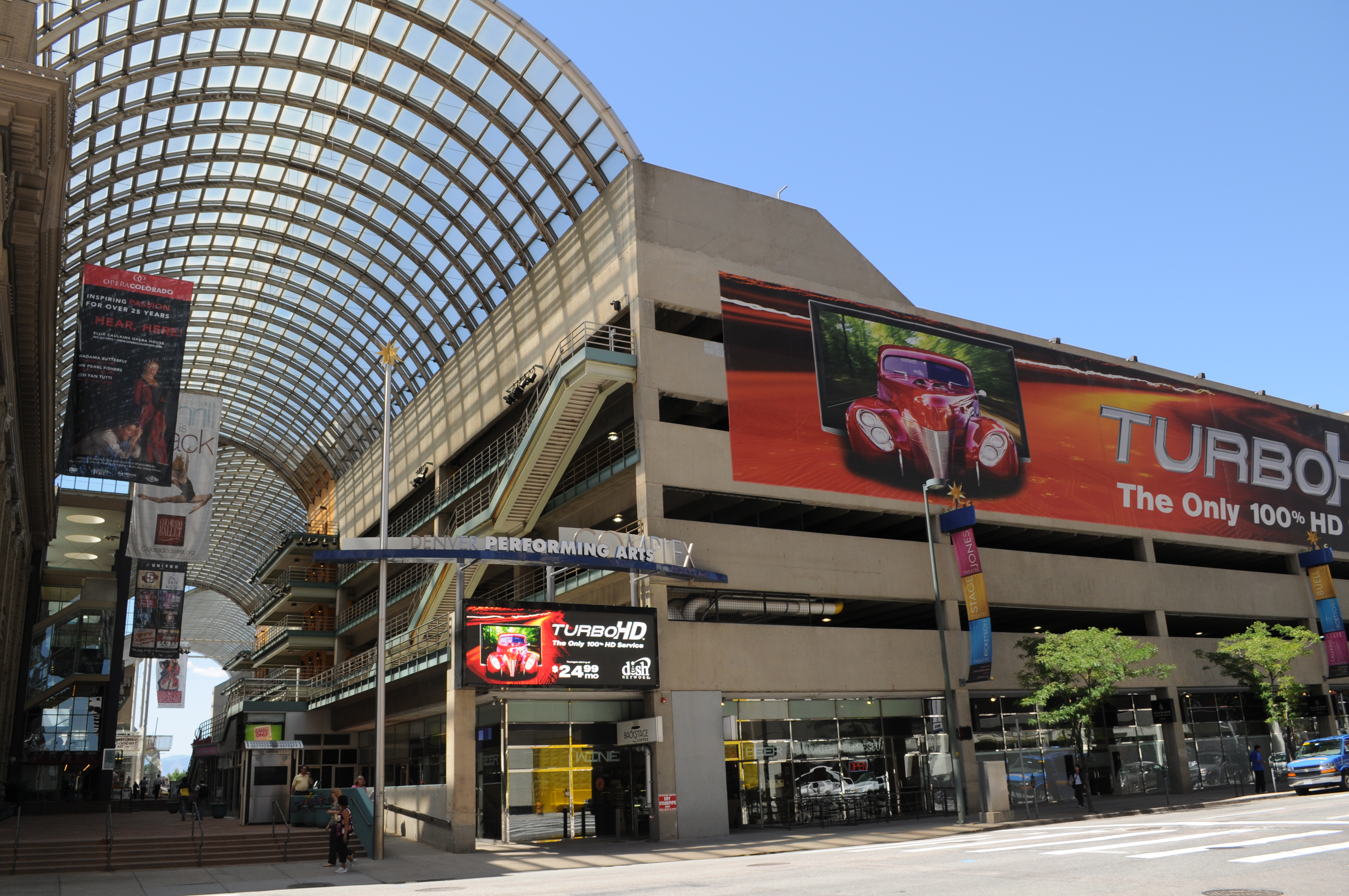
Denver Performing Arts Complex front view

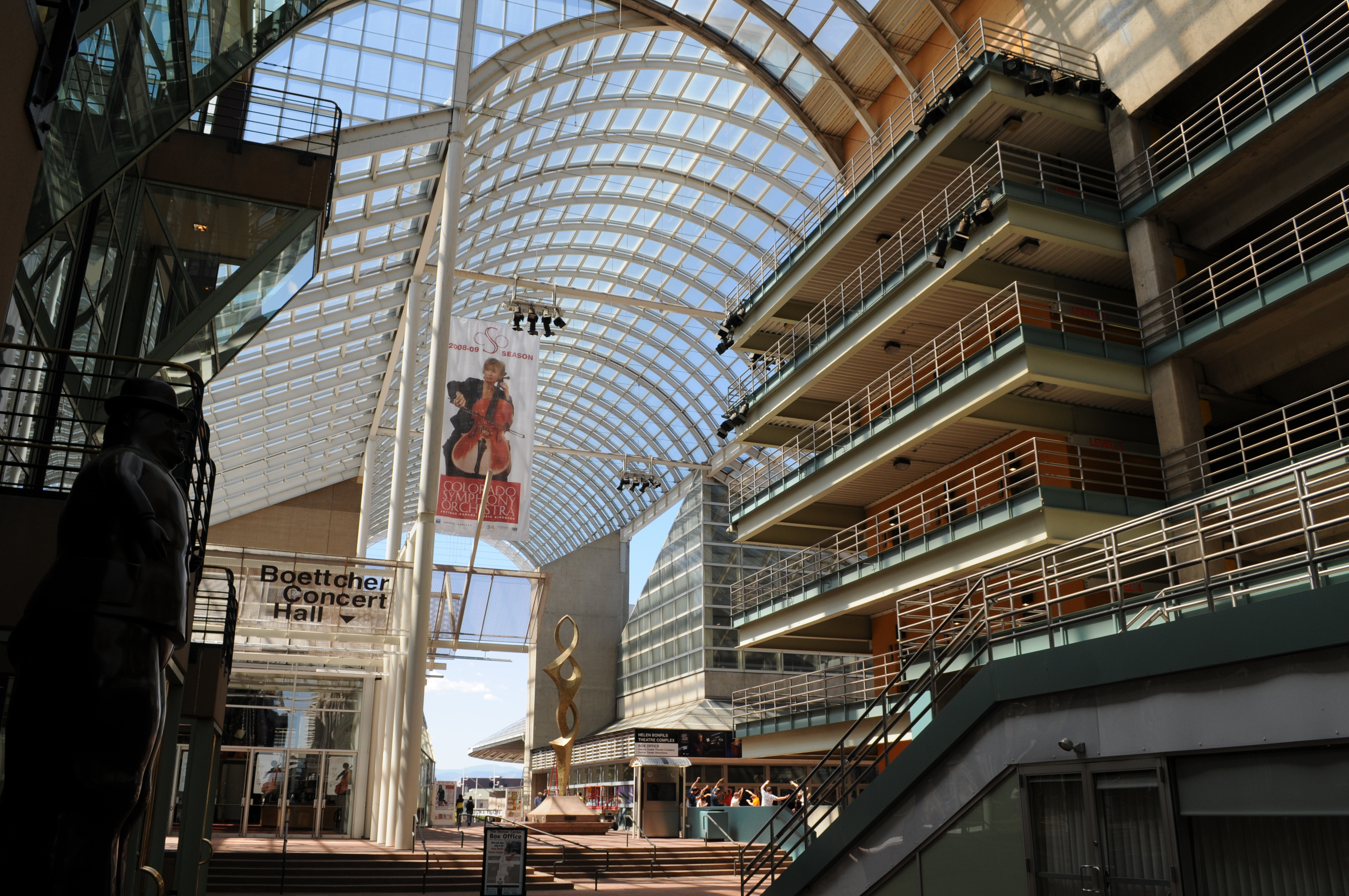
Denver Performing Arts Complex

The Denver Performing Arts Complex ("Arts Complex") in Denver, Colorado, is one of the largest performing arts centers in the United States. The Arts Complex is a four-block, 12-acre (49,000 m^{2}) site containing ten performance spaces with over 10,000 seats connected by an 80-foot-tall (24 m) glass roof. It is home to a professional theater company and also hosts Broadway musical tours, contemporary dance and ballet, chorales, symphony orchestras, opera productions, and pop stars.

The City and County of Denver’s Arts & Venues owns and operates the three largest theaters in the Arts Complex – the Ellie Caulkins Opera House, the Temple Hoyne Buell Theatre and the Boettcher Concert Hall. The Helen Bonfils Theatre Complex within the Arts Complex is managed and operated by the Denver Center for the Performing Arts.

Performing arts organizations that regularly appear in the performance spaces include the Colorado Ballet, the Colorado Symphony, Opera Colorado and the Denver Center for the Performing Arts’ theatrical divisions – Denver Center Broadway and Denver Center Theatre Company.

== Performance and other facilities ==
The Denver Performing Arts Complex houses the following performance spaces:

- The Ellie Caulkins Opera House is the main venue inside the Quigg Newton Denver Municipal Auditorium. Its seating capacity is 2,225.
- The Temple Hoyne Buell Theater is designed for amplified musicals, dramatic plays, comedy acts and concerts. Its seating capacity is 2,884.
- Boettcher Concert Hall is the nation's first symphony hall in the round, designed to place the audience close to the stage. Its seating capacity is 2,679.
- Helen Bonfils Theatre Complex
  - The Wolf Theatre is the largest of the four theaters in the Bonfils Theater Complex. It was previously known as the Stage Theater. It has a seating capacity of 610. The theater features audio-enhancing walls and a thrust stage. It was remodeled in 2020-2021, and its current name honors long-time patrons and benefactors in Denver's theater community.
  - The Kilstrom Theatre, renamed in 2021, was previously known as the Space Theater. A theatre-in-the-round, the space allows for flexible staging with a capacity of up to 380 seats. It was remodeled in 2017 with new wheelchair accessibility.
  - The Singleton Theatre was previously known as the Ricketson Theater. Recently renamed to honor William Dean Singleton, who was involved in the creation of the DCPA in its early years, it has been recently remodeled to include easier elevator access. It has 200 seats in a proscenium theater. It was originally created as an art-house movie theater.
  - The Jones Theatre features 196 seats and a thrust stage. It has a separate entrance on the outside of the building, near the intersection with Speer Boulevard. This theater is often used for more experimental productions under the DCPA's Off-Center brand.
  - The Garner Galleria Theatre has a seating capacity of 183.
  - The Donald R. Seawell Grand Ballroom is a pentagonal room with panoramic views of the mountains. This 10,000-square-foot (930 m^{2}) facility holds a maximum capacity of 1,029 people. It can accommodate a variety of functions and performances, featuring its own catering kitchen, freight elevator, tables, chairs, portable dance floor, moveable platform staging and lighting, audio, video, and projection systems.
- Dazzle is a jazz club that joined the Arts Complex in 2023. it is located at 1080 14th Street. It has a seating capacity of 140.

== Sculpture Park ==
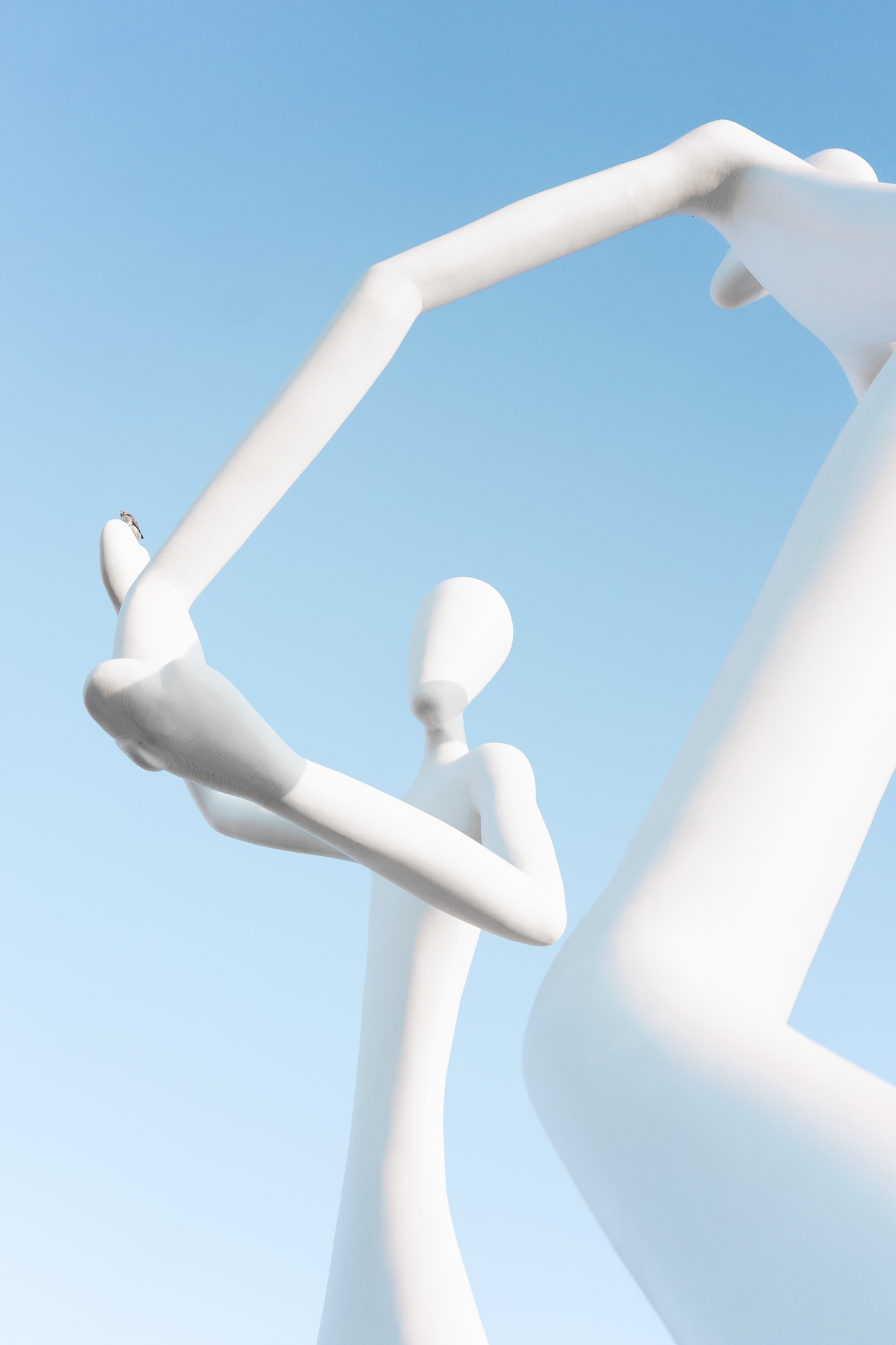
Dancers, from below

Sculpture Park is located at the southwest corner of the complex at N. Speer Blvd. and Champa St. Often called 'the dancing aliens' locally because of the sculptures' scale, the official name is:

- Dancers by Jonathan Borofsky. The sculpture consists of two 60-foot silver-colored dancers made of steel and fiberglass.

== See also ==
- List of concert halls
