= Dancers (Borofsky) =

Public sculpture in Denver, Colorado, U.S.

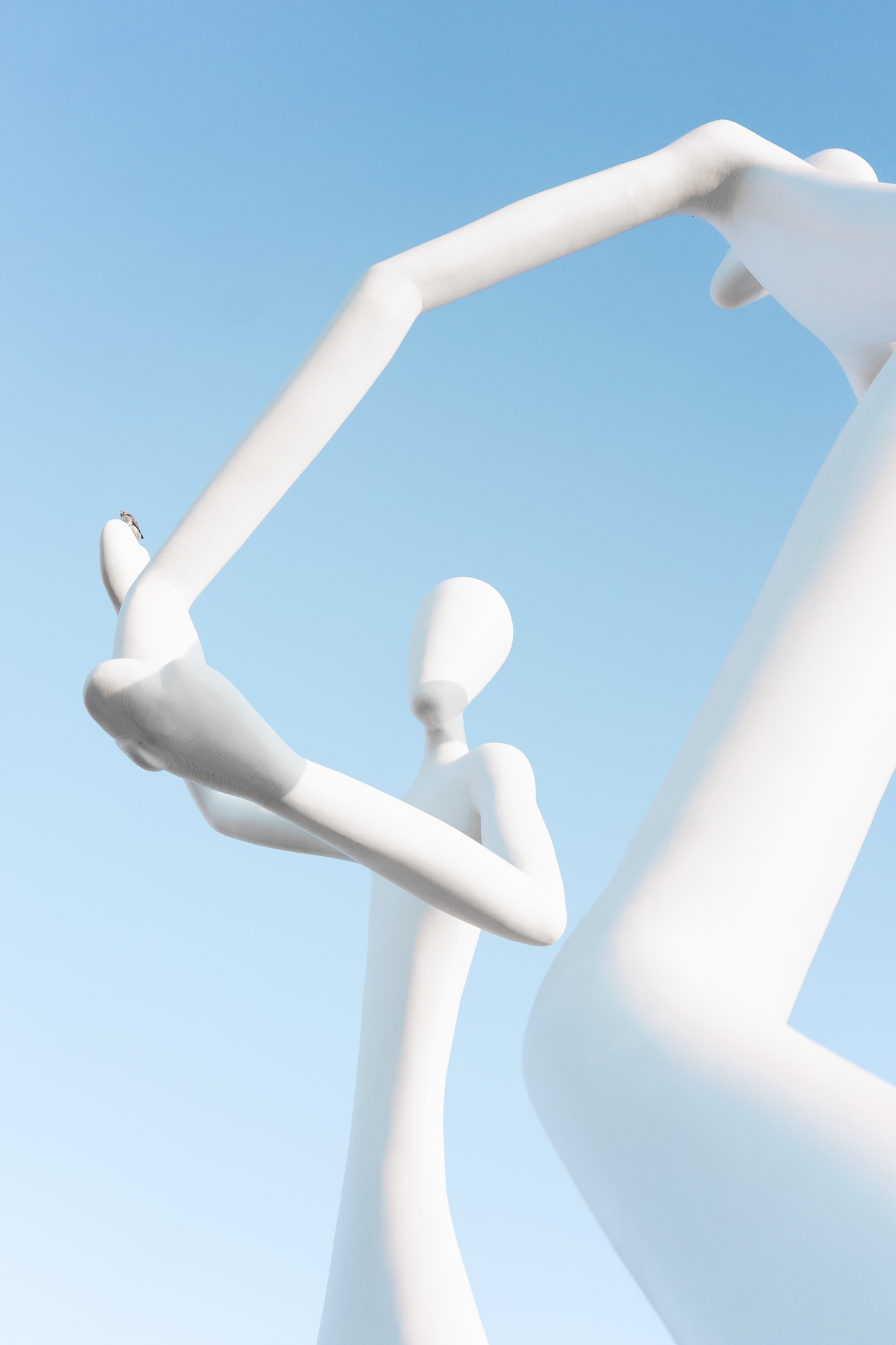
- Dancers, viewed from below
- Artist: Jonathan Borofsky
- Year: 2003
- Medium: Fiberglass and steel
- Dimensions: 18 m (60 ft)
- Weight: 25,000 lbs (each figure)
- Location: Denver, Colorado, U.S.
- 39.743046°N 104.999258°W

Dancers is a monumental public sculpture by American artist Jonathan Borofsky, installed in 2003 near the Denver Performing Arts Complex in downtown Denver, Colorado. The work consists of two elongated, semi-abstract human figures, each approximately 60 feet (18 m) tall, depicted in an informal dancing pose. Commissioned as the inaugural permanent artwork for the Performing Arts Sculpture Park, Dancers was, at the time of its installation, the largest and most expensive public sculpture ever commissioned by the City and County of Denver.

== History ==
=== Background and commissioning ===
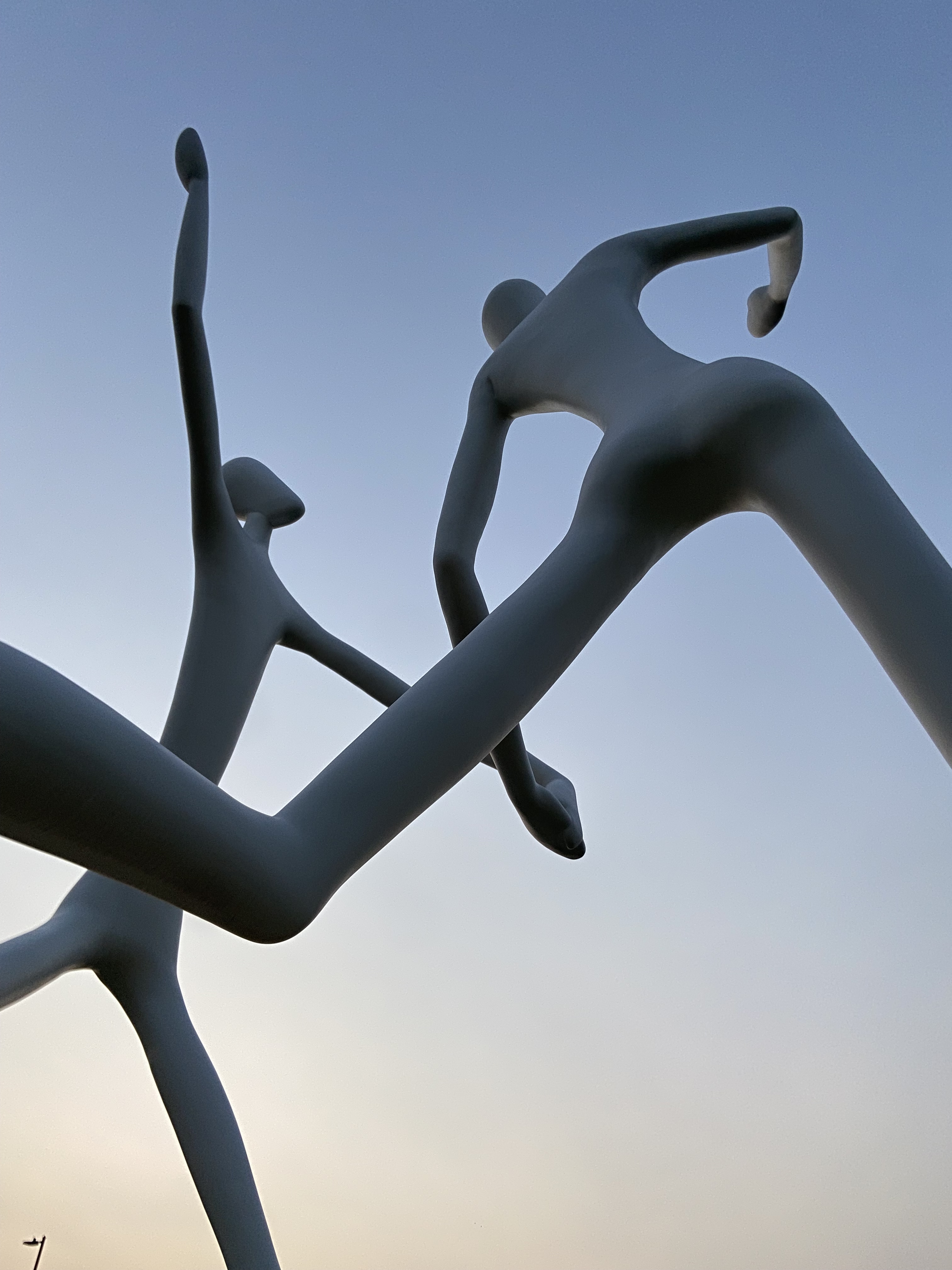
A bird's eye view of Dancers

The Performing Arts Sculpture Park, a 3.5-acre site west of the Denver Performing Arts Complex along Speer Boulevard, was completed in 1997 but remained largely unused for several years. City officials and arts advocates envisioned the park as the location for a major public artwork that could function as a cultural landmark for Denver.

In 1997, a selection panel convened by the Mayor’s Commission on Art, Culture and Film reviewed proposals from several nationally and internationally recognized artists. In 1998, Borofsky was selected to create a large-scale figurative sculpture intended to serve as a signature work for the site.

Although commissioned in 1998, the project was delayed for several years due to fundraising shortfalls. Initial plans relied on private donations raised by the Denver Art, Culture and Film Foundation, which proved insufficient to complete the project. In 2001, Mayor Wellington Webb proposed reallocating a portion of the public art budget associated with the expansion of the Colorado Convention Center to help fund Dancers, drawing on money generated through Denver’s percent for art ordinance.

The proposal drew opposition from several members of the Denver City Council, including Councilwoman Susan Barnes-Gelt, who argued that voters had approved convention center bond funding with the expectation that it would be used solely for that project. Supporters countered that the sculpture would benefit both the convention center and the performing arts complex due to their proximity.

After debate, City Council approved a revised funding package that included approximately $400,000 from the convention center art budget, supplemented by private fundraising and city appropriations. The total cost of the project ultimately reached about $1.58 million.

=== Fabrication and installation ===
Dancers was fabricated by La Paloma, a California-based firm that had previously collaborated with Borofsky on large-scale works. The sculpture features a steel internal framework with a fiberglass exterior, a construction approach Borofsky said was enabled by advances in computer-aided design and fabrication technology. Each figure weighs more than 25,000 pounds.

Installation took place in May 2003, with each six-story-tall figure erected by crane. The piece was formally dedicated on June 12, 2003, during a public ceremony attended by Mayor Webb and the artist.

== Reception ==
Critical and public response to Dancers was extensive and often polarized. The Denver Post arts critic Kyle MacMillan published multiple columns evaluating the sculpture before and after its installation. While acknowledging its scale and visibility, he argued that the work lacked the artistic distinction expected of a signature civic artwork, describing it as “innocuous.” In year-end coverage of Denver’s arts scene, MacMillan identified Dancers as the city’s “most controversial artwork” of 2003, noting that public reactions ranged from mild approval to ridicule, including comparisons to cartoon figures.

Despite criticism, the sculpture continued to be referenced in discussions of Denver’s broader public art strategy, including proposals to develop an “avenue of art” along Speer Boulevard anchored by large-scale works commissioned as part of the convention center expansion.

In December 2013, the sculpture received renewed attention after Denver-based musician and “guerrilla artist” Kyle Williams crocheted and installed a Colorado-flag-themed swimsuit on one of the figures. According to contemporaneous reporting, the garment used nine skeins of yarn, took approximately 3.5 weeks to design and produce, measured roughly 15 feet long, and was secured using zip ties during a daytime installation.
