= Assunta Spina (play) =

1909 play

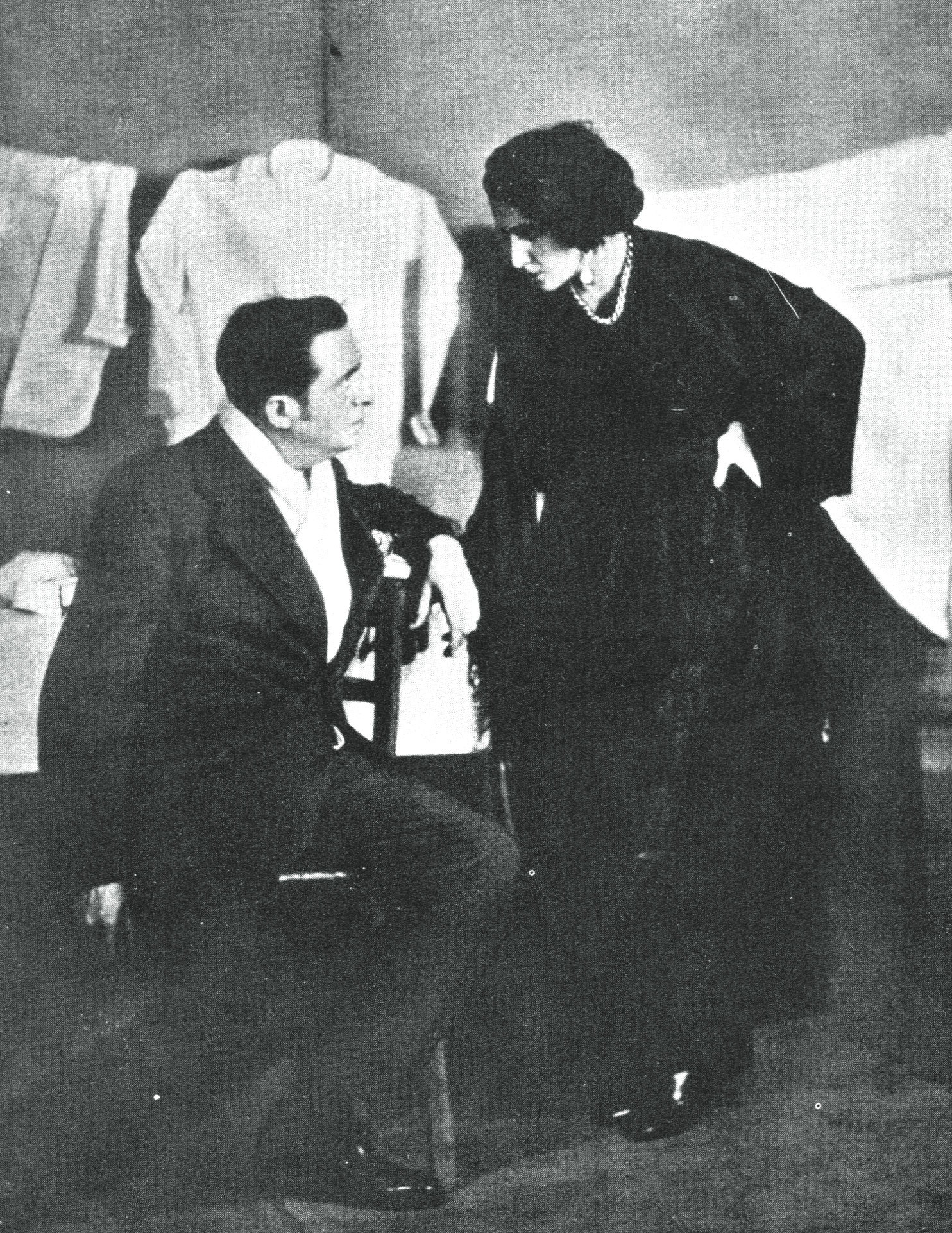
- A 1927 performance with Vera Vergani in the title role.
- Written by: Salvatore Di Giacomo
- Original language: Italian
- Genre: Tragedy, Melodrama
- Setting: Naples, 1900

Premiere
- Date premiered: 27 March 1909
- Place premiered: Teatro Nuovo, Naples

Assunta Spina is a 1909 tragic play by the Italian writer Salvatore Di Giacomo, based on his earlier short story of the same name. It premiered at the Teatro Nuovo in Naples with Adelina Magnetti in the title role and a cast that also included Gennaro Pantalena and Francesca Bertini, who would subsequently play Assunta in the 1915 film. A 1927 revival at the Teatro Manzoni in Milan starred Vera Vergani.

== Synopsis ==
The protagonist Assunta Spina is a young woman of Naples who has many male admirers, including Michele Boccadifuoco a butcher. One day in a fit of jealousy he attacks and scars her in the street. Despite her efforts to cover up for him, he is arrested and sentenced to two years imprisonment in Avellino. In the meantime she begins an affair with a court official, not knowing that he already has a family. When Michele is released from prison, she confessed everything to him. His pride wounded, he goes immediately and stabs her lover to death with a knife. However it is Assunta who takes the blame for the crime to the authorities.

== Adaptations ==
The play has been adapted various times in different forms, including three films

- Assunta Spina (1915 film), a silent film starring Francesca Bertini
- Assunta Spina (1930 film), a silent Italian film starring Rina De Liguoro
- Assunta Spina (1948 film), a film starring Anna Magnani

== Bibliography ==
- D'Amora, Mariano. A History of Neapolitan Drama in the Twentieth Century. Cambridge Scholars Publishing, 2015.
- Goble, Alan. The Complete Index to Literary Sources in Film. Walter de Gruyter, 1999.
