= Teatro Nuovo (Milan) =

New Theater
- Teatro Nuovo
- Interactive map of New Theater
- Location: Piazza San Babila, Milan, Italy

Construction
- Opened: 22 December 1938; 87 years ago
- Architect: Emilio Lancia

Website
- www.teatronuovo.it

The Teatro Nuovo (New Theater) is a theater in Milan, located on the Piazza San Babila in the lower level of the Palazzo del Toro. The theater, designed by architect Emilio Lancia, was the project of the impresario Remigio Paone. It was inaugurated on 22 December 1938 with a performance of Eduardo De Filippo's comedy Ditegli sempre di sì.

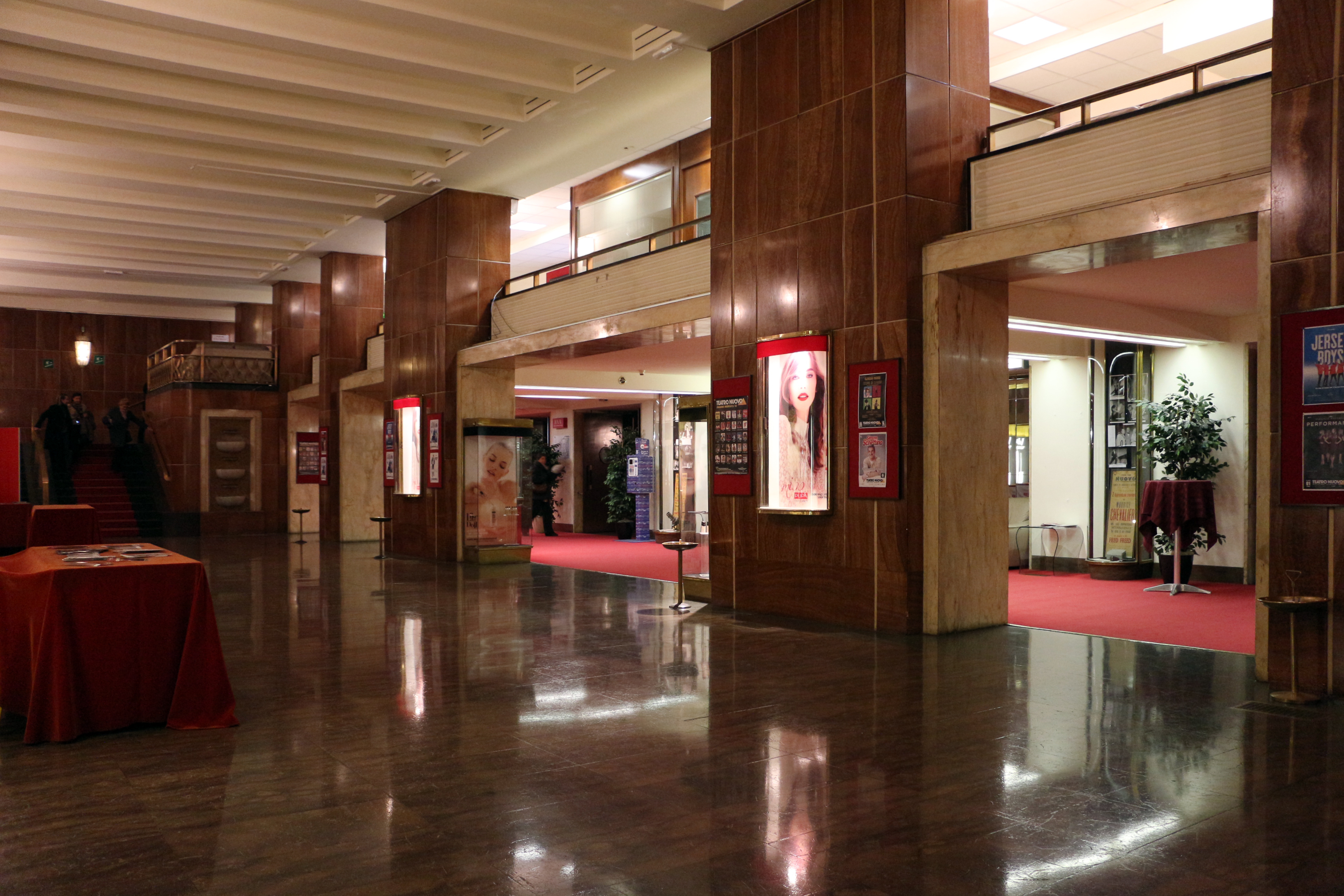
The theater's foyer

Although its repertoire is largely devoted to theatre, musicals, and revues, it has also hosted opera performances. Opera singers and conductors who have made their professional debuts there include Riccardo Chailly (Werther, 1970) and Piero Cappuccilli (Pagliacci, 1957).
