= James Feddeck =

Orchestra conductor

James Feddeck is an American orchestra conductor.

As a youth, Feddeck learned the piano. From 2001 to 2006, Feddeck studied oboe, organ, piano, and conducting at the Oberlin Conservatory of Music. He earned B.Mus. and M.Mus. degrees from Oberlin in 2005 and 2006. He was the first recipient of the Outstanding Young Alumni Award from Oberlin in 2010. At the Aspen Music Festival, Feddeck was a conducting fellow from 2006 to 2008, and assistant conductor for the 2009 season. From the Aspen Festival, he received the Robert J. Harth conducting prize and the Aspen Conducting Prize.

From 2009 to 2013, Feddeck was Assistant Conductor of The Cleveland Orchestra. In 2009, the Solti Foundation U.S. awarded Feddeck a career assistance grant, and in 2013, awarded him its highest honour, the Sir Georg Solti Conducting Award.

In 2020, Feddeck became Principal Conductor of Orchestra i Pomeriggi Musicali in Milan, Italy, and concluded the tenure in 2025.

Cultural offices
Preceded by Antonio Manacorda	Principal Conductor, Orchestra i Pomeriggi Musicali; 2020–present	Succeeded by incumbent
