= Strings Music Festival =

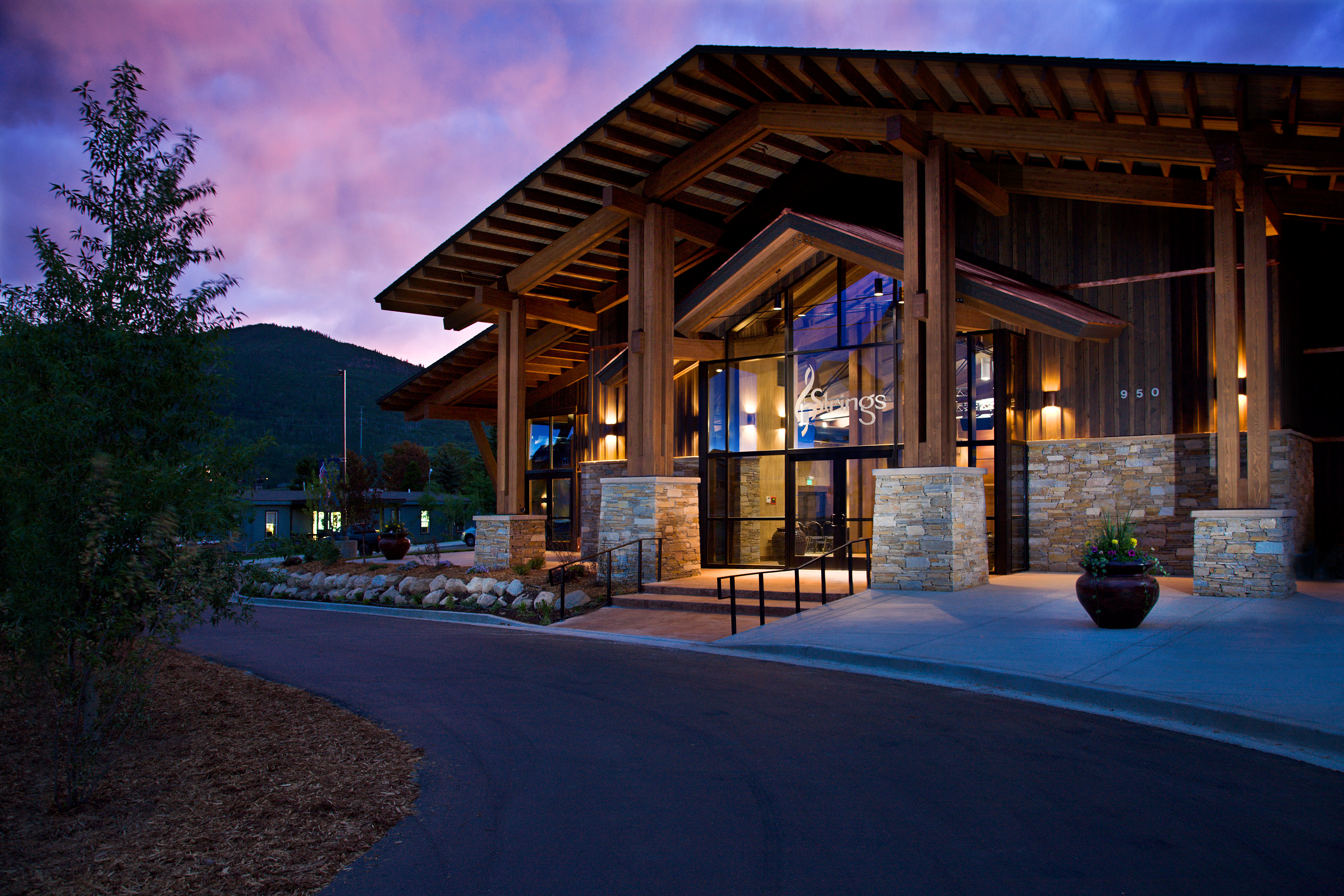
Strings Music Festival pavilion

Strings Music Festival is an annual summer music festival held in Steamboat Springs, Colorado. It presents an 8-week program of youth music performances in genres including classical, jazz, blues, Americana, and country.

== About ==
Strings Music Festival is a 501(c)(3) organization, presenting more than 90 classical and non-classical music events each year, with the majority taking place during an eight-week summer season from June through August. Additional concerts and programs are held throughout the year. Programming includes orchestral and chamber music, contemporary classical music, jazz, blues, Americana, youth performances, lectures, outreach programs, and free public events.

The organization was founded in 1988 under the name Strings in the Mountains, initially presenting eight classical performances on the deck of the Steamboat Athletic Club. In 1990, the festival expanded its programming to include non-classical artists, with performances by Leo Kottke and Karla Bonoff. In 1992, a tent venue was erected on the Torian Plum property, increasing audience capacity from approximately 300 to 500 seats. That same year, the festival gained national attention when Leonard Slatkin, then conductor of the St. Louis Symphony Orchestra, led a chamber orchestra performance that was covered by CBS Morning News.

In 2003, the organization purchased seven acres of land for a permanent home at its current site at 900 Strings Road in Steamboat Springs. In 2007, the organization adopted its current name, Strings Music Festival. A year later, a permanent music pavilion was completed. The $4.3 million facility was designed by Steamboat Architectural Associates in collaboration with D.L. Adams Associates of Denver, Colorado, and was constructed over a nine-month period.

== Directors ==
In 2015, Strings Music Festival began its 28th season with Michael Sachs—a leading soloist, recitalist, teacher, and author—as music director. Sachs, who has served as principal trumpet of the Cleveland Orchestra since 1988, joined the festival in the fall of 2014. His programming for the 2015 season included guest artists drawn from major orchestras and music institutions in the United States and abroad, including those in Chicago, Boston, New York, Philadelphia, Dallas, and Los Angeles, as well as returning chamber and orchestral musicians who had previously appeared at the festival.

From 2009 through 2014, the festival's classical music program was led by Andrés Cárdenes and Monique Mead as co-music directors. Cárdenes, a Cuban-born violinist, studied under Josef Gingold and gained international recognition after winning second prize at the 1982 International Tchaikovsky Competition. He has performed as a soloist with more than 100 orchestras and served as concertmaster of the Pittsburgh Symphony Orchestra for 21 seasons, as well as artistic director of the Pittsburgh Symphony Chamber Orchestra beginning in 1999. Cárdenes also teaches at Carnegie Mellon University and has held guest teaching appointments at institutions including the Curtis Institute of Music, the Royal Conservatory of Music in Toronto, the Shanghai Conservatory, and Mount Royal University in Calgary. He also serves as president of the jury of the Stradivarius International Violin Competition.

During their final season as classical music directors, Cárdenes and Mead programmed a broad range of repertoire, including works by composers such as Pyotr Ilyich Tchaikovsky, Astor Piazzolla, Antonín Dvořák, and Wolfgang Amadeus Mozart, as well as selections from Broadway and other popular traditions.
