= Cleveland Youth Wind Symphony =

American orchestra founded in 1989

The Cleveland Youth Wind Symphony is an instrumental performing ensemble based in Cleveland, Ohio. The ensemble is selected regularly to perform on the international level. Their latest international tour was in June 2018, when the wind ensemble travelled to Italy to perform in the Florence Festival of Youth Orchestras. In summer 2020, the group traveled to Ireland. The group has also traveled to Australia where they performed in the Sydney Opera House, combining with three other ensembles to premier a new David Gillingham piece, The Sails of Time.

== Origins ==
=== Founding ===
The Cleveland Youth Wind Symphony (CYWS) was founded in 1989 by Gary M. Ciepluch and Robert McAllister. The group was created as a joint venture between Case Western Reserve University and the Cleveland Institute of Music. In 1995, the group became too large, and was thus split into upper and lower parts, The Cleveland Youth Wind Symphony Group I and II, respectively. Both groups are full ensembles, the former being conducted by Ciepluch, and the latter by Melissa Lichter. As of November 1, 2009, another group has been added to CYWS. According to the announcement by Ciepluch at the concert on November 1, 2009, there are so many talented young people in the area schools, he and the other directors decided to start this third group. While there are three groups, there are only two levels, as both Group II Symphonic Winds and Concert Winds play the same level of music. The groups are intended to provide talented high school students the opportunity to play exceptionally difficult high school pieces, college literature, and Grade 6 professional works. Members come from about 75 area high schools. Cleveland Youth Wind Symphony, both groups I and II, is in residence at Cleveland State University.

=== Directors ===
After Cleveland Youth Wind Symphony's 2016 European tour, Ciepluch retired from his post as director of Cleveland Youth Wind Symphony. Melissa Lichtler, Dan Crain, and Darren Allen became co-directors of the group, with Crain directing Group I, Lichtler directing Group II Symphonic Winds, and Allen directing Group II Concert Winds. In 2022, CYWS officially became a 501(c)(3) organization.

=== Orchestration ===
Both Group I and II are standard large wind symphony orchestras. This orchestration includes flutes, piccolos, clarinets, bass clarinets, oboes, bassoons, alto, tenor, and baritone saxophones, horns in F, trumpets, trombones, euphoniums, tubas, and a myriad of percussion. However, the advanced literature that both groups perform often calls for a more diverse orchestration. Thus, an English horn is not uncommon, nor is a soprano saxophone during solo sections. More uncommonly, Group I required a member to play contrabassoon while premiering Christopher Tucker's A Light in the Deep. Piano accompaniments to pieces are fairly common, and the group membership almost certainly contains an accomplished pianist.
