= Salvatore Di Giacomo =

Italian poet (1860–1934)

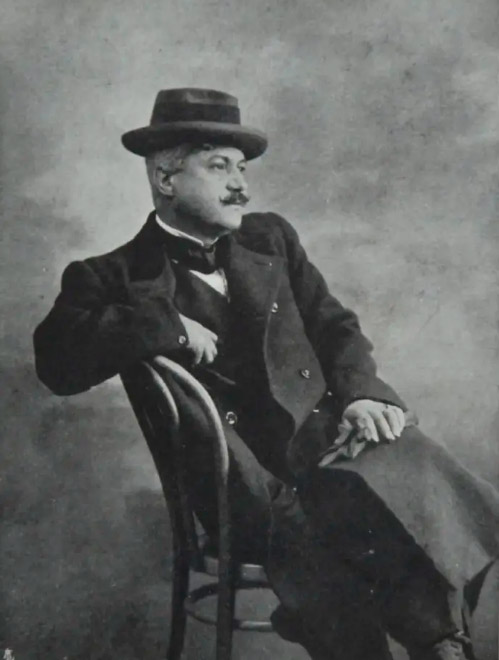
- Salvatore Di Giacomo, c. 1915
- Born: 12 March 1860; Naples, Kingdom of the Two Sicilies
- Died: 5 April 1934 (aged 74); Naples, Italy

Salvatore Di Giacomo (12 March 1860 – 5 April 1934) was an Italian poet, songwriter, playwright and fascist, one of the signatories to the Manifesto of the Fascist Intellectuals.

Di Giacomo is credited as being one of those responsible for renewing Neapolitan language poetry at the beginning of the 20th century. The language of Salvatore Di Giacomo is, however, not the everyday Neapolitan language of his contemporaries; it has a distinct 18th-century flavour to it, with archaisms that recall the golden age of Neapolitan culture. This was the period between 1750 and 1800, when Neapolitan was the language of the Neapolitan comic opera.

== Early career ==
Di Giacomo was born in Naples.

He studied medicine briefly, largely to satisfy his father's wishes, but gave it up to devote himself to literature. He first wrote short stories in the veristic manner (collected in 1893 in Pipa e boccale), but soon turned to poetry. He then founded a literary journal, Il Fantasio, in 1880, and, like many young writers, had a varied apprenticeship, working in a print shop, as a journalist and publishing some of his early verse in the Neapolitan daily, il Mattino. He even wrote a series of youthful stories à la E. T. A. Hoffmann and Edgar Allan Poe set in an imaginary German town inhabited by sinister students and mad doctors.

He had a lifelong love of libraries as well as literary and historical research, founding, in the course of his career, the Lucchese section of the National library in Naples and holding the position of assistant librarian at the library of the San Pietro a Maiella music conservatory. He was, with Benedetto Croce, one of the founders of the literary journal, Napoli Nobilissima. He was also an expert of the history of his land, and he published the work Per la storia del brigantaggio nel Napoletano in 1904. He received a critical boost in 1903 when Croce published a defence of dialect poetry. Di Giacomo published no anthology of his own collected poems until 1907, when he was 47 years old.

== Poems and plays ==
His numerous collections of poems – Sunette antiche (1884), 'O fùnneco verde (1886), Mattinate napoletane (1886), A San Francisco (1895), Ariette e sunette (1898) – and the longer compositions 'O munasterio (1887) and Zi' munacella (1888), paint a picture of contemporary Naples, with some characters aspiring to improve their social position and others devising different stratagems for survival in increasingly squalid conditions. However, Di Giacomo does not aim so much at social criticism as at exploring in depth the character of the city and its inhabitants. This gives his verse its intense musicality and lyricism.

Equally lyrical are the plays O' voto (1899), O' mese mariano (1900), and Assunta Spina (1909), bitter stories about turn-of-the-century life in the Naples of the Risanamento (the massive, decades-long urban renewal of the city that displaced tens of thousands of persons), workers whose health is ruined by their labors, prostitution, betrayal, prison, and crime.

Di Giacomo had antiquarian interests which intensified on his appointment as librarian in the Naples national library in 1893, and led to Taverne famose napoletane (1899) and Napoli: figure e paesi (1909). He also wrote some of the most famous Neapolitan songs, such as ‘A Marechiare’, ‘Era de maggio’, and ‘Tiempe d'ammore’, a fact that still leads some critics to dismiss him as a lightweight.

== Use of language ==
Di Giacomo seemingly viewed standard language as necessary for modern commerce and politics, but almost by definition devoid of the life that people bring to the language they speak, the vernacular turn of phrase that exists only at a particular place in a particular time for a particular people. He closed his own essay on Neapolitan poetry, written in 1900, with this passionate quote from Dante: "With the gifts God gives us from Heaven, we shall try to renew the language of the common people."

== Sources ==
This entry is an abridgement of a Salvatore Di Giacomo article on another website and has been placed here by the author and copyright owner of that article.
