= Captain Fracasse =

Captain Fracasse (French:Le capitaine Fracasse) may refer to:

- Captain Fracasse (novel), an 1863 novel by Théophile Gautier
- Captain Fracasse (1919 film), an Italian silent film
- Captain Fracasse (1929 film), a French silent film
- Captain Fracasse (1940 film), an Italian film
- Captain Fracasse (1943 film), a French-Italian film
- Captain Fracasse (1961 film), a French-Italian film

== See also ==
- Captain Fracassa's Journey (Il viaggio di Capitan Fracassa) a 1990 Italian film based on the novel Captain Fracasse
- Il Capitano alias Captain Fracassa, a stock character in the Commedia dell'arte
- The High Priestess a variant of Tarot Card trump number II called The Spanish Captain Fracasse
