= Caserini =

Caserini is a surname. Notable people with the surname include:

- Maria Caserini (1884–1969), Italian stage and film actress
- Mario Caserini (1874–1920), Italian film director, actor, and screenwriter
