= Captain Fracasse (1943 film) =

1943 film

- Directed by: Abel Gance
- Written by: Abel Gance; Claude Vermorel
- Based on: Le capitaine Fracasse by Théophile Gautier
- Produced by: Josette France; Pierre Gurgo-Salice
- Starring: Fernand Gravey; Assia Noris; Alice Tissot
- Cinematography: Nicolas Hayer
- Edited by: Lucienne Déméocq
- Music by: Arthur Honegger
- Production companies: Lux Film; Zénith Films
- Distributed by: Lux Film
- Release date: 19 June 1943
- Running time: 100 minutes
- Countries: France; Italy
- Language: French

Captain Fracasse (French: Le Capitaine Fracasse) is a 1943 French-Italian historical adventure film directed by Abel Gance and starring Fernand Gravey, Assia Noris and Alice Tissot. It is an adaptation of the novel Captain Fracasse by Théophile Gautier. The scenario and dialogue is by Abel Gance and Claude Vermorel and the music composed by Arthur Honegger. Honegger's score for the film (H. 166 in his catalogue of works) consists of around 50 minutes of music for chorus and large orchestra.

On the same subject, there were also a 1929 silent version directed by Alberto Cavalcanti, and a 1961 colour version directed by Pierre Gaspard-Huit both with the same title.

== Cast ==
- Fernand Gravey as the Baron de Sigognac (later Capitaine Fracasse)
- Assia Noris as Isabelle
- Jean Weber as the Duc de Vallombreuse
- Alice Tissot as Dame Léonarde
- Vina Bovy as Séraphine
- Maurice Escande as the Marquis de Bruyères
- Roland Toutain as Scapin
- Lucien Nat as Agostin
- Mona Goya as the Marquise de Bruyères
- Paul Œttly as Matamore
- Jacques François as the Chevalier de Vidalenc, friend of Vallombreuse
- Mary Lou as Yolande de Foix
- Jean Fleur as Blazius
- Nino Costantini as Léandre
- Josette France as Zerbine
- Roger Blin as Fagotin
- Paul Mondollot as Pierre

== Plot ==
Set in the mid 17th century, the young Baron de Sigognac lives alone, ruined, in his castle. A troupe of travelling players stop in the castle ward and are offered hospitality by Sigognac, who remarks the beauty of the actress Isabelle. He decides to follow the troupe on their journeys.

The old leader of the troupe, Matamore dies and Sigognac replaces him using the pseudonym Capitaine Fracasse. He is enthusiastically received but has a rival for the attentions of Isabelle in the Duc de Vallombreuse. They fight a duel in a cemetery in Poitiers.

Afterwards, Vallombreuse manages to abduct Isabelle and imprison her in his castle. Sigognac-Fracasse comes to the rescue and another duel ensues. Then it is revealed that Isabelle is in fact the rich descendant and the sister of Vallombreuse. Sigognac finally marries her.
