= Baron de Sigognac =

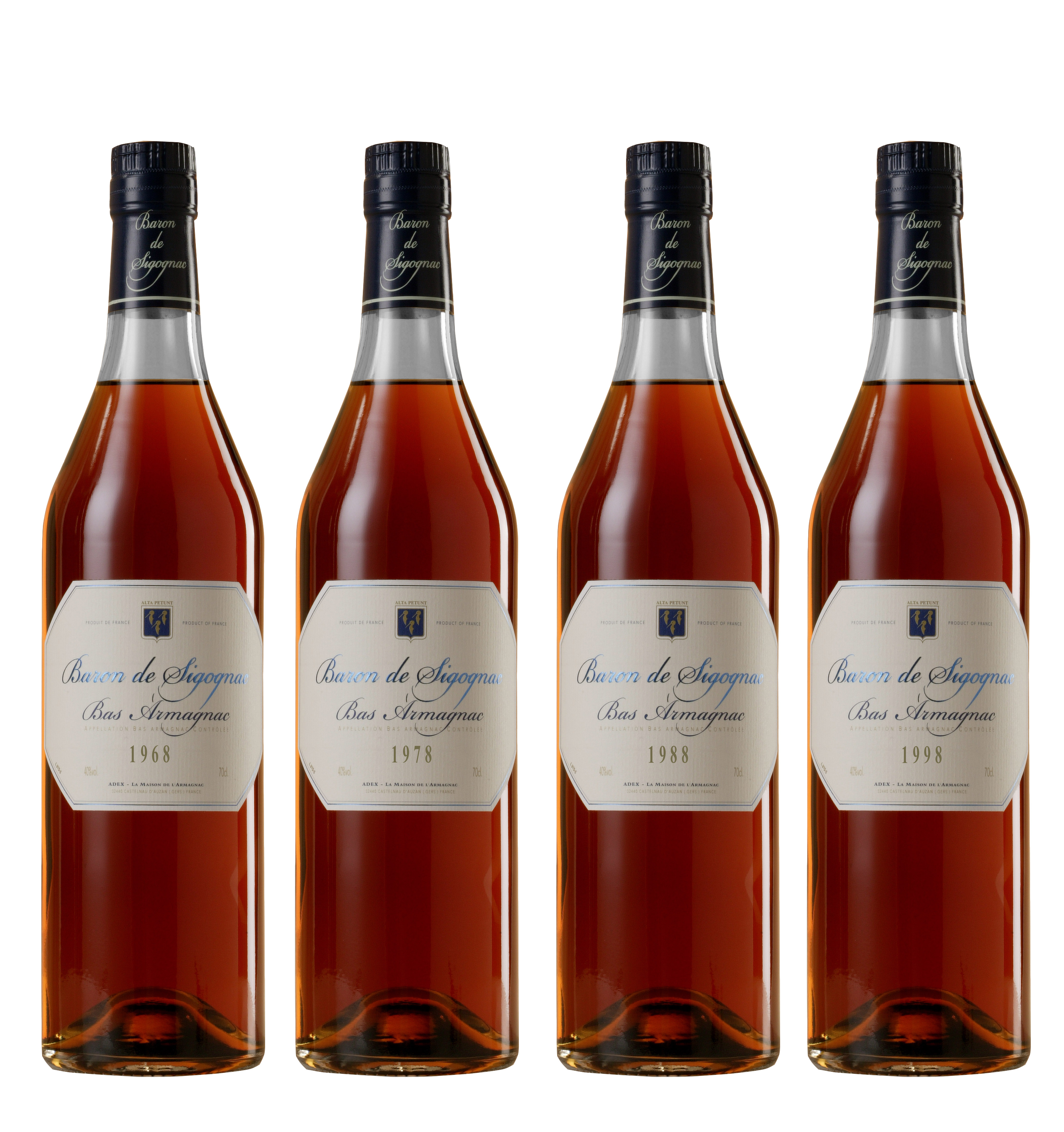
The Baron de Sigognac Vintage Family

Baron de Sigognac is an Armagnac brand produced by the Domaine de Bordeneuve company.

The Baron de Sigognac is the protagonist Capitaine Fracasse in Théophile Gautier's 1863 novel Captain Fracasse.
