= Beatrice Cenci (1909 film) =

1909 silent Italian film by Mario Caserini

- Directed by: Mario Caserini
- Written by: Mario Caserini
- Starring: Maria Caserini; Renato De Grais; Fernanda Negri Pouget
- Production company: Società Italiana Cines
- Distributed by: Società Italiana Cines
- Release date: October 1909
- Country: Italy
- Languages: Silent; Italian intertitles

Beatrice Cenci is a 1909 Italian silent historical film directed by Mario Caserini and starring Maria Caserini, Renato De Grais and Fernanda Negri Pouget. It is one of several films portraying the story of the sixteenth century Italian noblewoman Beatrice Cenci.

== Cast ==
- Maria Caserini as Beatrice Cenci
- Renato De Grais
- Fernanda Negri Pouget
- Ettore Pesci
- Alessandro Rinaldi

== Bibliography ==
- Waters, Sandra. Narrating the Italian Historical Novel. ProQuest, 2009.
