= Caranta =

Caranta is a surname. Notable people with the surname include:

- Jules Caranta (born 2008), French racing driver
- Mauricio Caranta (born 1978), Argentine football player and manager

== See also ==
- Quaranta, a surname
