= Ugo Farulli =

Italian stage director, playwright and actor (1869–1928)

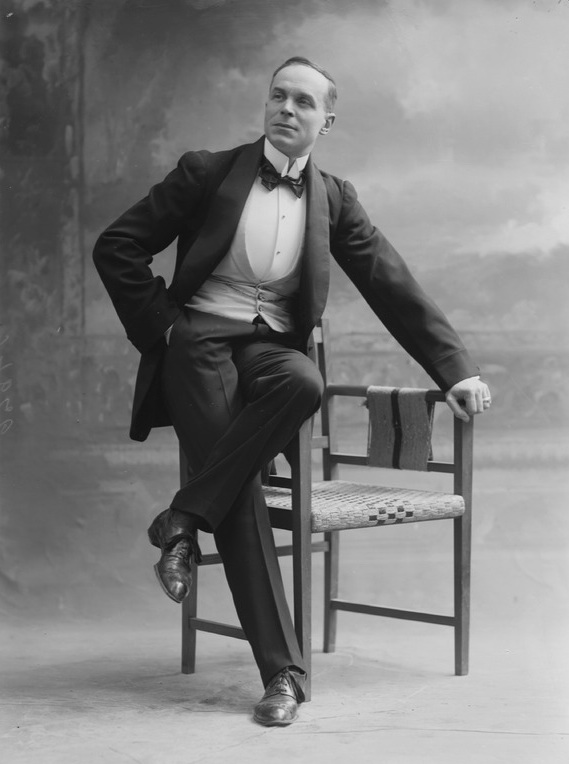
- Born: April 4, 1869; Florence
- Died: November 1928 (aged 59)
- Occupations: theater director, playwright, actor

Ugo Farulli (April 4, 1869, Florence – November 1928, Rome) was an Italian theater director, playwright, and actor.

== Biography ==
Ugo Farulli was born in Florence on April 4, 1869. He began his career as an actor in amateur theater companies in Florence. Subsequently, starting from 1901, he worked as a supporting actor in troupe of Talli-Gramatica-Calabresi, Alfredo De Sanctis' troupe, and Andrea Maggi's troupe. In 1909, he joined the stable troupe of Teatro Argentina, where he achieved his first successes as an actor. Farulli made his debut as a playwright in 1911 with Le signorine della villa accanto, which became successful and was later adapted for the big screen in the film of the same name. In 1913, he returned to Teatro Argentina, this time not only as an actor but also as a theater director. In 1916, he formed a troupe with Dante Cappelli and starred in the comedic film Farulli si arruola. The following year, he began a long collaboration with actor Nando Leonelli. After the war, between 1919 and 1921, he settled in Naples with his troupe, renamed Stabile del Teatro Sannazzaro, and achieved critical and public success. In 1921, he fell ill and had to hand over the reins of the troupe to Leonelli. He resumed his activity a few years later, forming a troupe with Marga Cella and later working as a simple actor in the Celli-De Cristoforo troupe and Annibale Ninchi's troupe. Ugo Farulli died in Rome in November 1928; after only ten months his wife Adele Accansi, a theater and film actress, also ceased to live.
