= Der Weg ins Freie =

The Road into the Open
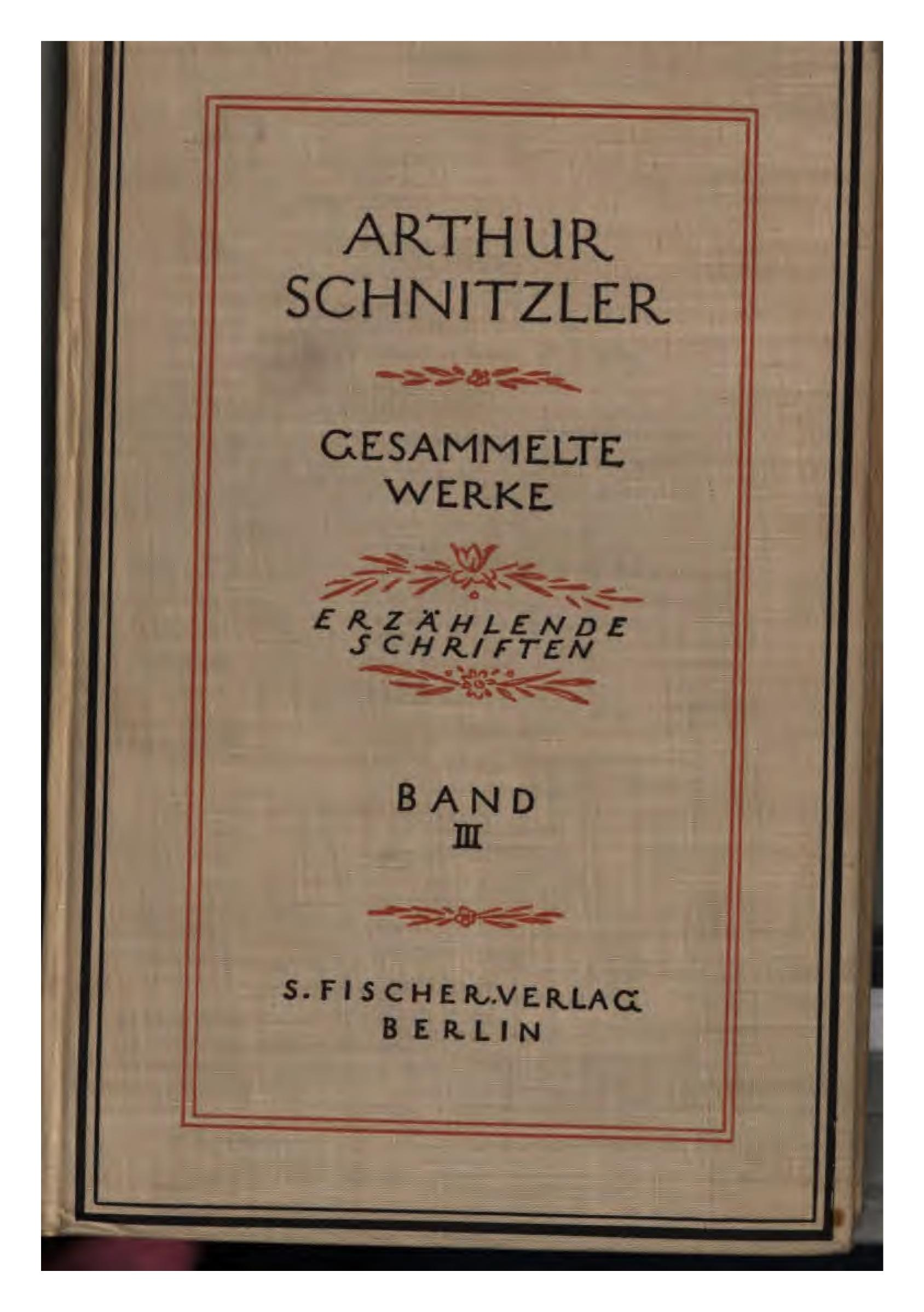
- Collected Works Section 1 Third Volume The Way Out
- Author: Arthur Schnitzler
- Original title: Der Weg ins Freie
- Translator: Roger Byers
- Language: German
- Genre: Novel
- Publication date: 1908
- Publication place: Austria
- Media type: Print (hardback & paperback)
- Pages: 297

Der Weg ins Freie (translated as The Way into the Open and most often The Road into the Open) was published by Arthur Schnitzler in 1908 and is one of only two novels (the other being Therese) by this Viennese author (1862-1931) better known for his short stories and plays. This novel was first translated into English in 1913 by Horace Barnett Samuel (1883-1950).

== Plot ==
The principal character of Der Weg ins Freie is the aristocratic young composer Georg von Wergenthin-Recco who has talent but lacks the drive to get down to work, and spends most of his time socializing with members of the assimilationist, artistically sensitive Jewish bourgeoisie of Vienna and other non-Jews like himself who enjoy their company.

The plot centers on his ultimately unhappy affair with a Catholic lower middle class girl named Anna Rosner. The novel's reputation rests not on the story of this affair, however, but Schnitzler's brilliant description – based on first-hand acquaintance – of the milieu he describes and the topics that interest it, including the arts, the psychology of love, and the anti-semitism that was coming to dominate so much of life and politics in Austria-Hungary at the time.
