= Quaranta =

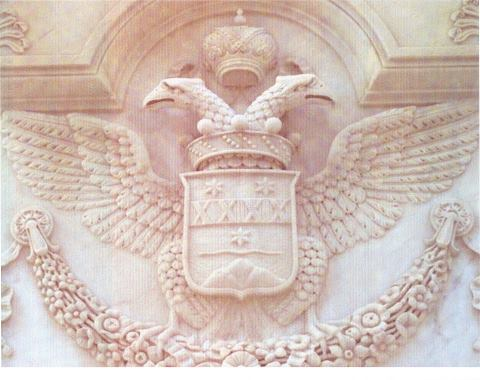
Quaranta coat of arms

Quaranta (forty in Italian) is an ancient and noble Italian family, with its origin in Scandinavia, established at the end of the 11th century in the district of Salerno. This surname now has roots that spread all over the world. When researching the Quaranta name, several different variations of the name can be found. Language changes and carelessness contributed to this. Additionally, high instances of illiteracy contributed to the numbers of ways a name may have been spelled and articulated. Many times a town clerk would spell names the way they sounded. Because of this, surname dictionaries list such spelling variations as Quarantelli, Quaranti, Quatanto, Quarantas, Quartarara, Quaranto, and Quartararo which all stem from the root surname Quaranta.

The first evidence of this family's existence in America is verified by the "Italians in America", which notes that Salvatore and Commaso Quaranta arrived in New York on December 14, 1880, aboard the "Italia", which sailed from Marseilles, Naples, and Palermo. There is a possibility, however, that the name Quaranta could have been introduced in America at an earlier date.

== History ==
The Founder of the Quaranta family was a medieval Norman knight who returned from the Crusades in the 11th century during the government of Guaimar IV of Salerno. He led forty pilgrims from the Holy Land and dislodged the Saracens (Muslims) from the sieged city Salerno. Therefore, he was nicknamed “dei Quaranta” (of the forty). For such merit Knight Quaranta was rewarded with an immense property between Salerno and Cava de'Tirreni, where the family settled and where the family established the Church of the SS Quaranta Martiri (the holy Forty Martyrs), what made the family the most prestigious family in the region. On their property, in the Norman era, the tremendous Quaranta palace was built.

With the arrival of the Angioina (Angevin) dynasty several members of the family moved to Naples where they became eminent members of The Neapolitan parliament, as representatives of the city districts (seggi) Forcella and Porto (port). The family prospered in the following centuries and has spread out to all parts of Italy.

== Notable people with the surname Quaranta ==
- Annamaria Quaranta (born 1981) - Italian volleyball player
- Danilo Quaranta (born 1997) - Italian football player
- Gianni Quaranta (1943–2025) - Italian production designer and art director
- Ivan Quaranta (born 1974) - Italian international cyclist
- Letizia Quaranta (1892–1977) - Italian actress
- Lidia Quaranta (1891–1928) - Italian actress
- Santino Quaranta (born 1984) - American soccer player
- Stefano Quaranta (died 1678) - Roman Catholic prelate who served as Archbishop of Amalfi

== Bibliography ==
=== Primary sources ===
- Genealogies of Italian noble families
- Personalized Quaranta family host site

=== Extras ===
- Prominent members of the Quaranta family
- In depth look at important Quaranta family members
