= Arthur Schnitzler =

Austrian author and dramatist (1862–1931)

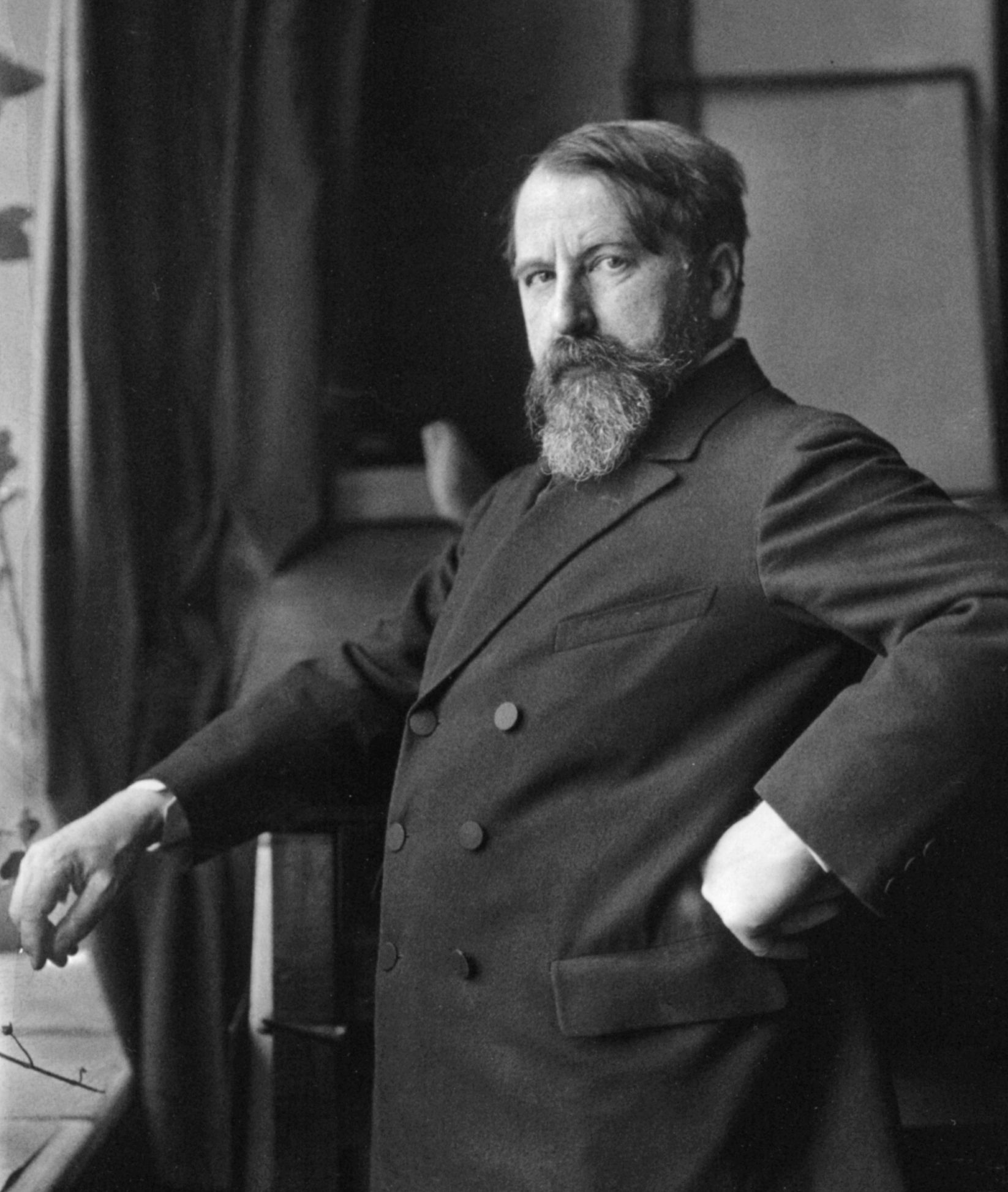
- Arthur Schnitzler, c. 1912
- Born: 15 May 1862; Vienna, Austrian Empire
- Died: 21 October 1931 (aged 69); Vienna, Austria
- Writing career
- Language: German
- Genres: Short stories, novels, plays
- Notable works: Liebelei, Reigen, Fräulein Else, Professor Bernhardi
- Movements: Decadent movement, Viennese Modernism

Arthur Schnitzler (German: [ˈʃnɪtslɐ]; 15 May 1862 – 21 October 1931) was an Austrian author and dramatist. He is considered one of the most significant representatives of Viennese Modernism. Schnitzler's works, which include psychological dramas and narratives, dissected turn-of-the-century Viennese bourgeois life, making him a sharp and stylistically conscious chronicler of Viennese society around 1900. Schnitzler's Jewish upbringing and the sexual content of his works made them controversial or banned in his time and beyond.

== Life ==
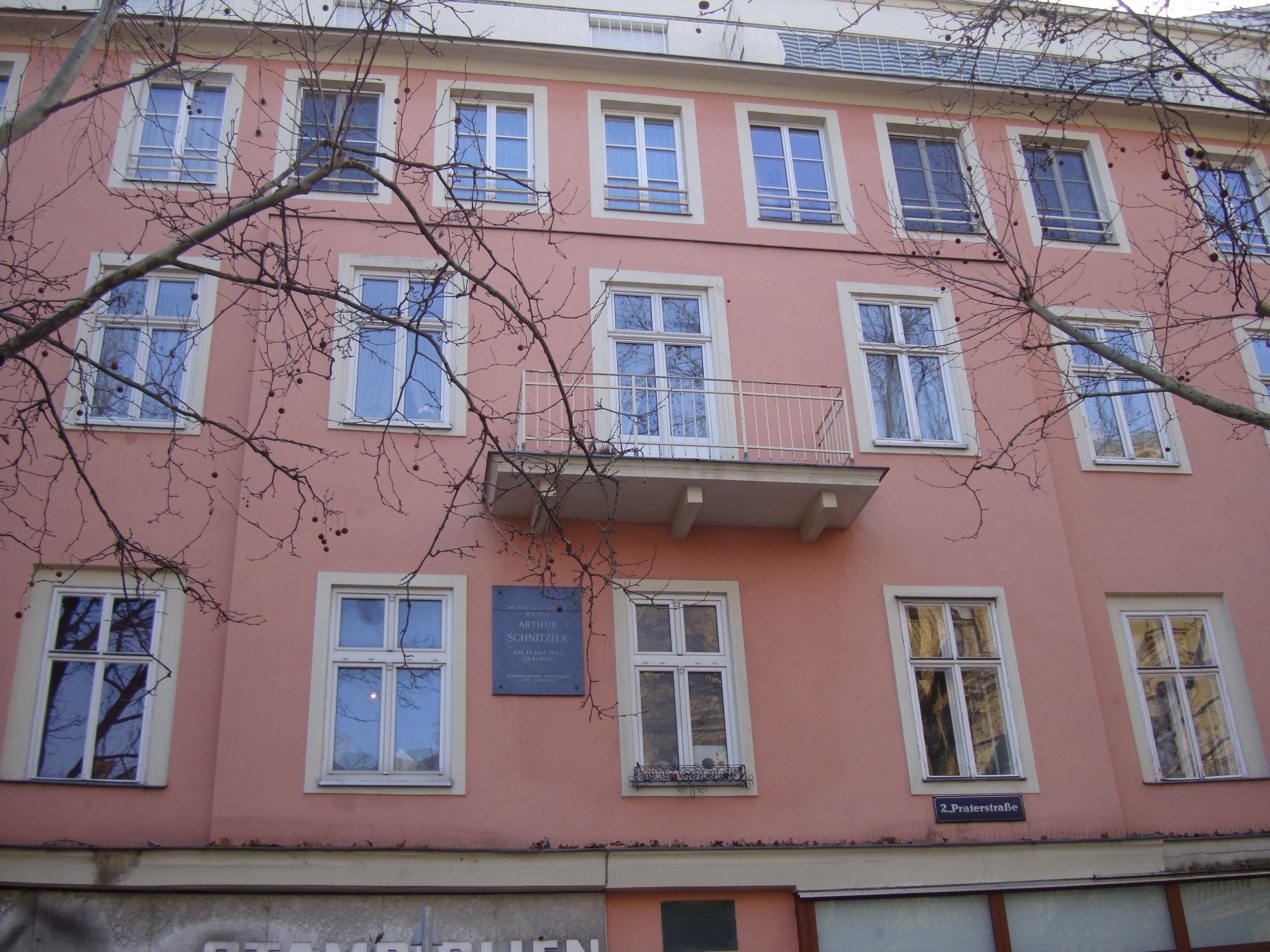
Schnitzler's birthplace Praterstrasse 16

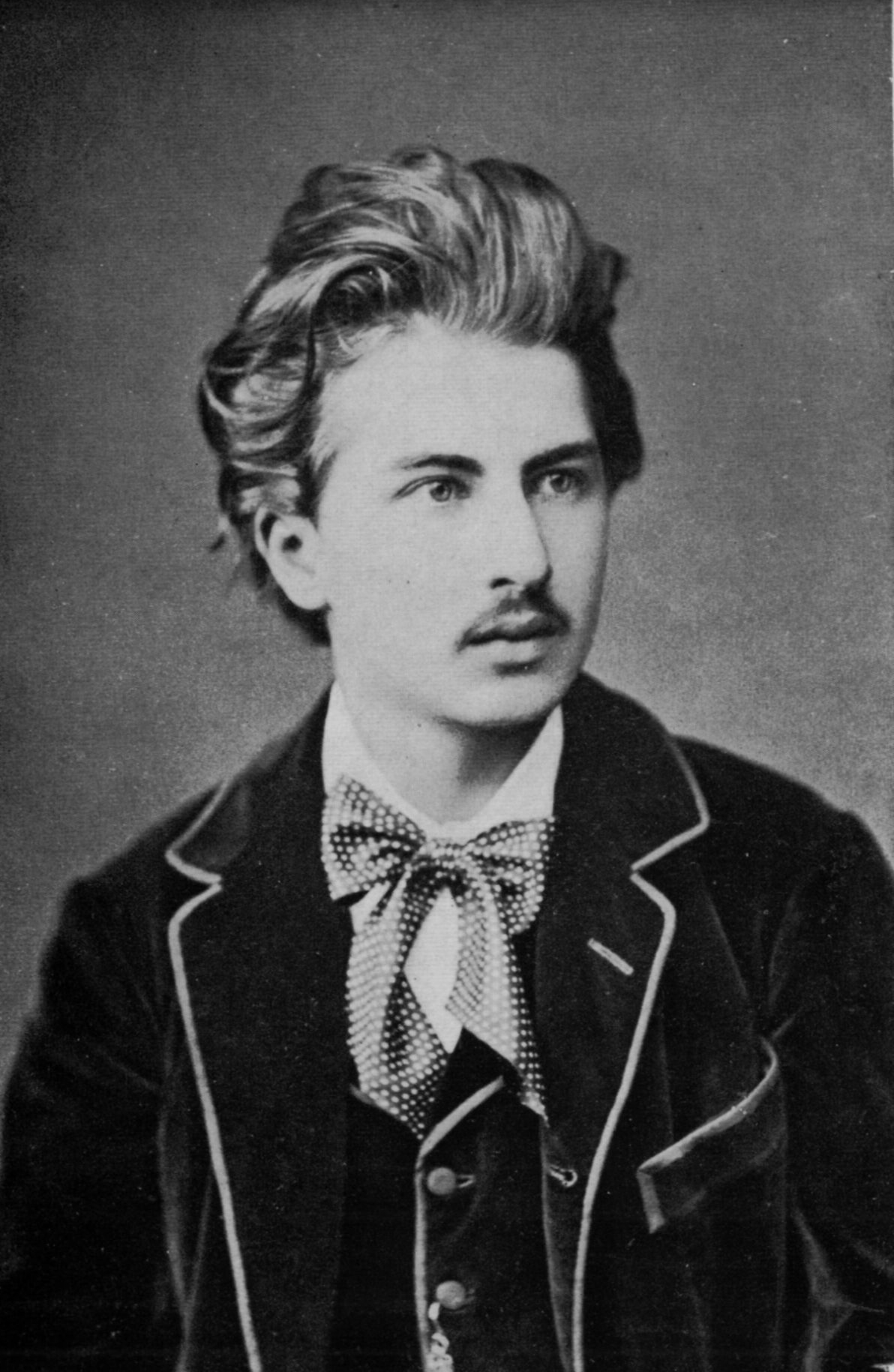
Schnitzler in 1878

Arthur Schnitzler was born at Praterstrasse 16, Leopoldstadt, Vienna, capital of the Austrian Empire (as of 1867, part of the dual monarchy of Austria-Hungary). He was the son of a prominent Hungarian laryngologist, Johann Schnitzler (1835–1893), and Luise Markbreiter (1838–1911), a daughter of the Viennese doctor Philipp Markbreiter. His parents were from Jewish families. In 1879 Schnitzler began studying medicine at the University of Vienna and in 1885 he received his doctorate of medicine. He began work at Vienna's General Hospital (German: Allgemeines Krankenhaus der Stadt Wien), but ultimately abandoned the practice of medicine in favour of writing.

On 26 August 1903, Schnitzler married Olga Gussmann (1882–1970), a 21-year-old aspiring actress and singer who came from a Jewish middle-class family. They had a son, Heinrich (1902–1982), born on 9 August 1902. In 1909 they had a daughter, Lili, who committed suicide in 1928. The Schnitzlers separated in 1921. Schnitzler died on 21 October 1931 in Vienna of a brain haemorrhage. In 1938, following the Anschluss, his son Heinrich went to the United States and did not return to Austria until 1959; he is the father of the Austrian musician and conservationist Michael Schnitzler, born in 1944 in Berkeley, California, who moved to Vienna with his parents in 1959.

== Literary works ==
Schnitzler's works were often controversial, both for their frank description of sexuality (in a letter to Schnitzler Sigmund Freud confessed "I have gained the impression that you have learned through intuition – although actually as a result of sensitive introspection – everything that I have had to unearth by laborious work on other persons") and for their strong stand against antisemitism, represented by works such as his play Professor Bernhardi and his novel Der Weg ins Freie. However, although Schnitzler was Jewish, Professor Bernhardi and Fräulein Else are among the few clearly identified Jewish protagonists in his work.

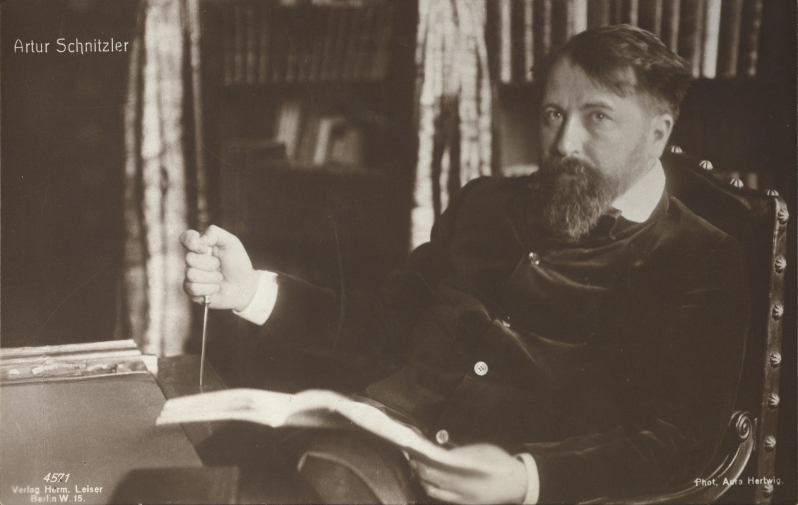
Schnitzler in 1906

Schnitzler was branded as a pornographer after the release of his play Reigen, in which 10 pairs of characters are shown before and after the sexual act, leading and ending with a prostitute. The furor this play aroused was often couched in antisemitic terms. Reigen was made into a French language film in 1950 by the German-born director Max Ophüls as La Ronde. The film achieved considerable success in the English-speaking world, with the result that Schnitzler's play is better known there under its French title. Richard Oswald's film The Merry-Go-Round (1920), Roger Vadim's Circle of Love (1964) and Otto Schenk's Der Reigen (1973) also are based on the play. A more recent adaptation is the Fernando Meirelles' film 360.

In the novella Fräulein Else (1924) Schnitzler may be rebutting a contentious critique of the Jewish character by Otto Weininger (1903) by positioning the sexuality of the young female Jewish protagonist. The story, a first-person stream of consciousness narrative by a young aristocratic woman, reveals a moral dilemma that ends in tragedy.

In response to an interviewer who asked Schnitzler what he thought about the critical view that his works all seemed to treat the same subjects, he replied "I write of love and death. What other subjects are there?" Despite his seriousness of purpose, Schnitzler frequently approaches the bedroom farce in his plays. Professor Bernhardi, a play about a Jewish doctor who turns away a Catholic priest in order to spare his patient the realization that she is on the point of death, is his only major dramatic work without a sexual theme.

A member of the avant-garde group Young Vienna (Jung-Wien), Schnitzler toyed with formal as well as social conventions. With his 1900 novella Lieutenant Gustl, he was the first to write German fiction in stream-of-consciousness narration. The story is an unflattering portrait of its protagonist and of the army's obsessive code of formal honor. It cost Schnitzler his commission as a reserve officer in the medical corps.

He specialized in shorter works like novellas and one-act plays. In his short stories like "The Green Tie" ("Die grüne Krawatte") he showed himself to be one of the early masters of microfiction. However he also wrote two full-length novels: Der Weg ins Freie about a talented but unmotivated young composer, and the artistically less satisfactory Therese.

In addition to his plays and fiction, Schnitzler meticulously kept a diary from the age of 17 until two days before his death. The manuscript, which runs to almost 8,000 pages, is most notable for Schnitzler's casual descriptions of sexual engagements; he was often in relationships with several women at once and for a period of some years he kept a record of every orgasm. The diaries were published between 1981 and 2000 in ten volumes by the Austrian Academy of Sciences and have been available in digital form since 2019.

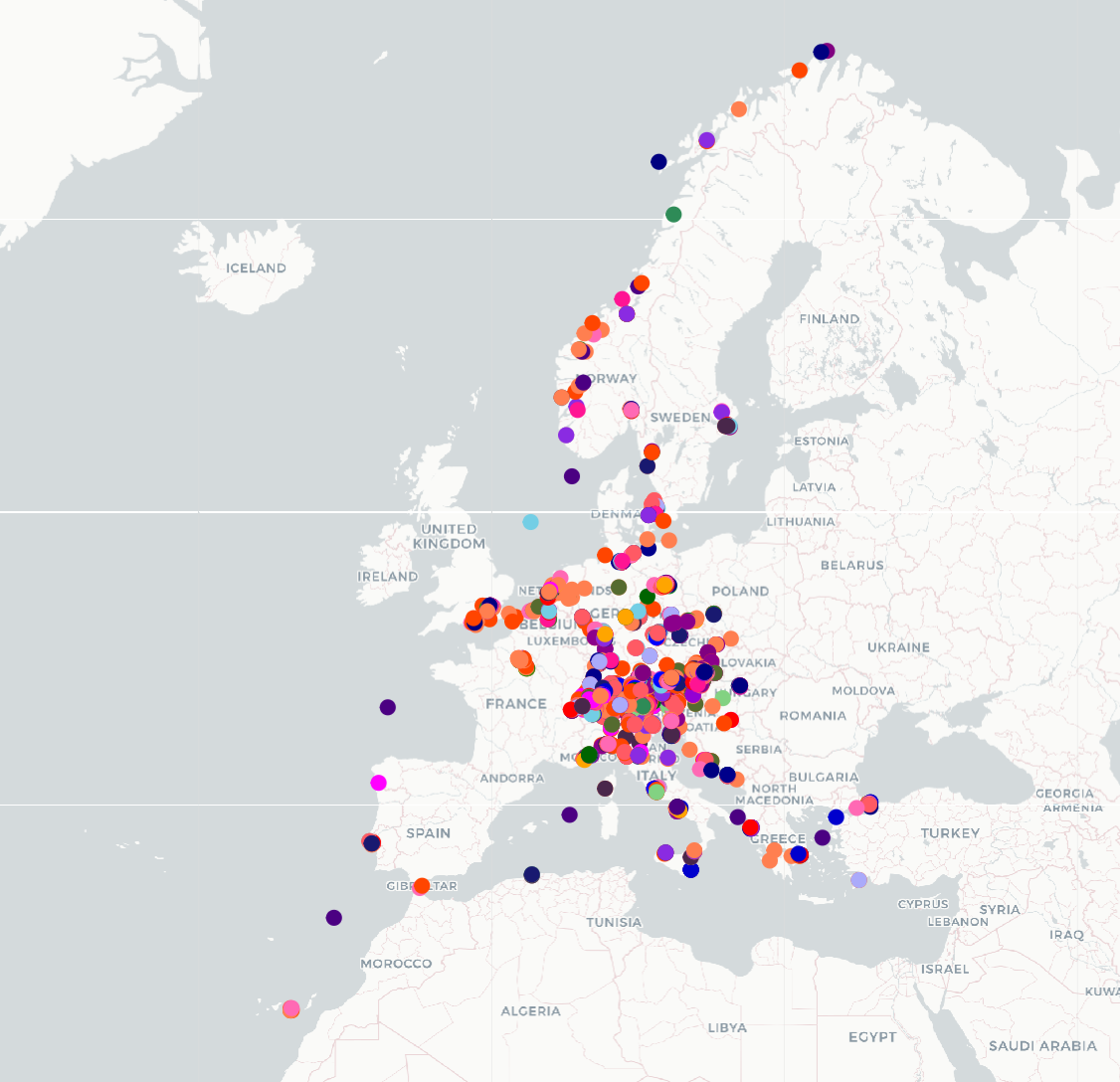
Places Arthur Schnitzler visited in his life

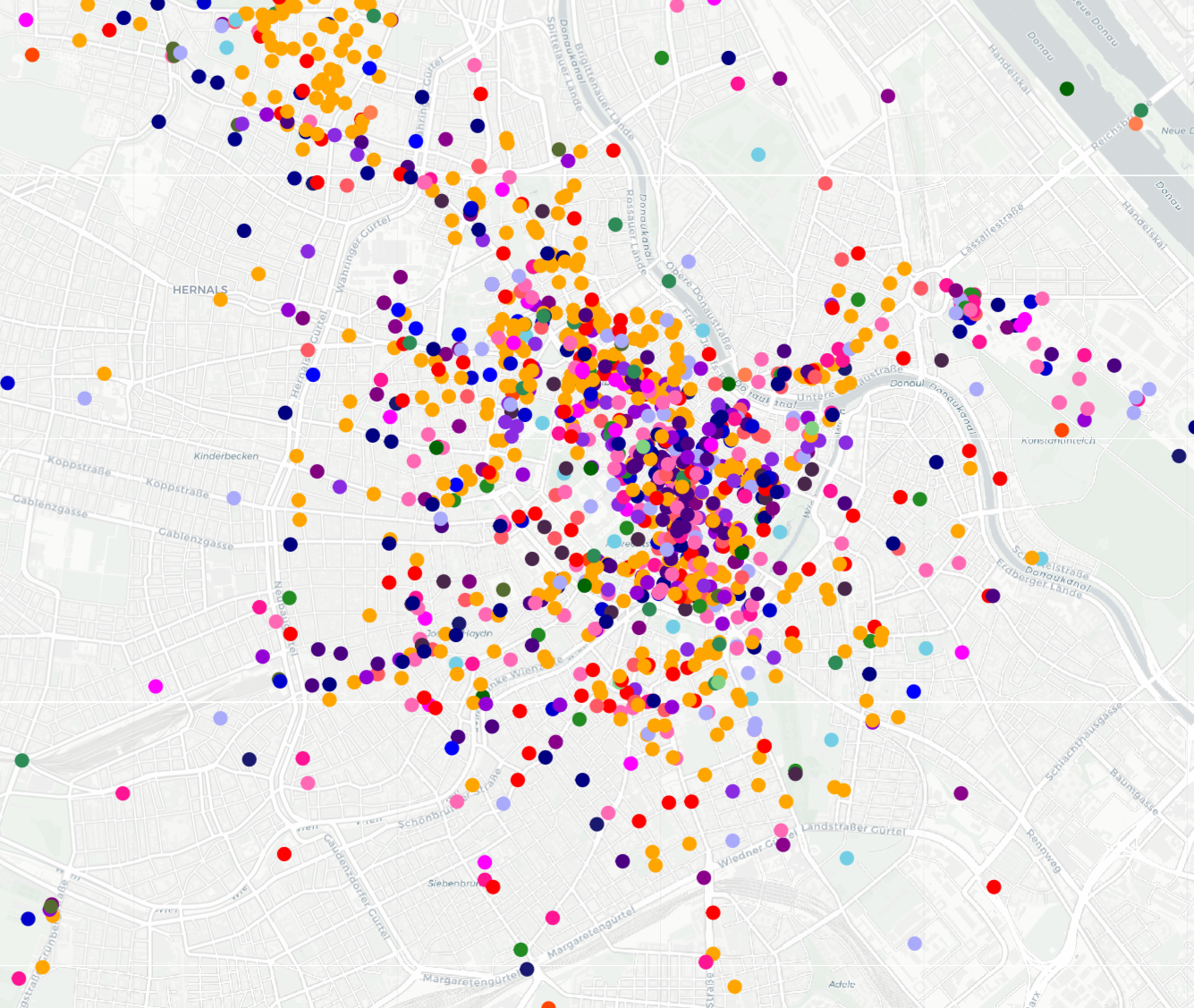
Detail with the places he frequented in his hometown Vienna

Collections of Schnitzler's letters also have been published. The major correspondences with Hugo von Hofmannsthal, Hermann Bahr, Sigmund Freud, Otto Brahm, and Richard Beer-Hofmann have appeared in print, along with two extensive volumes presenting a representative selection of his letters. Since 2018, the Austrian Academy of Sciences has been preparing a scholarly edition of Schnitzler's correspondence with fellow writers, comprising more than fifty complete exchanges and over 4,000 letters to date. Because Schnitzler's life is exceptionally well documented through autobiographical sources, a database listing more than 47,000 recorded stays at nearly 5,000 locations was published online in 2025. It is currently considered the most comprehensive freely accessible record of the places associated with any historical individual worldwide.

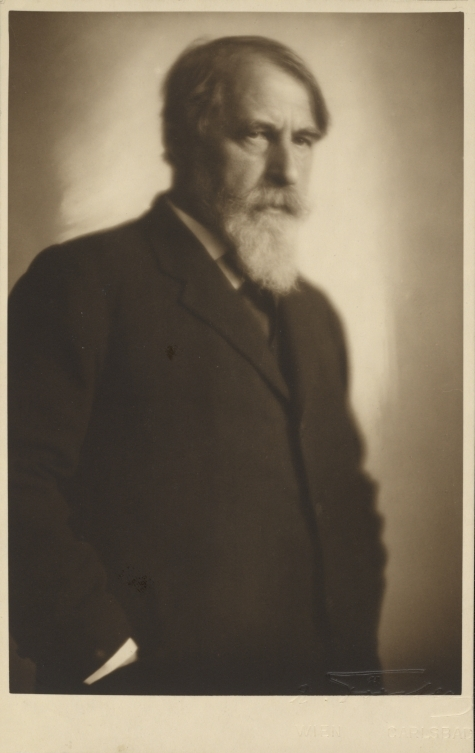
Schnitzler in 1926

Schnitzler's works were called "Jewish filth" by Adolf Hitler and were banned by the Nazis in Austria and Germany. In 1933, when Joseph Goebbels organized book burnings in Berlin and other cities, Schnitzler's works were thrown into flames along with those of other Jews, including Einstein, Marx, Kafka, Freud and Stefan Zweig.

His novella Fräulein Else has been adapted a number of times, including the German silent film Fräulein Else (1929), starring Elisabeth Bergner, and the 1946 Argentine film The Naked Angel, starring Olga Zubarry.

In 1973, five of Schnitzler's short stories were adapted as the BBC television series "Vienna 1900".

== Archive ==
The majority of Schnitzler's archive, which consists of 40,000 pages worth of documents, was saved from the Nazis by a British man, Eric A. Blackall. Acting at the behest of Schnitzler's widow Olga (actually his ex-wife), Blackall arranged for the documents to be secretly transported to Cambridge University under a diplomatic seal. After the war, this created a difficult legal situation, as Schnitzler's ex-wife, Olga did not have the legal right to donate the documents. In fact, Schnitzler had bequeathed them to his son, Heinrich, who was not in Vienna at the time. During the Second World War and afterwards, Heinrich Schnitzler tried and failed to get the documents returned. Thomas Trenkler wrote in the newspaper Kurier that the acquisition of the documents by the British was not legitimate and that the documents should be handed to Schnitzler's remaining family in 2015. Schnitzler's grandsons, Michael and Peter, announced that they indeed wanted the documents handed over to them.

== Selected works ==
=== Plays ===
- Anatol (1893), a series of seven acts revolving around a bourgeois playboy and his immature relationships.
- Flirtation (Liebelei – 1895), also known as The Reckoning, which was made into a film by Max Ophüls in 1933, and Pierre Gaspard-Huit in 1958 (Christine), and also adapted as Dalliance by Tom Stoppard (1986) and Sweet Nothings by David Harrower for the Young Vic in 2010.
- Fair Game (Freiwild – 1896)
- Light-'O-Love (1896)
- Reigen (1897), more usually called La Ronde is still frequently presented. Max Ophüls directed the first movie adaptation of the play in 1950; Roger Vadim directed a second version in 1964, and Otto Schenk a third version in 1973. In 1998, it was reworked by British playwright David Hare as The Blue Room. It was also adapted by theatrical composer Michael John LaChiusa into an Off-Broadway musical called Hello Again in 1994. Suzanne Bachner did a modern adaptation called "Circle" about 21st-century sexual mores in 2002. Austrian composer Bernhard Lang wrote an opera, Der Reigen, in 2012; it premiered in 2014 at the Schwetzingen Festival.
- Die Gefährtin (1899)
- Paracelsus (1899)
- The Green Cockatoo (Der grüne Kakadu – 1899). In 1954–1956, composer Richard Mohaupt adapted the play into the one-act opera Der grüne Kakadu, which premiered at the Hamburg State Opera on 16 September 1958.
- Literature (1901), a one-act black comedy about a woman and her former lover, a bohemian writer. The former has incorporated her letters to the latter in an unpublished manuscript, not realizing that he has incoporated their correspendence in his latest novel. The woman realizes that if she publishes her novel, her boorish, nobly born fiancé will find out the truth about her relationship with her former lover.
- The Lonely Way (Der einsame Weg – 1904)
- Intermezzo (Zwischenspiel – 1904)
- Der Ruf des Lebens (1906)
- Countess Mizzi or the Family Reunion (Komtesse Mizzi oder Der Familientag – 1907)
- Living Hours (1911)
- Young Medardus (Der junge Medardus – 1910)
- The Vast Domain (Das weite Land – 1911). The play was adapted as Undiscovered Country by Tom Stoppard (1979). Three film versions of this play have been made, the first by Ernst Lothar in 1960 with Attila Hörbiger as Hofreiter, the second by Peter Beauvais in 1970 with O. W. Fischer, the third one (The Distant Land) in 1986 by Luc Bondy, starring Michel Piccoli.
- Professor Bernhardi (1912)
- The Comedy of Seduction (Komödie der Verführung – 1924)
- Comedies of Words and Other Plays (1917)

=== Novels ===
- The Road into the Open (Der Weg ins Freie – 1908)
- Therese. Chronik eines Frauenlebens (1928)

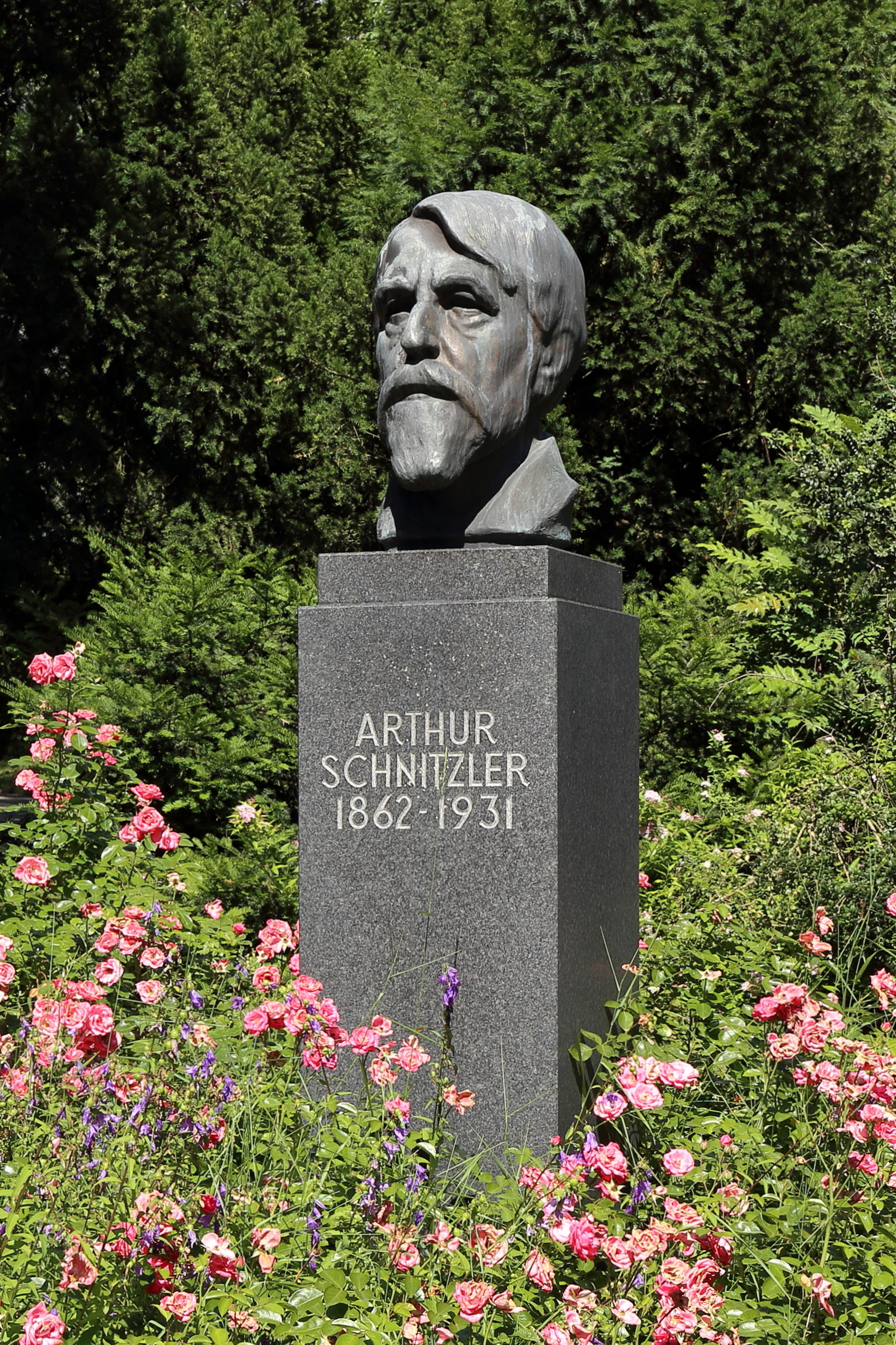
Memorial in Vienna

=== Short stories and novellas ===
- Dying (Sterben – 1895)
- None but the Brave (Leutnant Gustl – 1900)
- Berta Garlan (1900)
- Blind Geronimo and his Brother (Der blinde Geronimo und sein Bruder – 1902)
- The Prophecy (Die Weissagung – 1905)
- Casanova's Homecoming (Casanovas Heimfahrt – 1918)
- Fräulein Else (1924)
- Rhapsody – also published as Dream Story (Traumnovelle – 1925/26), later adapted as the film Eyes Wide Shut by American director Stanley Kubrick
- Night Games (Spiel im Morgengrauen – 1926) (made into American film in 1931 as Daybreak by Jacques Feyder
- Flight into Darkness (Flucht in die Finsternis – 1931)
- The Death of a Bachelor (Der Tod des Junggesellen – 1917)
- Late Fame (2014, written c.1894-1895), later adapted as a film of the same name by American director Kent Jones (2025) with Willem Dafoe as the poet.

=== Nonfiction ===
- My Youth in Vienna (Jugend in Wien), an autobiography published posthumously in 1968
- Diary, 1879–1931

== See also ==
- List of Austrian writers
