= Vina Bovy =

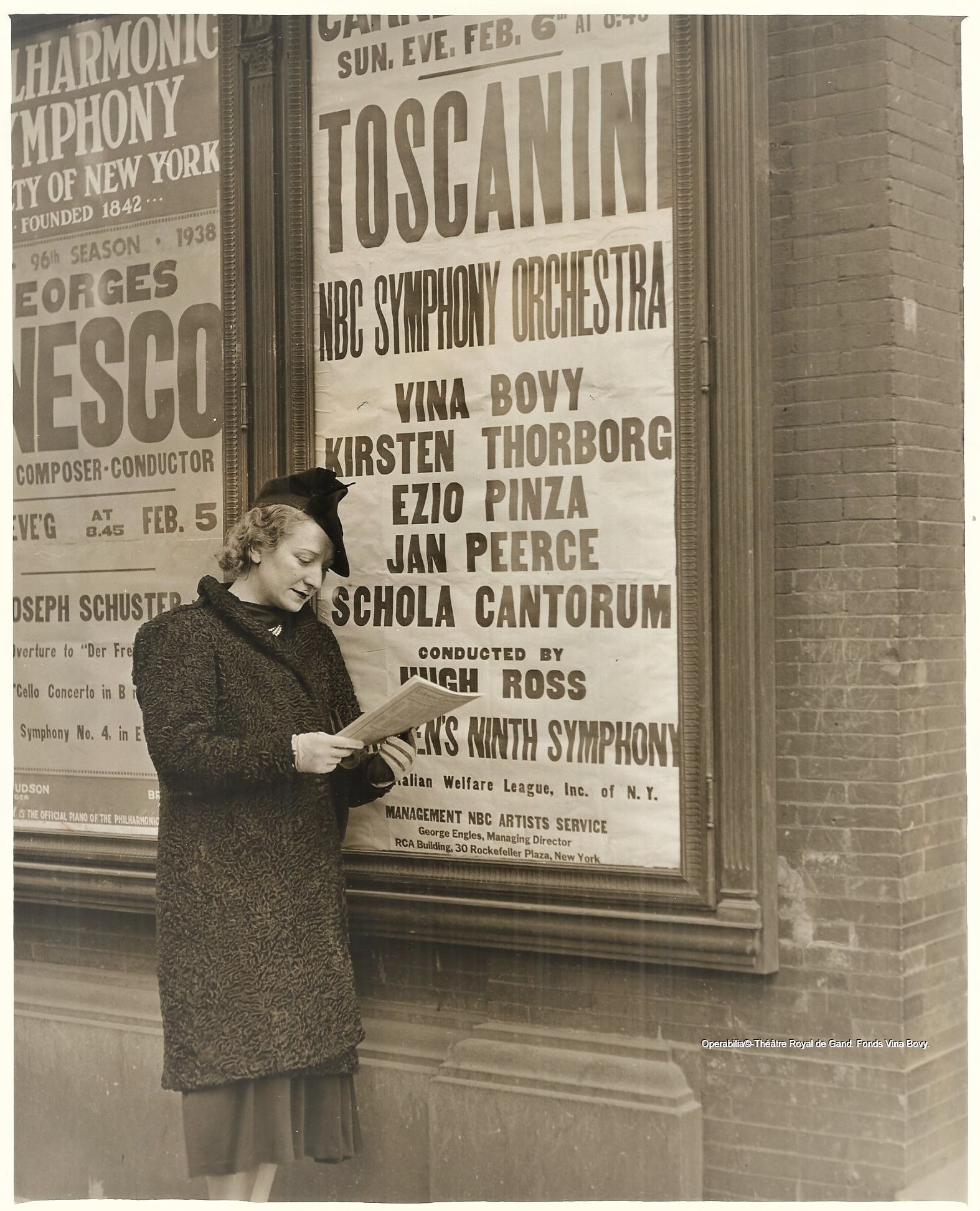
Bovy at Carnegie Hall, New York in 1938

Vina Bovy (Malvina Bovi Van Overberghe) born in Ghent on 22 May 1900, died in the same city on 16 May 1983 was a Belgian operatic soprano.

She studied in the Conservatoire in Ghent under Willemot, and first appeared on stage aged 17 as Argentine in Les deux billets (Poise). Her debut at the Théâtre Royal de la Monnaie was on 4 October 1920 as Marguerite in Gounod's Faust. At the Monnaie, she went on to sing Dorabella in Così fan tutte, Micaela in Carmen, Sophie in Werther, Parassia in Sorochintsy Fair, and Princesse Aurore in Le songe d'une nuit d'hiver.

After establishing herself at the Monnaie, she undertook engagements around France and Belgium, leading to her debut at the Opéra-Comique on 9 March 1925 (Manon). She quickly became one of the leading sopranos in the French capital, singing Lakmé, Mimi in La bohème, Mireille, Rosina in The Barber of Seville, the three soprano roles in The Tales of Hoffmann, Leila in The Pearl Fishers, Alexina in Le roi malgré lui and Violetta in La traviata. She created the role of Myriem in La nuit embaumée by Hirschmann. With Luis Mariano, Bovy appeared in Don Pasquale by Donizetti in 1944.

Noticed by Toscanini, she went on to sing the Italian repertoire at La Scala Milan, but she made her debut in Italian at the Colon in Buenos Aires. She never sang at La Scala. This led to her international career, with invitations from the Teatro Colón, Liceu, Madrid, Monte-Carlo, Rome. At the Paris Opéra, she sang from 1935 to 1947, including Gilda, Juliette, Lucia di Lammermoor, Marguerite, Thais and Princess Shemakhan (The Golden Cockerel). She sang in Beethoven's 9th symphony under Toscanini in 1938 in New York, during a period (1936–38) when she also appeared at the Metropolitan Opera. A broadcast on 23 January 1937 of Offenbach's Les contes d'Hoffmann with Bovy in the soprano roles has been issued on CD; she also sang Giulietta on the 1948 Opéra-Comique recording. In the 1930s, she also recorded excerpts from La traviata and Rigoletto with Georges Thill.

Bovy played Séraphine in the 1943 Abel Gance film Le Capitaine Fracasse (after Théophile Gautier), in which she both sings and acts.

Bovy was the director of the Koninklijke Opera Gent from 1947 to 1955, where she sang the title role in L'aiglon and Katiusha in Risurrezione.

With a fine coloratura, Bovy had a well-trained voice and was typically French in sound.
