= Domaine de Bordeneuve =

The Domaine de Bordeneuve is a French company, producing premium Armagnac brandy. The entire range of natural, craft Armagnacs is commercialised by Bordeneuve Châteaux & Collections

== Presentation ==
This family company, owned by the Guasch family, produces high quality Armagnacs such as Château de Bordeneuve or Baron de Sigognac.

Characteristics:

- located on the best cru of the appellation: Bas Armagnac area
- 100% dedicated to the Armagnac production
- a part of the cellar is from the 13th century, another one is from the 18th

This domain's vines are Ugni Blanc & Baco varietals; perfect grapes for the local soils of the Bas Armagnac region.

www.chateau-bordeneuve.com
