= Lidia Quaranta =

Italian actress (1891–1928)

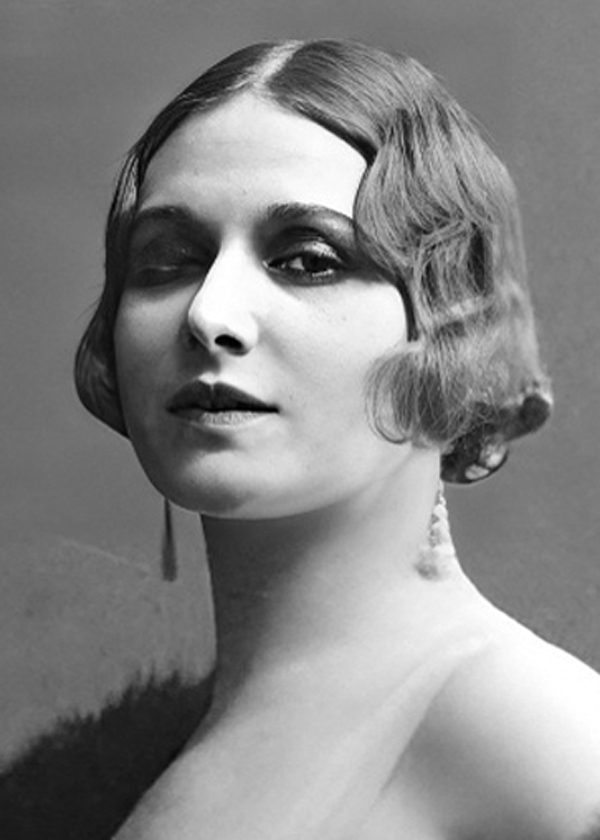
- Lidia Quaranta in a portrait by Ercole Massaglia
- Born: Lidia Gemma Mattia Quaranta; 6 March 1891; Turin, Kingdom of Italy
- Died: 5 March 1928 (aged 36); Turin, Italy
- Other name: Lydia Quaranta
- Occupation: Actress
- Years active: 1910–1925
- Relatives: Isabella Quaranta (sister); Letizia Quaranta (sister)

Lidia Quaranta (6 March 1891 – 5 March 1928), also known with the stage name of Lydia Quaranta, was an Italian stage and film actress of the early 20th century.

== Early career ==
A young Lidia Quaranta

Lidia Gemma Mattia Quaranta was born in Turin, Italy, the older sister of twins Isabella and Letizia Quaranta, who later on also became actresses. She began her stage career in the theatre company of Italian actor and director Dante Testa.

In 1910, Quaranta and her sister Letizia were hired by Itala Film. However, she made her film debut in the 1910 Edoardo Bencivenga-directed short L'ignota (English release title: The Unknown Woman) for the little-known Aquila Films. In 1911, she appeared in her first film for Itala titled Clio e Filete (Clio and Filete), directed by Oreste Mentasti. She went on to perform in a number of short films for Itala, including the popular 1913 crime-drama Tigris opposite actor Dante Cappelli. During the 1910s, she also worked for such film companies as Tiber, Excelsa and Ambrosio Film.

== Stardom ==
In 1914, Quaranta was cast in the title role in the lavish epic silent film Cabiria, directed by Giovanni Pastrone and with author Gabriele D'Annunzio cited as a scriptwriter. The film is set in ancient Sicily, Carthage, and Cirta during the period of the Second Punic War (218–202 BC). It follows a melodramatic main plot about an abducted girl, Cabiria, and features an eruption of Mount Etna, heinous religious rituals in Carthage, the alpine trek of Hannibal, Archimedes' defeat of the Roman fleet at the Siege of Syracuse and Scipio Africanus manoeuvring in North Africa. Apart from being a classic on its own terms, the film is also notable for being the first film in which the long-running film character Maciste (played by Bartolomeo Pagano) makes his debut. Running nearly three hours (14 reels), the film was one of the first feature-length films and was both critically and financially successful and launched Quaranta into international stardom.

From 1915 to 1920, she appeared in several films for Turin-based production companies such as Gloria and Savoia Studios. At the height of her popularity, she was earning a then-unprecedented ₤10,000 lire a month during her contract with Itala Film, making her Italy's highest-paid film actress of the era.

== Later career and death ==
After 1920, Quaranta appeared in several films for Fert Studios, Photodrama and Circe Film. Her last film appearance was in the 1925 Mario Camerini-directed Voglio tradire mio marito, starring Augusto Bandini and Alberto Collo.

In early 1928, while at home in Turin, Quaranta fell ill with pneumonia. She languished in illness for several months before dying on the day before her 37th birthday. She had appeared in over seventy films.

== Bibliography ==
- Moliterno, Gino. Historical Dictionary of Italian Cinema. Scarecrow Press, 2008. ISBN 978-0-8108-6073-5.
