= The Green Cockatoo (play) =

1898 play by Arthur Schnitzler

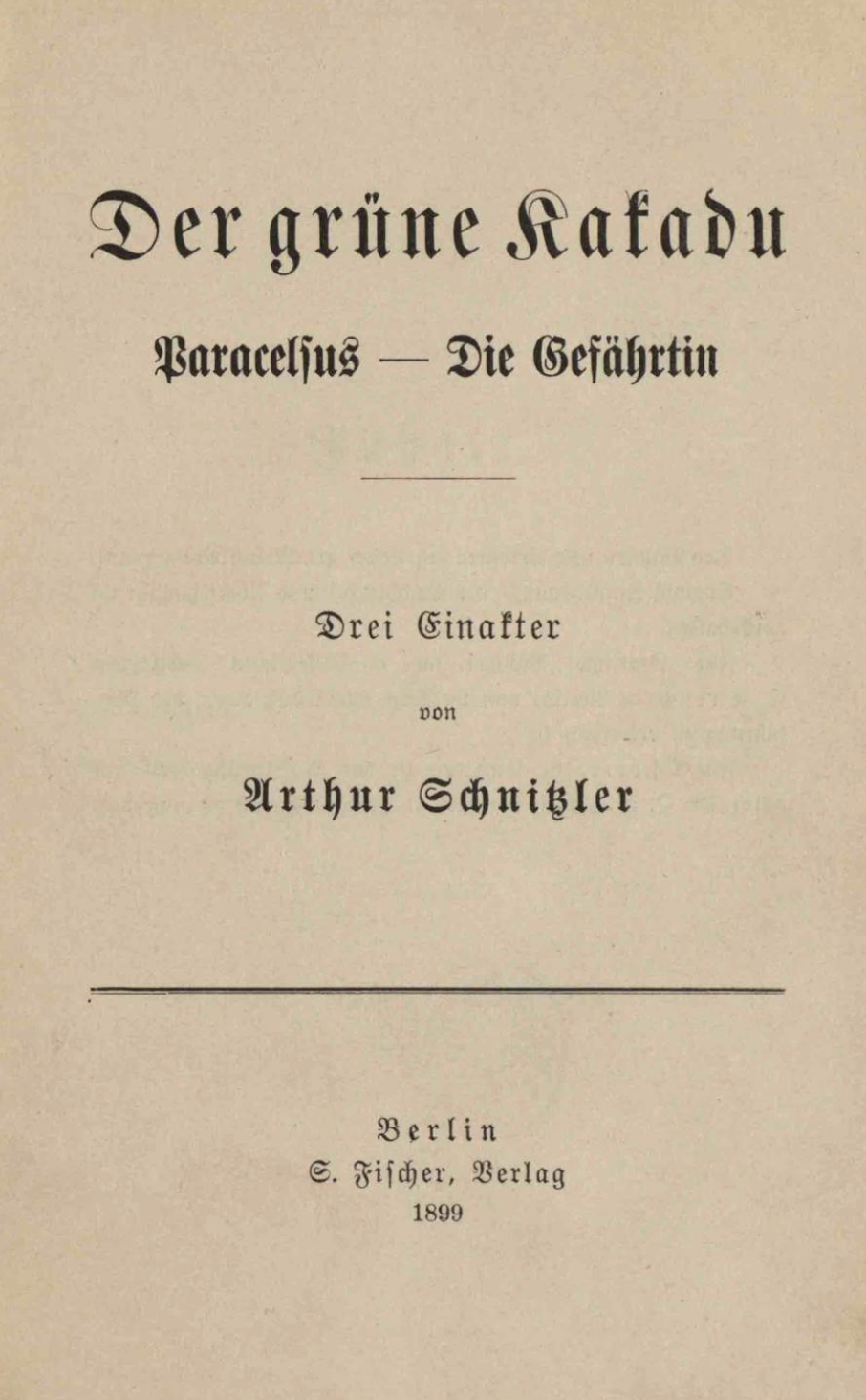
- Title page of the first edition.
- Original title: Der grüne Kakadu
- Written by: Arthur Schnitzler
- Original language: German
- Setting: Paris, France, 14 July 1789

Premiere
- Date premiered: 1 March 1899
- Place premiered: Burgtheater, Vienna

The Green Cockatoo (German: Der grüne Kakadu) is a one act grotesque by Arthur Schnitzler. It was written in 1898 and premiered on 1 March 1899, together with his plays Paracelsus and Die Gefährtin, at the Vienna Burgtheater. The play thematises the indistinguishability of truth and lies, of appearance and reality.

== Characters ==
- Emile Duke of Cadignan
- François Viscount de Nogeant
- Albin Chevalier de la Tremouille
- The Marquis of Lansac
- Séverine, his wife
- Rollin, poet
- Prospère, landlord, former theatre director
  - His troupe: Henri, Balthasar, Guillaume, Scaevola, Jules, Etienne, Maurice, Georgette, Michette, Flipotte
- Léocadie, actress, Henri's wife
- Grasset, philosopher
- Lebrêt, tailor
- Grain, a vagabond
- The Commissionar
- Aristocrats, actors, actresses, citizens & their wives

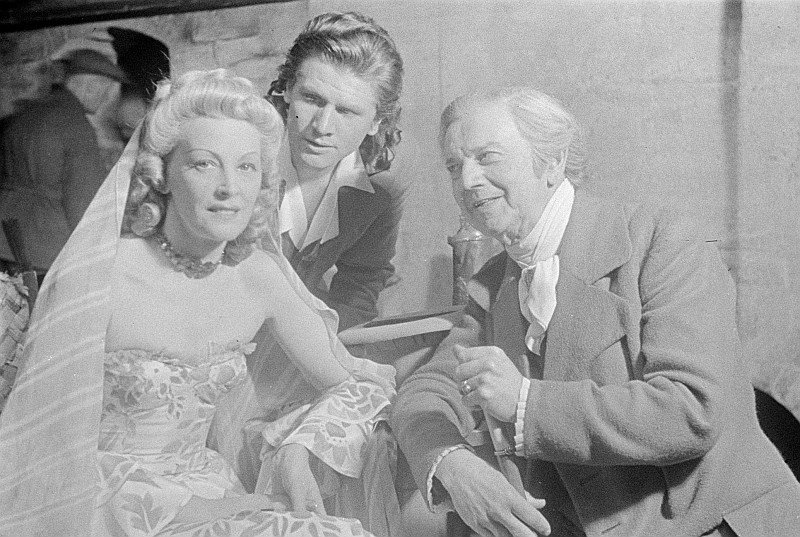
Scene from Der grüne Kakadu at the Renaissance-Theater Berlin, 1945

== Plot ==
Paris 1789: Prospère, a former theatre director, runs a dive called "The Green Cockatoo". Many unsuccessful actors, Prospère's former employees, are regulars. But the tavern is also frequented by aristocrats. They hope to get the pleasant thrill of being among real street hustlers and other riffraff. So the actors play criminals. They brag to each other about their violent deeds. On 14 July, the day the French Revolution broke out, the real turmoil of the street now enters the scene. Reality and play intermingle, and for the noble spectators as well as for the actors it becomes increasingly difficult to distinguish roles from real people and play from truth.

== Adaptations ==
- Der grüne Kakadu, an opera by composer Richard Mohaupt which premiered on 16 September 1958.
- Der grüne Kakadu, a 1963 film by Austrian director Michael Kehlmann.

== Editions ==
- Schnitzler, Arthur (1899). "Der grüne Kakadu". Der grüne Kakadu. Paracelsus - Die Gefährtin. Berlin: Fischer. pp. 95–178. (First edition.)
- Schnitzler, Arthur (1962). "Der grüne Kakadu". Die Dramatischen Werke. Vol. 1. Berlin: Fischer. pp. 515–552.
- Schnitzler, Arthur (2017). Scheffel, Michael (ed.). Der grüne Kakadu. Stuttgart: Reclam.
- Schnitzler, Arthur (2020). Lindner, Anna (ed.). Der grüne Kakadu: Historisch-kritische Ausgabe. Berlin: De Gruyter. doi:10.1515/9783110677058. ISBN 3110676265.

== Translations ==
- Schnitzler, Arthur (1913). The Green Cockatoo And Other Plays. Translated by Samuel, Horace B. London, Edinburgh: Gay & Hancock. pp. 8–58.
- Schnitzler, Arthur (1917). "The Green Cockatoo". Anatol, Living Hours, The Green Cockatoo. Translated by Colbron, Isabel. New York: Boni & Liveright. pp. 187–226.
- Schnitzler, Arthur (2004). "The Green Cockatoo". Round Dance and Other Plays. Translated by Davies, J M Q. Oxford: Oxford University Press. pp. 109–143. ISBN 0-19-280459-6.
- Schnitzler, Arthur (2007). "The Green Cockatoo". Eight Plays. Translated by Cunningham, William L; Palmer, David. Evanston: Northwestern University. pp. 287–332. ISBN 0-8101-1933-1.
