= Mario Caserini =

Italian film director (1874–1920)

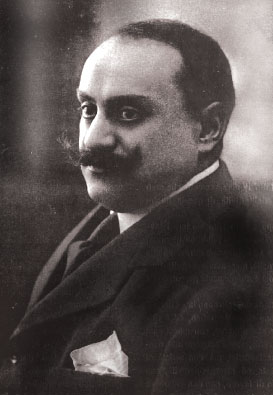
- Caserini in 1913
- Born: 26 February 1874; Rome, Italy
- Died: 17 November 1920 (aged 46); Rome, Italy
- Occupations: Director; Actor; Screenwriter
- Years active: 1906–1920
- Spouse: Maria Caserini

Mario Caserini (26 February 1874 – 17 November 1920) was an Italian film director, as well as an actor, screenwriter, and early pioneer of film making in the early portion of the 20th century. Caserini was born in Rome, Italy, and was married to the Italian actress Maria Caserini. His 1906 film Otello is believed to be the earliest film adaptation of the William Shakespeare play Othello.

== Biography ==
=== Early career ===
Mario Caserini was born in Rome to Oreste Caserini, a clerk, and Isabella Rosati. He worked as a painter for some time as a young man, before becoming the director of a children's pantomime theatre company in 1899. He also performed as an actor in Ermete Novelli's company before leaving to become a drama company director.

When Filoteo Alberini began producing films with Dante Santoni, he recruited collaborators from the world of theatre. Caserini was among the first to be hired on a permanent basis, initially as an actor with a monthly salary of 200 lire. However, he soon began working as a director. In 1905 he directed the short film Voyage to the Centre of the Moon, inspired by Méliès' science-fiction trick film A Trip to the Moon.

On 1 April 1906, Alberini and Santoni established the film production company Cines. The industrialist Adolfo Pouchain provided the funding, acting as the primary administrator with a starting capital of 250,000 lire. Pouchain invited the French director Gaston Velle to Rome, enticing him away from Pathé along with other expert French filmmakers. Caserini joined Velle as an assistant, an experience which shaped his directorial skills and led him to abandon his career as an actor.

When Velle and his collaborators returned to France in 1907, Caserini and Egidio Rossi were promoted to the position of 'artistic directors' (the title given to directors at the time), thus becoming key figures at Cines. During this period, the Roman company experienced rapid growth, increasing its production of feature films from ten in 1907 to over one hundred and thirty in 1910. This growth led to the hiring of many professionals, including the actress Maria Gasperini, who would become Caserini's wife.

During this period, Caserini directed dozens of films, ranging from Shakespearean adaptations such as Othello (1906), Hamlet (1908) and Romeo and Juliet (1908), to dramas set in modern bourgeois settings. Examples include Il cuore e il denaro (1908), Le viole (1908), Fiore fatale (1909), Povera madre! (1909), Bacio fatale (1910) and Amore e libertà (1910). His filmography from this period also included comic shorts such as Il bel Fiorindo (1909) and L'amorino (1910).

Caserini became renowned for his historical films set in the classical period, including Messalina and Catilina. The latter was a notable success, being screened simultaneously in eleven Roman cinemas in 1910. He also directed numerous films inspired by medieval history, including Giovanna d'Arco (1908), Pia de' Tolomei (1908), Federico Barbarossa (also known as La Battaglia di Legnano, 1908) and Il Cid (1910). During this period, Enrico Guazzoni, who would later become one of the most successful directors of historical epics, worked as Caserini's assistant at the Cines studios.

Caserini's most notable films from this period are historical dramas set in Renaissance Italy. These include Marco Visconti (1909), Giovanni dalle Bande Nere (1910) and Lucrezia Borgia (1910). One of Cines' most important productions of this period was Beatrice Cenci (1909), one of the first Italian films to utilise outdoor locations rather than relying entirely on painted backdrops. Caserini also addresses patriotic themes in Garibaldi (1907), Pietro Micca (1908) and Anita Garibaldi (1910).

The fame acquired by Caserini in his early years at Cines allowed him to become one of the most influential promoters of cinema in Italy. In 1910, he delivered lectures at the Roman College, showcasing the potential of this new medium which was still viewed with scepticism by cultural circles at that time. That same year, he founded a school of cinema at the Galleria Sciarra in Rome.

=== In Turin ===
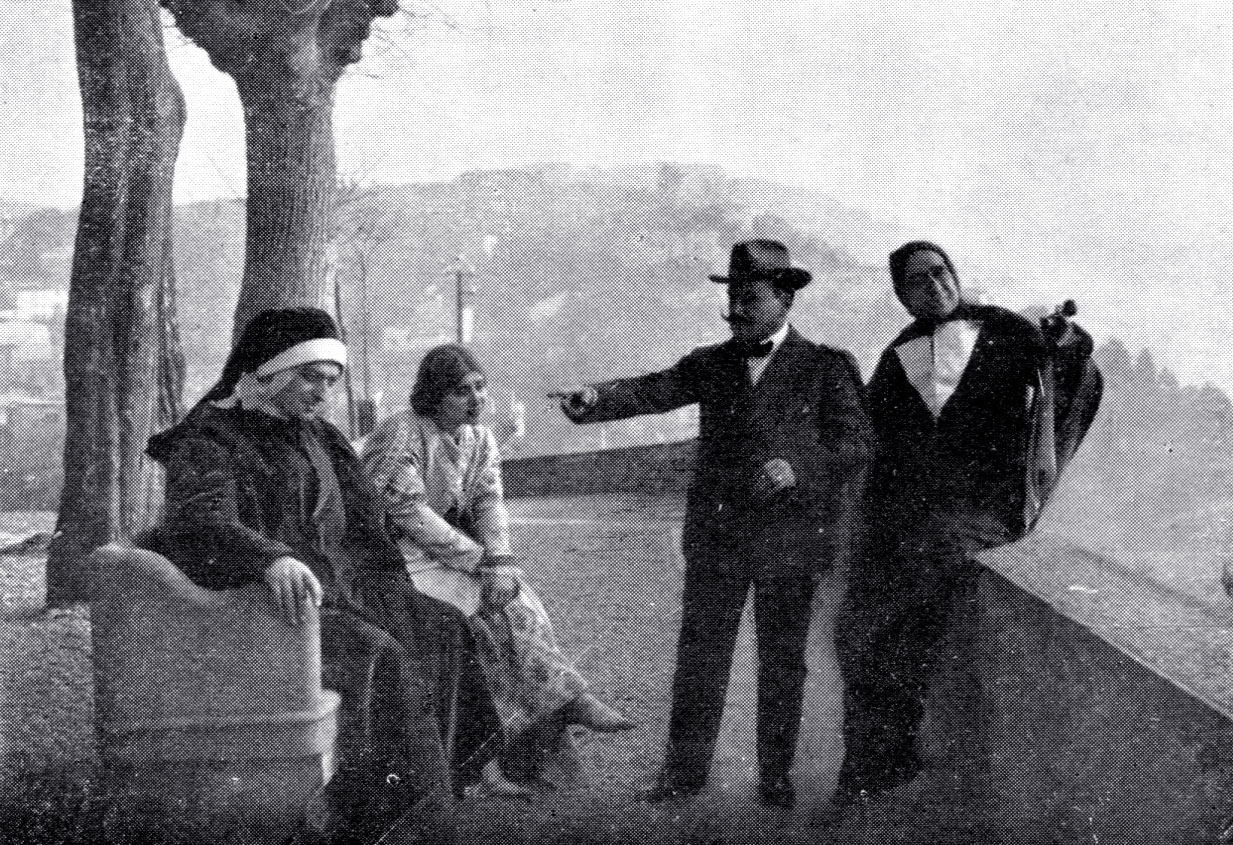
Caserini on the set of Dante e Beatrice, 1912

In 1911, Caserini began collaborating with Theatralia, a production company that sought to bring theatre actors to the screen. Theatralia primarily worked with actors from the Teatro Argentina and Eleonora Duse's company. However, this was a short-lived venture, producing only two films: Verso la colpa and L'uomo fatale. That same year, Caserini and his wife accepted an offer of 25,000 lire from Arturo Ambrosio and moved to Turin to start working for Ambrosio Film, a major competitor of Cines at the time.

On 15 December 1912, Caserini terminated his contract with Ambrosio Film, which was not due to end until 1915, and took part in establishment of the production company Gloria Film. He managed to bring most of the people who had worked with him at Cines and Ambrosio with him to the new company. The company's focus was on quality, and Caserini announced that its aim would be 'the production of feature-length art films based on subjects by authors of undisputed fame'.

Gloria Film hired Lyda Borelli, one of the most acclaimed theatre actresses of the time, and Caserini launched her on screen for the first time by directing her in the drama film Love Everlasting (1913). The film was a triumph: 2,600 metres long, it received unanimous critical acclaim and praise in Italy and abroad, was sold worldwide, made Borelli a star, and is considered one of the most representative works of early Italian cinema. According to several commentators, this work constitutes the pinnacle of Caserini's artistic activity.

While still working at Gloria Film, Caserini attempted to remake The Last Days of Pompeii, but was outcompeted by Ambrosio Films and Pasquali Film. Despite having already filmed some scenes in the Verona Arena, he was forced to abandon the project and later reused these scenes in Nerone e Agrippina. This film, intended as a response to the epics produced by the two Turin-based companies, was a resounding failure. In December 1914, Caserini left the production company he had helped found due to disagreements with the shareholders.

=== Spain and the return to Cines ===
In 1915, Caserini was still in Turin, where he founded Caserini Film. This company joined forces with two other Turin-based firms, Commedia Drama and the Film Manipulation Agency, to produce La pantomima della morte and L'amor tuo mi redime (1916). That same year, Caserini co-directed the historical drama Madame Guillotine with Enrico Guazzoni, starring Lyda Borelli, Renzo Fabiani, and Amleto Novelli. Subsequently, he was invited by the Spanish producers of Excelsa Film and moved to Barcelona with the actress Leda Gys. There, he directed her in three films that were later released in Spain: Como aquel día (1917) Flor de otoño (1917), and ¿Quién me hará olvidar sin morir?, only released in 1919.

Upon returning from Spain, Caserini settled in Rome. Here, he began collaborating with Tiber Film, which, together with Caesar Film, had become one of the two main Italian film production companies during the World War I. He worked with Tiber from 1916 to 1919. In this period he directed the propaganda film Passano gli Unni (1816), and the drama La vita e la morte, which underwent extensive censorship and was only released in 1917.

Towards the end of his career, Caserini had the opportunity to return to work with Cines. In 1918, he directed the drama Il dramma di una notte (also known as Una notte a Calcutta), the final film starring Lyda Borelli. While Italian cinema was in the midst of a deep crisis, Caserini died suddenly in late 1920, aged just 46. Some of his films were released posthumously in 1921.

== Filmography ==
=== Director ===
Anita Garibaldi (1910)

Nelly la domatrice (1912)

Parsifal (1912)

La ribalta (1912)

Love Everlasting (1913)

The Last Days of Pompeii (1913)

Nerone e Agrippina (1914)

- Il romanzo di un Pierrot (1906)
- Otello (1906) — based on Othello
- Il fornaretto di Venezia (1907)
- Garibaldi (1907) — a film about Giuseppe Garibaldi
- Amleto (1908) — based on Hamlet
- Giovanna d'Arco (1908) — film about Joan of Arc'
- Romeo e Giulietta (1908) — based on Romeo and Juliet
- Beatrice Cenci (1909) — film about Beatrice Cenci
- Bianca Cappello (1909) — film about Bianca Cappello
- La gerla di papà Martin (1909)
- L'innominato (1909)
- Macbeth (1909) — based on Macbeth
- Marco Visconti (1909)
- Parsifal (1909) — film about Percival
- La signora de Monserau (1909) — based on La Dame de Monsoreau
- I tre moschettieri (1909) — based on The Three Musketeers
- Wanda Soldanieri (1909)
- Amleto (1910) — based on Hamlet
- L'amorino (1910)
- Anita Garibaldi (1910) — film about Anita Garibaldi
- Catilina (1910) — film about Catiline
- Il Cid (1910) — based on Le Cid
- Cola di Rienzo (1910) — about Cola di Rienzo
- Federico Barbarossa (1910) — about the Battle of Legnano
- Giovanna la pazza (1910) — about Joanna the Mad
- Giovanni dalle Bande Nere (1910) — about Giovanni dalle Bande Nere
- Lucia di Lammermoor (1910) — based on Lucia di Lammermoor
- Lucrezia Borgia (1910) — about Lucrezia Borgia
- Messalina (1910) — about Messalina
- L'adultera (1911)
- Antigone (1911) — based on Antigone
- Mademoiselle de Scudery (1911) — based on Mademoiselle de Scuderi
- L'ultimo dei Frontignac (1911)
- Arabian Infamy (1912)
- I cavalieri di Rodi (1912)
- La corda dell'arco (1912)
- La mala pianta (1912)
- Mater dolorosa (1912)
- Nelly, la domatrice (1912)
- Parsifal (1912) — about Percival
- Il pellegrino (1912) — based on The Pilgrim's Progress
- La ribalta (1912)
- Santarellina (1912) — based on Mam'zelle Nitouche
- Sigfrido (1912) — based on the Nibelungenlied
- L'uomo fatale (1912)
- Dante e Beatrice (1913) — about Dante Alighieri and Beatrice Portinari
- Floretta and Patapon (1913)
- The Last Days of Pompeii (1913) — based on The Last Days of Pompeii, unrealised project that would have been the third Italian film adaptation of the novel that year
- Love Everlasting (1913)
- Il treno degli spettri (1913)
- La Gorgona (1914)
- Nerone e Agrippina (1914) — film about Nero and Agrippina
- Nidia la cieca (1914)
- Monna Vanna (1915)
- La pantomima della morte (1915)
- Amor enemigo (1916)
- Como aquel día (1916)
- La divetta del reggimento (1916)
- Flor de otoño (1916)
- In mano al destino (1916)
- Madame Guillotine (1916) — about Thérésa Tallien)
- Passano gli Unni (1916)
- Pero tu amor me redime (1916)
- La vida y la muerte (1916)
- Amore che uccide (1917)
- Il drama di una notte (1917)
- Il filo della vita (1917)
- L'ombra (1917)
- ¿Quién me hará olvidar sin morir? (1917)
- Resurrezione (1917) — based on Resurrection
- La signora Arlecchino (1918)
- Captain Fracasse (1919) — based on Captain Fracasse
- Primerose (1919)
- Tortured Soul (1919)
- Las delicias del campo (1920)
- Fior d'amore (1921)

=== Actor ===
- Il romanzo di un Pierrot (1906)
- Otello (1906)
- Romeo e Giulietta (1908)
- Wanda Soldanieri (1909)
- Como aquel día (1916)

=== Screenwriter ===
- The Last Days of Pompeii (1913)
- Como aquel día (1916)
- Flor de otoño (1916)
- Captain Fracasse (1919)

== Bibliography ==
- Brunetta, Gian Piero (2008). Il cinema muto italiano. Dalla "Presa di Roma" a "Sole" 1905 - 1929. Roma-Bari: Laterza. ISBN 978-88420-8717-5.
