= Otello (1906 film) =

1906 Italian silent film by Mario Caserini

- Directed by: Mario Caserini; Gaston Velle
- Story by: William Shakespeare
- Starring: Mario Caserini; Maria Caserini
- Release date: 30 October 1906
- Country: Italy

Otello is a 1906 Italian silent film based on the 1887 opera of the same name by Giuseppe Verdi, both being based on the William Shakespeare play Othello. The film was directed by and starred Mario Caserini, playing opposite his wife Maria Caserini. It is believed to be the earliest film adaptation of the play, released in Italy on 30 October 1906.

Gaston Velle is also credited as co-director.
