= Macbeth (1909 Italian film) =

1909 Italian film directed by Mario Caserini

- Directed by: Mario Caserini
- Based on: Macbeth by William Shakespeare
- Starring: Dante Cappelli, Maria Caserini,
- Release date: November 1909
- Country: Italy
- Language: Italian

Macbeth is a silent Italian 1909 film adaptation of the William Shakespeare play Macbeth. It was the second Macbeth film released that year (released on 27 November 1909), and is the third film version of the play. The film was directed by Mario Caserini, and starred Dante Cappelli, Maria Caserini, Amleto Palormi, and Ettore Pesci. The running time is 16 minutes and it is a black-and-white film.

The opening scene of the film "breaks the fourth wall" by showing the reel of the film but also "opens a portal to the supernatural world of the witches", according to Isabel Karremann.

== Main cast ==
- Dante Cappelli as Macbeth
- Maria Caserini as Lady Macbeth
- Amleto Palormi
- Ettore Pesci
