= Sophie and the Crime =

1955 film

- Directed by: Pierre Gaspard-Huit
- Written by: Marcel Achard; Pierre Gaspard-Huit; Pierre Lary
- Based on: Sophie and the Crime by Jacques Laurent
- Produced by: René Lafuite; Roger Richebé
- Starring: Marina Vlady; Peter van Eyck; Jean Gaven
- Cinematography: Michel Kelber
- Edited by: Yvonne Martin
- Music by: Georges Van Parys
- Production companies: Les Films Roger Richebé; Synimex; Ardennes Films
- Distributed by: Les Films Roger Richebé
- Release date: 2 August 1955
- Running time: 100 minutes
- Country: France
- Language: French

Sophie and the Crime (French: Sophie et le crime) is a 1955 French crime drama film directed by Pierre Gaspard-Huit and starring Marina Vlady, Peter van Eyck and Jean Gaven. It was shot at the Neuilly Studios in Paris. The film's sets were designed by the art director Paul Bertrand. It is based on the 1953 novel of the same title by Jacques Laurent. It is also known by the alternative title The Girl on the Third Floor.

== Synopsis ==
Sophie Brulard, a young journalist on a magazine, helps shelter her neighbour Franck Richter who is accused of killing his wife. He persuades her of his innocence, and she sets out to clear his name.

== Cast ==
- Marina Vlady as Sophie Brulard
- Peter van Eyck as Franck Richter
- Jean Gaven as Ernest Sapinaud
- Dora Doll as Louise Richter
- Marcelle Géniat as Mme Gretchikine
- Paul Guers as Claude Broux
- René Havard as Tony
- Maryse Martin as La serveuse aux saucisses
- André Bervil as Un commissaire
- Alain Bouvette as Un photographe
- Pierre Fromont as Un inspecteur
- Olga Baïdar-Poliakoff as La journaliste dactylo
- Yvette Lebon as Mme Gontcharoff
- Pierre Dux as Commissaire Moret
- Daniel Emilfork as Le barman du Montana

== Bibliography ==
- Bessy, Maurice & Chirat, Raymond. Histoire du cinéma français: 1951–1955. Pygmalion, 1989.
- Goble, Alan. The Complete Index to Literary Sources in Film. Walter de Gruyter, 1999.
