= Die Gefährtin =

Austrian play

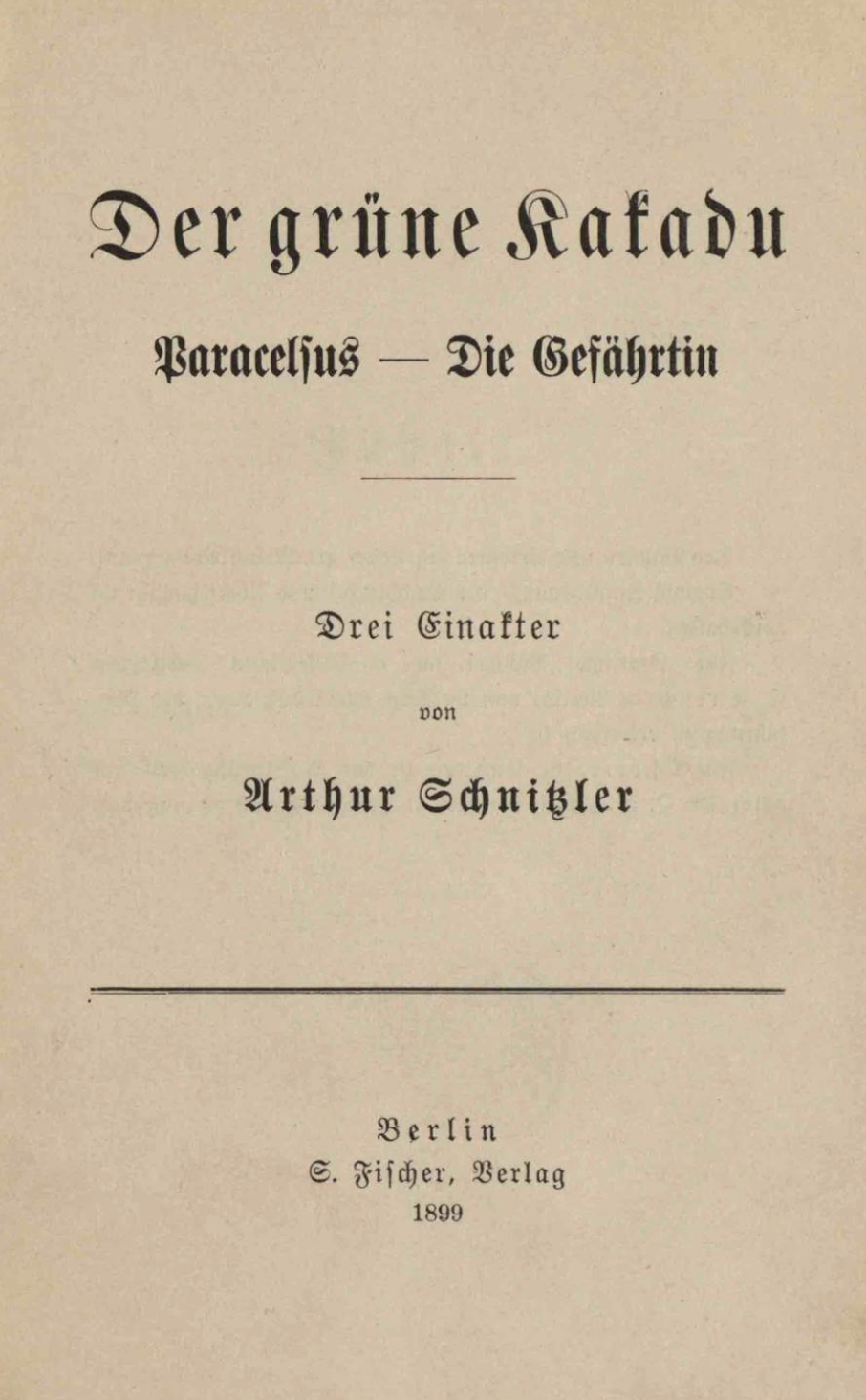
- Title page of the first edition.
- Original language: German
- Written by: Arthur Schnitzler
- Setting: Vienna

Premiere
- Date: 1 March 1899
- Place: Burgtheater, Vienna

Die Gefährtin is a one-act play by Arthur Schnitzler, which premiered on 1 March 1899 at the Burgtheater in Vienna. In the same year, S. Fischer in Berlin published the text edition together with the one-act plays Der grüne Kakadu and Paracelsus.

In a first version, Schnitzler had already developed the material of a husband who has to revise his view of marriage after the death of his wife in the novella Der Wittwer published in 1894. This became the model from which Schnitzler dramatically developed the material from 1896.

== Time and location ==
The play is set on an autumn evening towards the end of the 19th century in a summer resort near Vienna.

== Content ==
The mourners believe that Robert never loved Eveline, who died of a myocardial infarction. The professor acts accordingly. He wants to forget; throw himself into academic work. His neighbour Olga Merholm appears and wants letters back that she had once written to Eveline. In the course of the dialogue between the two neighbours, the viewer learns that Robert saw Eveline as a lover, not a companion. Worse still, Robert lets slip that his wife had an affair with his friend Doctor Alfred Hausmann during his lifetime. This began three years ago.

Alfred arrives at the news of her death. It soon becomes clear to Robert that everything was completely different. Alfred has been married to a Viennese woman for two years. Despite this surprising clarification, the newcomer is chased out by the master of the house. Alfred leaves.

Olga enlightens Robert and the audience. Alfred has not betrayed Robert. Eveline knew about Alfred's impending marriage. This is also clear from the letters Olga wants back. Robert does not understand this at all. If Olga knew everything, why didn't she tell him? Olga can only regret Eveline's life of loneliness.

== Characters ==
- Professor Robert Pilgram
- Doctor Alfred Hausmann
- Professor Werkmann
- Professor Brand
- Olga Merholm
- A servant

== Reception ==
- Alfred Kerr also praises Schnitzler's drama because it contains the elements of "concealment" and the renunciation of "completeness". In Die Gefährtin, the exact truth of the assertion of the above. Theatre critic can be demonstrated, for example, with the character of Olga Merholm. The spectator, however, has to think until he comes to it: the widower Professor Pilgram, blinded during his wife's lifetime, has sought the proximity of the married neighbour Olga Merholm. Now that his friend Doctor Alfred Hausmann has opened his eyes about his relationship with the deceased Eveline, the widower comes clean. He leaves the summer resort. The professor thus distances himself from the neighbour who deliberately kept him in the dark.
- The play demonstrates the futurelessness of bourgeois marriage (Scheible).
- In his short review, Hermann Korte classifies the play as "analytic drama".

== Film adaptations ==
- Die Gefährtin. Director: Alfred Braun. ARD, SFB anno 1954. Actors: Ruth Grossi, Günther Hadank, Wolfgang Lukschy.
- Die Gefährtin. Director: Peter F. Steinbach. ARD, WDR anno 1966. Actors: Carl Lange, Hertha Martin, Hannes Siegl.

== Radio plays ==
Hörspiele, Einträge 28 und 29

- Die Gefährtin – directed by Otto Ambros, 12 May 1946 vom ORF-Studio Wien gesendet.
- Die Gefährtin – directed by Klaus Gmeiner, 20 December 1975 broadcast by ORF and SFB. Actors: Romuald Pekny, Aglaja Schmid, Kurt Heintel, Hubert Kiurina, Peter Uray, and Leopold Rudolf.

== Editions ==
- Schnitzler, Arthur (1899). "Die Gefährtin". Der grüne Kakadu. Paracelsus - Die Gefährtin. Berlin: Fischer. pp. 59–94. (First edition.)
- Schnitzler, Arthur (2023). Rauchenbacher, Marina (ed.). Der Witwer. Die Gefährtin: Historisch-kritische Ausgabe. Berlin: De Gruyter. doi:10.1515/9783111085593. ISBN 978-3-11-107755-0.
- Arthur Schnitzler: Die Gefährtin. Schauspiel in einem Akt. pp. 259–277 in Heinz Ludwig Arnold (ed.): Arthur Schnitzler: Reigen. Die Einakter. Mit einem Nachwort von Hermann Korte. S. Fischer, Frankfurt 1961 (2000 edition). 602 pages, ISBN 3-10-073557-9

== Translations ==
- Schnitzler, Arthur (1913). "The Mate". The Green Cockatoo And Other Plays. Translated by Samuel, Horace B. London, Edinburgh: Gay & Hancock. pp. 59–84.

== Secondary Literature ==
- Therese Nickl (ed.), Heinrich Schnitzler (ed.): Arthur Schnitzler. Jugend in Wien. Eine Autobiographie. Mit einem Nachwort von Friedrich Torberg. Fischer Taschenbuch. Frankfurt 2006. 381 pages, ISBN 978-3-596-16852-1 (© Verlag Fritz Molden, Vienna 1968)
- Hartmut Scheible: Arthur Schnitzler. rowohlts monographien. Rowohlt Taschenbuch Verlag, Reinbek bei Hamburg Februar 1976 (December 1990 edition). 160 pages, ISBN 3-499-50235-6
- Peter Sprengel: Geschichte der deutschsprachigen Literatur 1870–1900. Von der Reichsgründung bis zur Jahrhundertwende. C.H. Beck, Munich 1998, ISBN 3-406-44104-1
- Gero von Wilpert: Lexikon der Weltliteratur. Deutsche Autoren A – Z. p. 555, 2nd column, 20. Z.v.u. Stuttgart 2004. 698 pages, ISBN 3-520-83704-8
