= Love Everlasting (1913 film) =

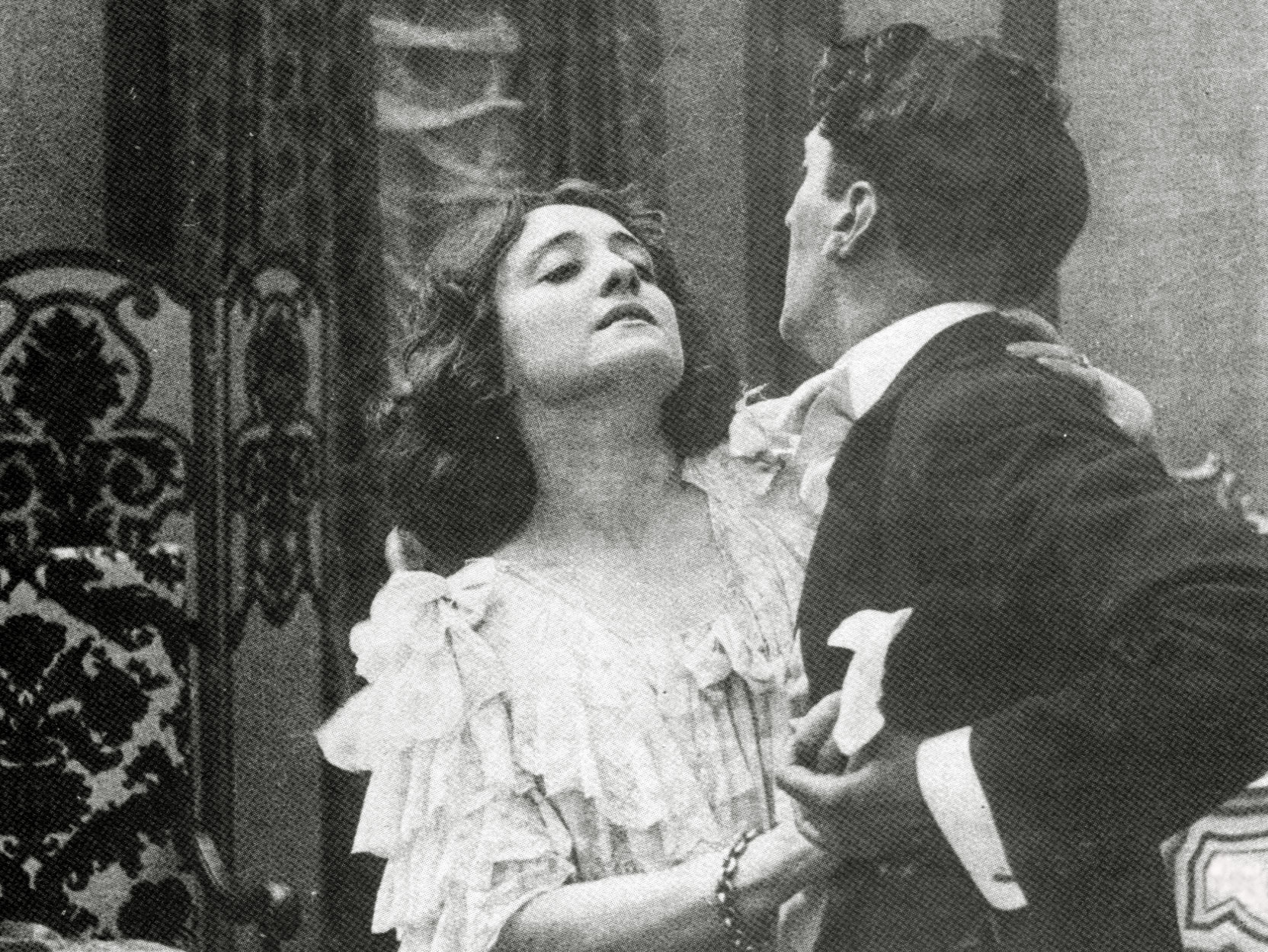
- Still with Lyda Borelli and Mario Bonnard
- Directed by: Mario Caserini
- Written by: Emiliano Bonetti; G. Monleone
- Starring: Lyda Borelli; Mario Bonnard; Gianpaolo Rosmino; Dante Cappelli
- Cinematography: Angelo Scalenghe
- Production company: Gloria Film
- Distributed by: Gloria Film
- Release date: 1913
- Running time: 90 minutes
- Country: Italy
- Languages: Silent; Italian intertitles

Love Everlasting (1913)

Love Everlasting (Italian: Ma l'amor mio non muore, more literally translated as But My Love Will Never Die) is a 1913 Italian silent drama film directed by Mario Caserini and starring Lyda Borelli, Mario Bonnard and Gianpaolo Rosmino. With the possible exception of Cabiria (1914), it is the most famous of early Italian silent films. It was made in Turin by Gloria Film. Borelli's appearance in the film led to her being considered the first diva of the cinema.

== Cast ==
- Lyda Borelli as Elsa Holbein
- Mario Bonnard as Prince Maximilien of Wallenstein
- Gianpaolo Rosmino as Moise Sthar
- Vittorio Rossi Pianelli as Col. Julius Holbein
- Dante Cappelli as Granduke of Wallenstein
- Maria Caserini as Granduchess of Wallenstein
- Camillo De Riso as Schaudard
- Emilio Petacci as Col. Theubner
- Antonio Monti as General
- Letizia Quaranta
- Felice Metellio
- Gentile Miotti

== Bibliography ==
- Doane, Mary Ann (2013). Femmes Fatales. New York: Routledge. ISBN 978-0415903202.
- Moliterno, Gino (2009). The A to Z of Italian Cinema. Lanham, Maryland: Scarecrow Press. ISBN 978-0810870598.
