= The Woman at Midnight =

1925 film directed by Carlo Campogalliani

- Directed by: Carlo Campogalliani
- Produced by: Paulo Benedetti
- Cinematography: Paulo Benedetti, Victor Ciacchi, Pedro Sgaglione
- Distributed by: Benedetti Filmes, Valle Film
- Release date: 1925
- Running time: 60 minutes
- Country: Brazil
- Language: Silent

The Woman at Midnight (Portuguese: La Mujer de medianoche) is a 1925 Brazilian mystery film drama directed by Carlo Campogalliani.

The film premiered in Rio de Janeiro on 7 September 1925.

== Cast ==
- Paulo Benedetti
- Carlo Campogalliani as Jorge Peirada
- Amália de Oliveira
- Polly de Viana
- Bastos Estefânio
- Augusto Gonçalves as Mena
- Luiz Lizman
- Lia Lupini
- Letizia Quaranta
- Alberto Sereno
- Ivo Soares
- Luiza Valle
