= Floretta and Patapon (1913 film) =

- Directed by: Mario Caserini
- Written by: Maurice Hennequin (play), Pierre Veber (play)
- Production company: Caserini Film
- Distributed by: Caserini Film
- Release date: 1913
- Country: Italy
- Languages: Silent; Italian intertitles

Floretta and Patapon (Italian: Florette e Patapon) is a 1913 Italian silent comedy film directed by Mario Caserini. It was remade in 1927 under the same title.

== Cast ==
In alphabetical order

- Mary Bayma-Riva as Clara
- Mario Bonnard as Armando
- Maria Caserini as Bianca Patapon
- Camillo De Riso as Giuliano Barbet
- Carlotta Giani as Mazzabran, sua madre
- Arduina Lapucci as Chechette
- Felice Metellio as Mombrisson
- Gentile Miotti as Florette, suo marito
- Antonio Monti as Jumbard, capitano
- Letizia Quaranta as Enrichetta Florette
- Vittorio Rossi Pianelli as Patapon, suo marito
- Telemaco Ruggeri as Pontois

== Bibliography ==
- Moliterno, Gino. The A to Z of Italian Cinema. Scarecrow Press, 2009. ISBN 978-0-8108-7059-8
