= Isabella Quaranta =

Italian actress (1892-1975)

- Born: 30 December 1892; Turin
- Died: 3 April 1975 (aged 82); Milan
- Occupation: Silent film actor
- Relatives: Letizia Quaranta, Lidia Quaranta

Isabella Maria Rosa Teresa Quaranta (30 December 1892 – 3 April 1975) was an Italian silent film actress. She was the sister of actress Lidia Quaranta and the twin sister of actress Letizia Quaranta.

Isabella Quaranta was born on 30 December 1892 in Turin, the daughter of Giuseppe Quaranta and Beatrice Rissoglio. The sisters began their stage career in the acting company of Dante Testa and transitioned to movies with Itala Film. Isabella appeared in a number of silent films, including Romanticismo (1915), directed by her future brother-in-law Carlo Campogalliani, before retiring in 1917.

Isabella Quaranta died on 3 April 1975 in Milan.

== Death and legacy ==
- Alza una gamba e balla! (1912)
- A Who-Pro-Quo (1912)
- Ho l'onore di chiedere la mano di vostra figlia (1912)
- May Piu! (1914)
- L'orrendo blasone (1914)
- Nudo di Zingava (1915)
- Romanticismo (1915)
- Redenzione (1917)
- Il Pescatore Del Rhone (1917)
- Tragica Visione (1917)
- Una Mascherata in Mare (1917)
