= Letizia Quaranta =

Italian film actress (1892–1977)

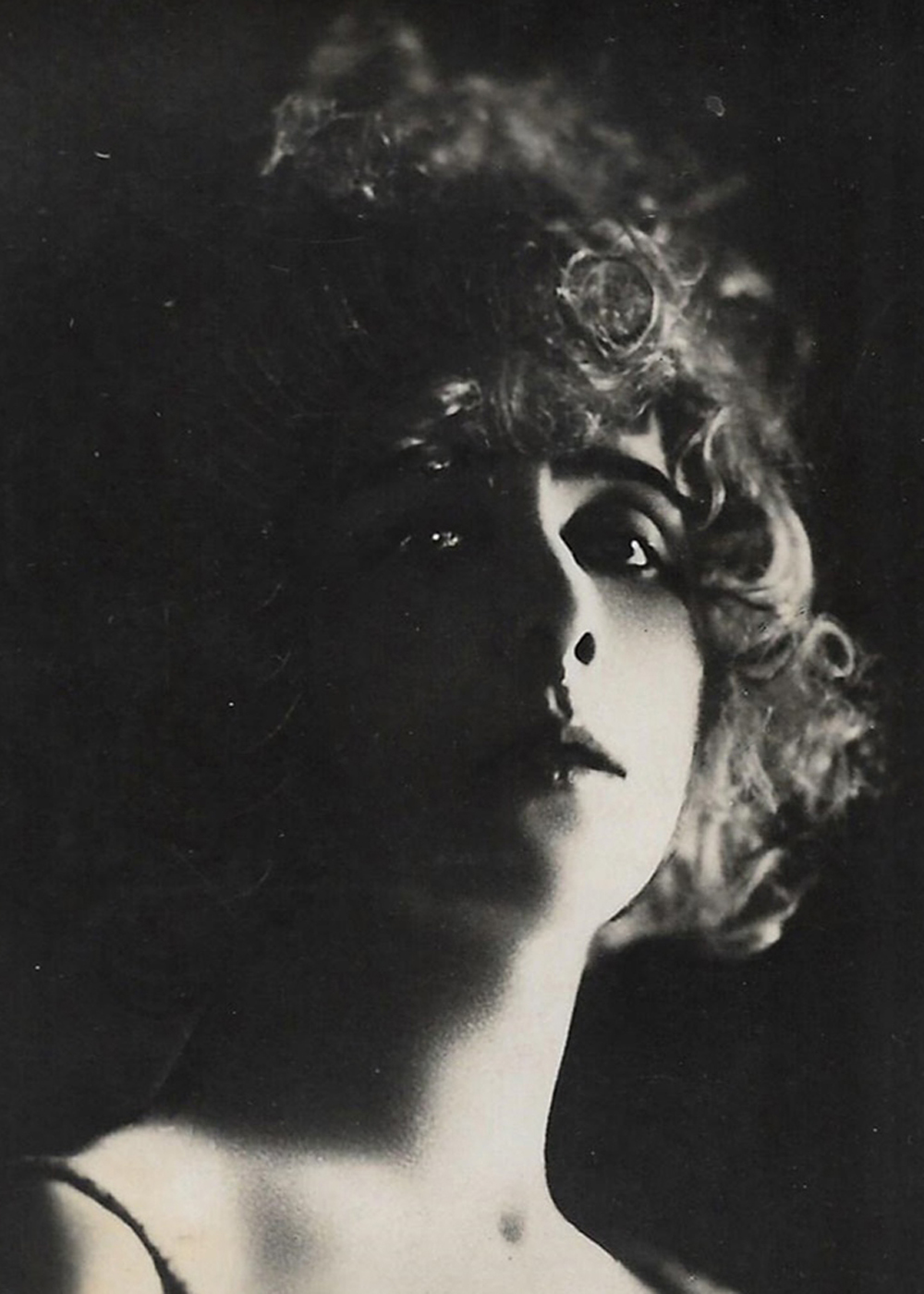
- Letizia Quaranta in the 1920s
- Born: Letizia Beatrice Giuseppina Angela Quaranta; 30 December 1892; Turin, Kingdom of Italy
- Died: 9 January 1977 (aged 84); Rome, Italy
- Occupation: Actress
- Years active: 1910–1954 (film)

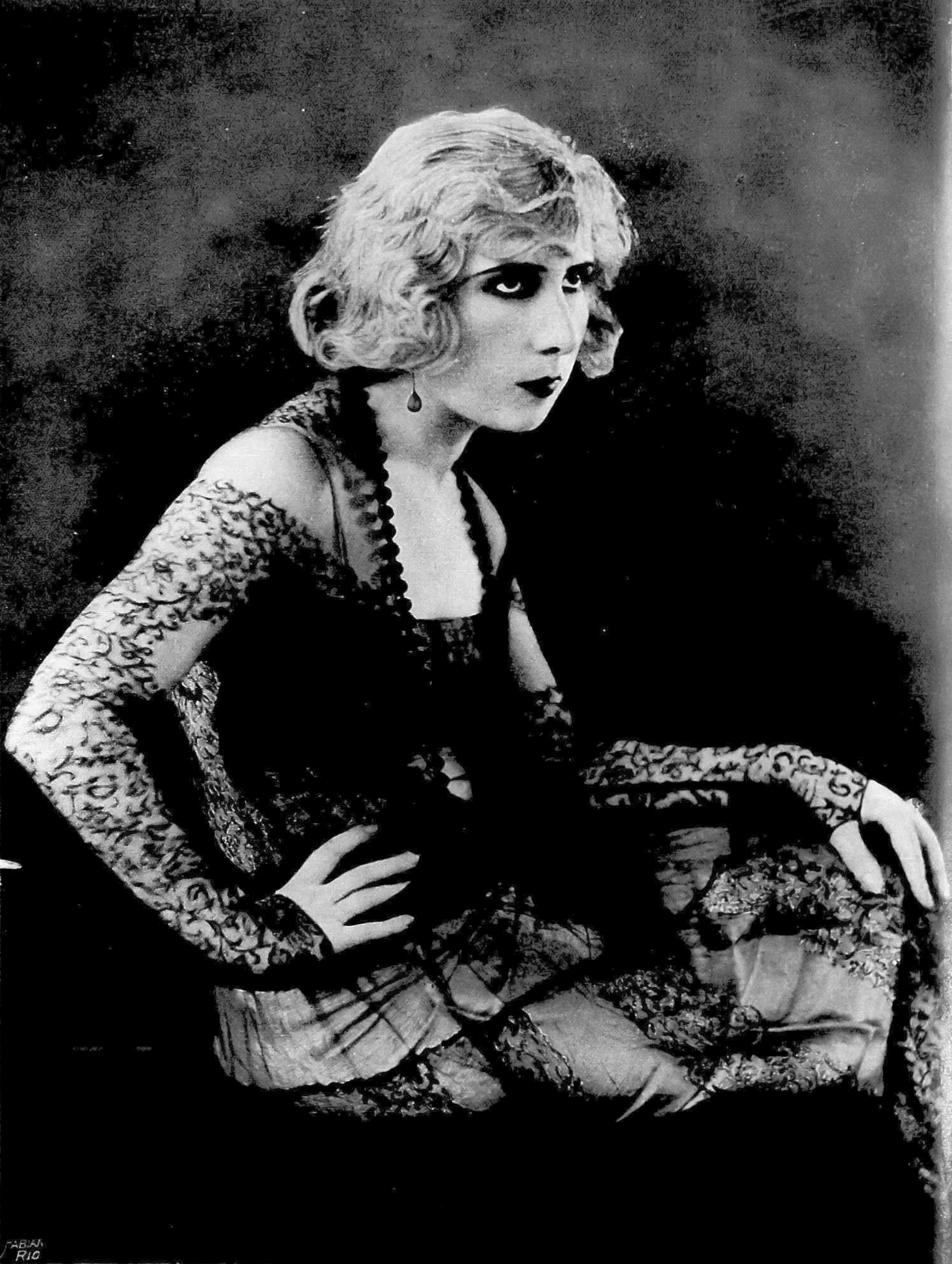
Letizia Quaranta in a photograph from the Brazilian cinema magazine A Scena Muda in 1924

Letizia Quaranta (30 December 1892 – 9 January 1977), also known with the stage name of Laetitia Quaranta, was an Italian film actress. She was mainly active in the silent era of cinema.

== Early life ==
Letizia Quaranta was born in Turin in 1892 into a wealthy family, the younger sister of Lidia and the twin of Isabella (both actresses), and the daughter of Giuseppe Quaranta and Beatrice Rissoglio.

== Career ==
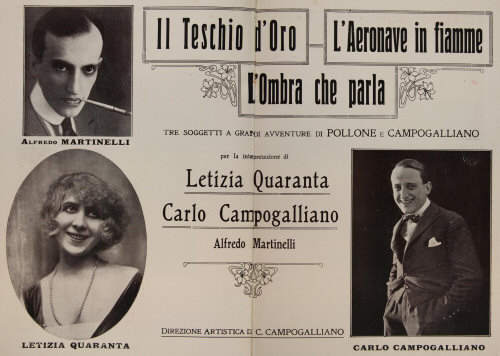
Il teschio d'oro (1920)

Letizia Quaranta began work in the silent film industry in 1912. Her introduction to this world was facilitated by her elder sister Lydia when she joined Itala Film, a prominent production company based in Turin at the time. Her cinematic debut occurred in 1912 with the film T'ho ancor baciato, or muoio lieta! directed by Sandro Camasio.

From 1913 onward, she established herself as a regular actress at Itala, where she notably portrayed Elena, sharing the screen with her sister Lyda, who assumed the role of Dorina in Cammasio's Addio giovinezza (1913). Letizia Quaranta also took on supporting roles at the Turin-based Gloria Film company, appearing in films starring Lyda Borelli, such as Love Everlasting (1913) and La memoria dell'altro (1914). She depicted characters like Enrichetta Floretta in Floretta and Patapon (1913) and Ottavia in Nerone e Agrippina (1914). During her tenure at Gloria Film, she appeared in numerous films directed by Camillo De Riso.

In a short span, Quaranta emerged as one of the most sought-after actresses of her era. She was directed by various filmmakers, including Carlo Campogalliani, whom she eventually married in 1921. Campogalliani directed her in films both at Itala and at his own production company, Campogalliani Film. Their collaborations took place from the late 1910s to the early 1920s and included noteworthy works like Maciste innamorato (1919), La trilogia di Maciste (1920) starring Bartolomeo Pagano, and Hedda Gabler (1920) featuring Italia Almirante Manzini. Around 1923, Carlo Campogalliani and Letizia Quaranta moved to Argentina to work on three films directed by Campogalliani, in addition to one film produced in Brazil.

== Later career and death ==
Upon their return to Rome in 1930/31, Quaranta continued her acting career. However, with the advent of sound in cinema, she encountered challenges in adapting to the new medium. She appeared in only seven films since 1931, most of which were directed by her husband. Her acting career concluded in the mid-1950s.

Letizia Quaranta died on January 9, 1977, at the age of 84 in Rome.

== Selected filmography ==
- Love Everlasting (1913)
- Floretta and Patapon (1913)
- Hedda Gabler (1920)
- The Woman at Midnight (1925)
- The Doctor in Spite of Himself (1931)
- The Devil's Lantern (1931)
- Forbidden Music (1942)
- The Innocent Casimiro (1945)
- The Devil's Gondola (1946)
- Orphan of the Ghetto (1954)

== Bibliography ==
- Moliterno, Gino. The A to Z of Italian Cinema. Scarecrow Press, 2009.
