= Captain Fracasse (1919 film) =

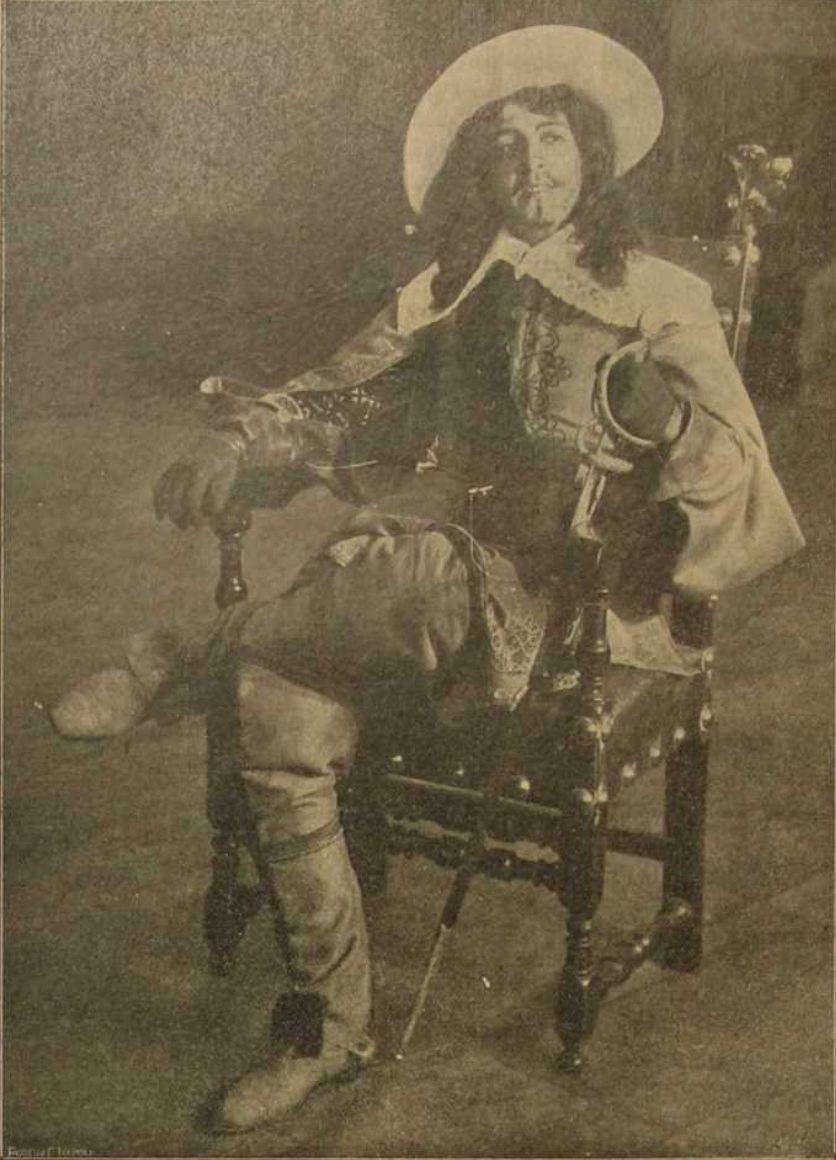
- Franco Zeni in a publicity still
- Directed by: Mario Caserini
- Written by: Théophile Gautier (novel); Mario Caserini
- Cinematography: Alessandro Bona
- Production company: Palatino Film
- Distributed by: Unione Cinematografica Italiana
- Release date: 13 January 1919
- Country: Italy
- Languages: Silent; Italian intertitles

Captain Fracasse (Italian: Capitan Fracassa) is a 1919 Italian silent historical film directed by Mario Caserini. It is based on the 1863 novel of the same name by Théophile Gautier.

== Cast ==
In alphabetical order

- Ferruccio Biancini as Duca di Vallombrosa
- Amedeo Ciaffi
- Gemma De Ferrari as Agostina
- Nini Dinelli as Chiquita
- Mimi
- Roberto Spiombi as Leandro
- Teresa Termini as Isabella
- Ernesto Treves as Vallombrosa padre
- Franco Zeni as Capitan Fracassa

== Bibliography ==
- Goble, Alan. The Complete Index to Literary Sources in Film. Walter de Gruyter, 1999.
