= Therese (novel) =

Novel by Arthur Schnitzler

Therese. Chronik eines Frauenlebens (Therese: The Chronicle of a Woman's Life) is a novel by Arthur Schnitzler first published in 1928.

The story concerns a woman who gives birth to an illegitimate child during the final decades of the Austro-Hungarian monarchy, and who, having to live in poverty herself, is unable to secure an education for her son. Therese has a succession of lovers, all of whom act irresponsibly towards her. Eventually she meets a wealthy Jewish entrepreneur who proposes to her. However, his sudden death before they can get married thwarts all her hopes of the good life, and in the end she is killed by her ungrateful and estranged son Franz.

== See also ==
- Matricide
- For the motif of the ungrateful child, see also The Woman Who Did and Mildred Pierce.
