= Pierre Gaspard-Huit =

French film director

- Born: 29 November 1917; Libourne, France
- Died: 1 May 2017 (aged 99); Paris, France
- Occupations: Film director; Screenwriter
- Years active: 1948–1983

Jean-Michel Pierre Gaspard-Huit (29 November 1917 – 1 May 2017), also known under the pseudonym Michel Clermontet, was a French film director and screenwriter.

== Biography ==
Born in Libourne, Gaspard-Huit developed an early interest in cinema and travelled to Germany in the 1930s to study filmmaking. On the advice of director René Clair, he enrolled at the Cours Simon in Paris in order to learn about acting as well as filmmaking. He graduated with first prize.

Mobilized in 1940, he was taken prisoner of war and spent several years in Germany. From 1943, he worked as an assistant director at Bavaria Studios in Munich. In January 1945, he was hired by director Hans Steinhoff as an assistant director on the crime film Shiva und die Galgenblume (Shiva and the Gallows Blossom), which was scheduled to be filmed at the Barrandov Studios in Prague. However, around March 1945, part of the production team left the studios because of the deteriorating security situation for German nationals in Prague. As a result, the film was never completed.

After returning to France, Gaspard-Huit worked as an assistant director and screenwriter. He co-directed La Fugue de monsieur Perle (Run Away Mr. Perle) (1952) with Roger Richebé and in 1954 directed his first feature film, Sophie et le Crime (Sophie and the Crime),starring Marina Vlady, for whom he also adapted the screenplay.

Throughout his career, he directed numerous prominent actors, including Brigitte Bardot, Jean Marais in Le Capitaine Fracasse (Captain Fracasse), Peter van Eyck, Hildegard Knef, as well as Romy Schneider and Alain Delon in Christine. He directed the 1963 film Shéhérazade, which starred Anna Karina.

Gaspard-Huit was also frequently called upon by film studios to replace directors who were unable to complete their commitments for various reasons, including conflicts with members of the production or, in some cases, their death.

From the mid-1960s, Gaspard-Huit increasingly directed television productions in France and Germany, including Les Galapiats (The Scamps) and La Légende de Bas-de-Cuir (The Leatherstocking Legend). His final screenwriting credit was L'Homme de Suez (The Man from Suez, 1983), after which he retired from the film industry.

In a 2014 interview, he discussed his career and his professional encounters with several leading French actors.

Gaspard-Huit died in Paris on 1 May 2017, aged 99.

== Personal life ==
In 1959 Gaspard-Huit married actress and model Claudine Auger. She was 18, and he was 41 years old. Claudine acted in several of his films. The couple divorced in 1969. He later married actress Marie-Christine Demarest.

== Filmography ==
- La Vie tragique d'Utrillo (1949)
- L'Herbe à la Reyne (1951)
- La Fugue de Monsieur Perle (1952) (co-directed with Roger Richebé)
- The Little Czar (1954)
- Sophie and the Crime (1955)
- Maid in Paris (1956)
- The Bride Is Much Too Beautiful (1956)
- Les Lavandières du Portugal (1957)
- Christine (1958)
- Captain Fracasse (1961)
- Shéhérazade (1963)
- Gibraltar (1964)
- Living It Up (1966)
- The Last of the Mohicans (1968) (co-directed with Jean Dréville and Sergiu Nicolaescu)
