= Maria Caserini =

Italian actress (1884–1969)

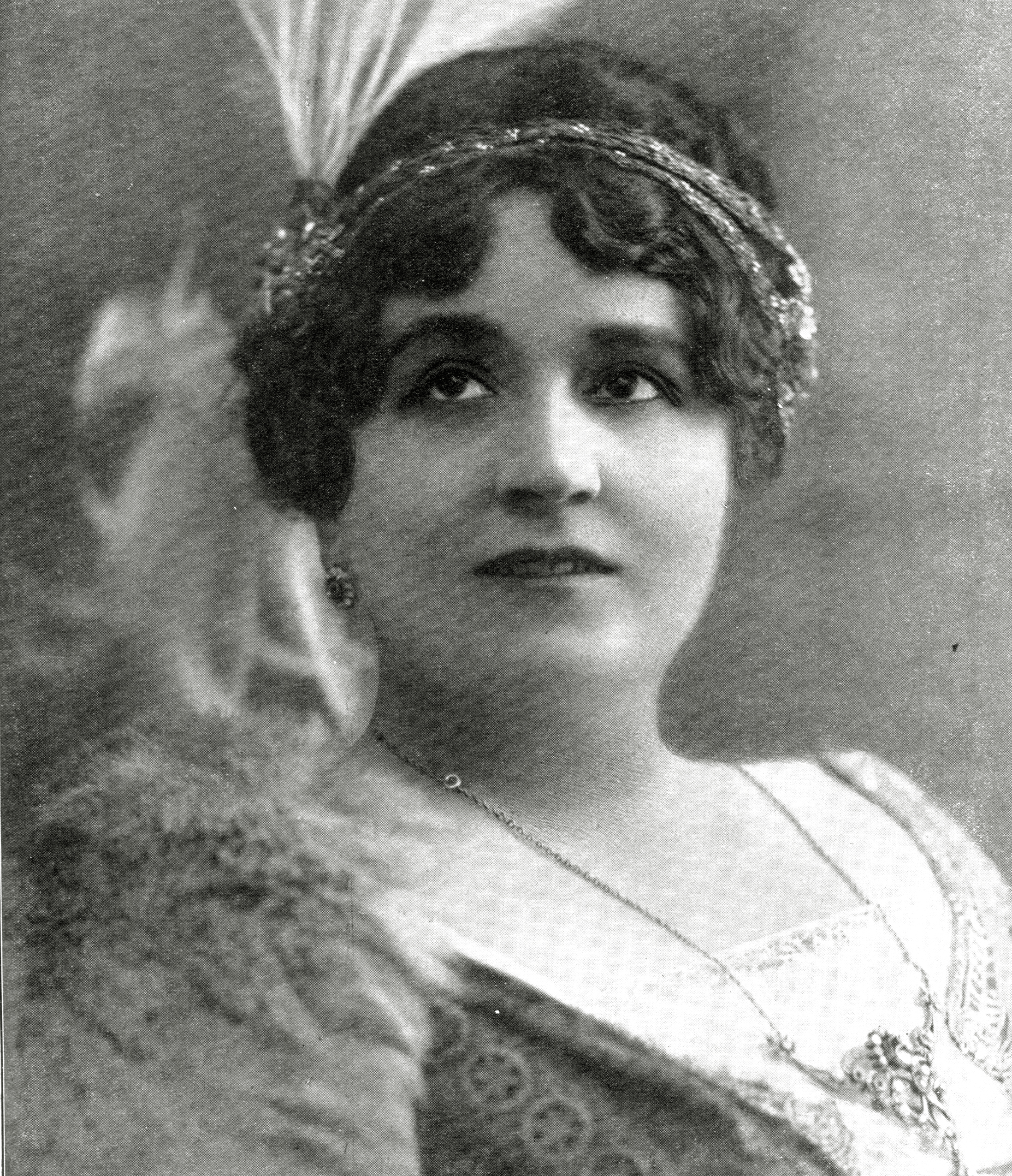
Caserini in 1914

Maria Caserini (née Gasperini; 24 July 1884 – 15 April 1969) was an Italian stage and film actress, as well as a pioneer of filmmaking during the early 20th century. She often starred in adaptations of stage and film productions for the works of William Shakespeare.

Born in Milan, she started acting in stage productions at a young age. Her first film was in 1906, in what is believed to be the earliest film adaptation of Shakespeare's Othello, titled Otello, which was directed by her husband, Mario Caserini. She appeared in a film adaptation of Romeo and Juliet in 1907, along with appearing in another thirteen films through 1909. One of those films was the 1909 production Macbeth, which was directed by her husband.

From 1910 to 1927 she appeared in sixty five films, all produced in Italy, most of which were directed by her husband, and many of which were Shakespearean adaptations. She also appears in Ma l’amor mio non muore!, in 1913.

She continued to perform in theater productions well after she left her film career. She was residing in Milan at the time of her death on 15 April 1969.

== Selected filmography ==
- Messalina (1910)
- Agrippina (1911)
- Love Everlasting (1913)
- Floretta and Patapon (1913)
- Monna Vanna (1915)
- The Railway Owner (1919)
- The Shadow (1920)
