= Captain Fracasse (1929 film) =

1929 film

- Directed by: Alberto Cavalcanti; Henry Wulschleger
- Written by: Théophile Gautier (novel); Alberto Cavalcanti
- Produced by: P.J. de Venloo
- Starring: Pierre Blanchar; Lien Deyers; Charles Boyer
- Cinematography: Mario Badouaille
- Production company: Lutèce Films
- Distributed by: Films P.J. de Venloo
- Release date: 15 February 1929
- Running time: 92 minutes
- Country: France
- Languages: Silent; French intertitles

Captain Fracasse (French: Le capitaine Fracasse) is a 1929 French silent adventure film directed by Alberto Cavalcanti and Henry Wulschleger and starring Pierre Blanchar, Lien Deyers and Charles Boyer. It is based on the 1863 novel of the same name by Théophile Gautier.

The film's sets were designed by the art director Erik Aaes.

== Cast ==
- Pierre Blanchar as Baron de Sigognac / Le capitaine Fracasse
- Lien Deyers as Isabelle
- Charles Boyer as Duc de Vallombreuse
- Daniel Mendaille as Agostin
- Pola Illéry as Chiquita
- Marie-Thérèse Vincent as Séraphine
- Odette Josylla as Zerbine
- Marguerite Moreno as Dame Léonarde
- Armand Numès as Blazius
- Paul Quevedo as Leander
- Paul Velsa as Matamore
- René Bergeron as Scapín
- Léon Courtois as Herode
- Georges Benoît
- Clairette de Savoye
- Alexandre Vargas

== Bibliography ==
- Klossner, Michael. The Europe of 1500-1815 on Film and Television: A Worldwide Filmography of Over 2550 Works, 1895 Through 2000. McFarland & Company, 2002.
