= Dante Cappelli =

Italian actor (1866–1948)

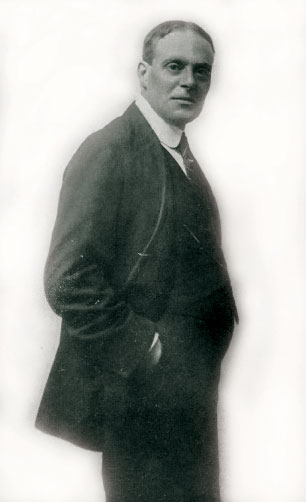
image of Dante Cappell

Dante Cappelli (6 January 1866 – 12 May 1948) was an Italian actor. He appeared in 71 films between 1909 and 1937.

He was born in Velletri, Italy and died in Rome.

== Selected filmography ==
- Carmen (1909) – Escamillo
- Macbeth (1909, Short) – Macbeth
- Amleto (1910) – Hamlet
- Tigris (1913)
- Romanticismo (1913)
- Anima perversa (1913)
- Love Everlasting (1914) – Granduke of Wallenstein
- Pepeniello (Napoli 1820) (1914)
- Pagine sparse (1914)
- Lo scrigno dei milioni (1914)
- La contessa Fedra (1914)
- L'eterno romanzo (1914)
- L'abete fulminato (1914)
- Il vampiro (1914)
- Il diritto di uccidere (1914)
- Extra-dry: Carnevale 1910 – Carnevale 1913 (1914)
- Colei che tutto soffre (1914)
- Cofanetto dei milioni (1914)
- Circe moderna (1914)
- Un dramma tra le belve (1915)
- Sul campo dell'onore (1915)
- La strega (1915)
- La maschera folle (1915)
- Beffa di Satana (1915)
- Amore che uccide (1916)
- ...e i rettili furono vinti! (1916)
- In mano del destino (1916)
- Il romanzo della morte (1916)
- Somiglianza funesta (1916)
- Buon Natale! (1916) ("Merry Christmas")
- L'uomo-Pappagallo (1917)
- Al di là della fede (1917)
- Battaglia per l'amore (1917)
- Come morì Butterfly (1917)
- Noblesse oblige (1918)
- Lagrime del popolo (1918)
- Il marito dell'amica (1919)
- La gibigianna (1919)
- Il medico delle pazze (1919)
- Dopo il perdono (1919)
- Centocelle (1919)
- L'amante della luna (1919)
- Cuor di ferro e cuor d'oro (1919)
- Cuori e caste (1919)
- La danza sull'abisso (1920)
- Non vendo mia figlia! (1920)
- Oro (1920)
- Biribì, il piccolo poliziotto torinese (1920)
- Supremo convegno (1920)
- I vagabondi dell'amore (1921)
- Il giro del mondo di un biricchino di Parigi (1921)
- Il delitto del commendatore (1921)
- Maddalena al deserto (1921)
- Tragedia di bambola (1922)
- Francesca da Rimini (1922)
- Lo strano viaggio di Pim-Popo (1922)
- La maschera che ride (1923)
- The Mysterious Mirror (1928) – Schloßkastellan
- Il treno delle 21,15 (1933)
- I due barbieri (1937) – (final film role)
