= Captain Fracasse (novel) =

1863 novel by Théophile Gautier

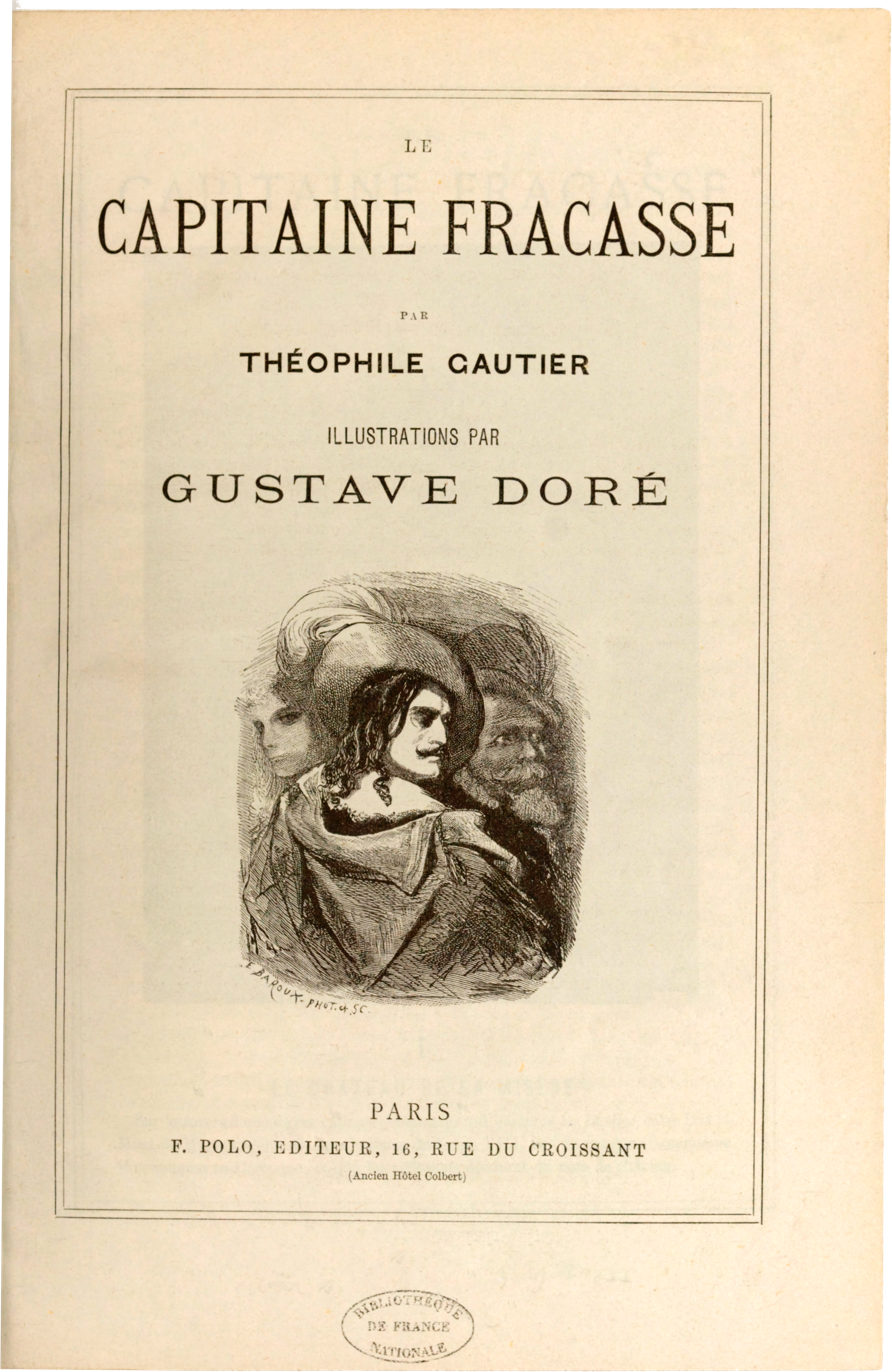
- Title page of the 1874 edition
- Author: Théophile Gautier
- Language: French
- Genre: Theatre-fiction
- Publication date: 1863
- Publication place: France
- Media type: Print

Captain Fracasse (French: Le Capitaine Fracasse) is an 1863 novel by the French writer Théophile Gautier. It is an adventure novel set in the seventeenth century. The story has been adapted for film and television numerous times. An 1866 edition of the novel was illustrated by Gustave Doré.

== Plot ==
The novel recounts the story of the baron of Sigognac during the reign of Louis XIII (reign 1610-1643), a destitute nobleman who decides to abandon his castle to join a theatrical troupe out of love for a young actress. Leaving his castle in the care of a faithful old steward, he travels with the actors to Paris; his aim being also to meet the king in Paris to ask for financial help in memory of services rendered by his ancestors. When one of the actors dies, the baron replaces him in the company's productions, taking the stage name of Captain Fracasse and, against his proud nature, acting the part of a bumbling military man. He develops humility through the experience, and this in turn deepens his loving relationship with the ingénue.

== Adaptations ==
List of film adaptations:

- Captain Fracasse (1919)
- Captain Fracasse (1929)
- Captain Fracasse (1940)
- Captain Fracasse (1943)
- Captain Fracasse (1961)
- Captain Fracassa's Journey (1990)

== Bibliography ==
- Goble, Alan. The Complete Index to Literary Sources in Film. Walter de Gruyter, 1 Jan 1999.
