= Captain Fracasse (1961 film) =

- Directed by: Pierre Gaspard-Huit
- Written by: Pierre Gaspard-Huit; Albert Vidalie
- Based on: Captain Fracasse by Théophile Gautier
- Produced by: Adolphe Osso
- Starring: Jean Marais; Geneviève Grad; Gérard Barray
- Cinematography: Marcel Grignon
- Edited by: Louisette Hautecoeur
- Music by: Georges Van Parys
- Production companies: Plazza Films; Metzer et Woog; Paris Élysées Films; Hoche Production
- Distributed by: Unidex; Constantin Film
- Release date: 21 April 1961 (France)
- Running time: 108 minutes
- Countries: France; Italy
- Language: French
- Box office: 3,152,121 admissions (France)

Captain Fracasse (French: Le Capitaine Fracasse, Italian: Capitan Fracassa) is a 1961 French-Italian historical adventure film written and directed by Pierre Gaspard-Huit and starring Jean Marais, Geneviève Grad and Gérard Barray. The scenario was based on the 1863 novel Captain Fracasse by Théophile Gautier. It was shot at the Epinay Studios in Paris and on location in the Forest of Rambouillet and the Château de Maintenon.

== Plot ==
In 17th-century France, Baron Philippe de Sigognac lives a modest life in his crumbling castle, the last scion of a noble lineage fallen into disrepair. One winter day, while out riding, he encounters a group of traveling actors whose wagon has broken down. Offering them hospitality, Sigognac is drawn to their world, especially to Isabelle, the ingénue of the troupe.

Despite the challenges of the road and the dangers they face, including skirmishes with highwaymen and the loss of one of their actors, Sigognac decides to join the troupe on their journey to Paris. Renaming himself "Captain Fracasse" and taking on a role in their performances, Sigognac finds himself increasingly enamored with Isabelle, who reciprocates his feelings.

However, their budding romance is threatened by the Duke of Vallombreuse, a cunning nobleman who also desires Isabelle. Vallombreuse, willing to resort to underhanded tactics, orchestrates various plots to eliminate Sigognac and claim Isabelle for himself.

Despite Vallombreuse's interference and the challenges they face, including attempts on Sigognac's life and Isabelle's abduction, the troupe perseveres. Eventually, it is revealed that Isabelle is the daughter of the Prince of Moussy, and her true noble heritage removes the obstacles to her union with Sigognac.

In the end, with Vallombreuse defeated and Isabelle's true identity recognized, Sigognac and Isabelle can finally marry and live happily ever after in Sigognac's restored castle, which transforms from a "Castle of Misfortune" to a "Castle of Happiness". Surrounded by their friends from the troupe, they embark on a new chapter of their lives together, leaving behind the trials and tribulations of their past.

== Cast ==
- Jean Marais as Baron Philippe de Sigognac, alias "Le Capitaine Fracasse"
- Geneviève Grad as Isabelle, an actress in the troupe
- Gérard Barray as Duke of Vallombreuse
- Louis de Funès as Scapin, an actor in the troupe
- Philippe Noiret as Hérode, the representative for the troupe of actors
- Jean Rochefort as Malartic
- Riccardo Garrone as Jaquemin Lampourde
- Anna Maria Ferrero as Marquise de Bruyères
- Robert Pizani as Blazius, an actor in the troupe
- Danielle Godet as Sérafina, an actress in the troupe
- Bernard Dhéran as Knight of Vidalenc
- Jacques Toja as an actor in the troupe
- Alain Saury as Agostin, the pitcher of knives
- Sacha Pitoeff as Matamore, an actor in the troupe
- Maurice Teynac as Marquis Édouard des Bruyères
- Jean Yonnel as Prince of Moussy
- Renée Passeur as Dame Léonarde, the duenna of the troupe
- Paul Préboist as a killed guard

== Bibliography ==
- Klossner, Michael. The Europe of 1500-1815 on Film and Television: A Worldwide Filmography of Over 2550 Works, 1895 Through 2000. McFarland & Company, 2002.
- Moine, Raphaëlle. Cinema Genre. John Wiley & Sons, 2009.
