= List of French actors =

This is a list of notable actors and actresses from France.

(Persons are listed alphabetically according to their surname.)

== A ==
- Carole Achache
- Kev Adams
- Isabelle Adjani
- Fatima Adoum
- Renée Adorée
- Anouk Aimée
- Madame Albert
- Catherine Allégret
- Béatrice Altariba
- Mathieu Amalric
- Aurélie Amblard
- Caroline Amiguet
- Annabella
- André Antoine
- Fanny Ardant
- Mhamed Arezki
- Arletty
- Swann Arlaud
- Françoise Arnoul
- Henri Attal
- Yvan Attal
- Jeanne Aubert
- Cécile Aubry
- Michel Auclair
- Stéphane Audran
- Claudine Auger
- Jean-Pierre Aumont
- Michel Aumont
- Daniel Auteuil
- Serge Avedikian

== B ==
- Édouard Baer
- Germaine Bailac
- Josiane Balasko
- Nicolas Anselme Baptiste
- Brigitte Bardot
- Olivier Baroux
- Jean-Louis Barrault
- Marie-Christine Barrault
- Gérard Barray
- Jeanne Julia Bartet
- Harry Baur
- Nathalie Baye
- Emmanuelle Béart
- Ramzy Bedia
- Loleh Bellon
- Frédérique Bel
- Annie Belle
- Yasmine Belmadi
- Jean-Paul Belmondo
- Jeanne Bérangère
- Éric Bernard
- Sarah Bernhardt
- Claude Berri
- Adam Bessa
- Suzanne Bianchetti
- Juliette Binoche
- Pierre Blaise
- Michel Blanc
- René Blancard
- Dominique Blanchar
- Pierre Blanchar
- Françoise Blanchard
- Bernard Blier
- Richard Bohringer
- Dany Boon
- Élodie Bouchez
- Pierre Boulanger
- Shaïn Boumedine
- Carole Bouquet
- Michel Bouquet
- Bourvil
- Jean-Pierre Bouyxou
- Angelique Boyer
- Charles Boyer
- Claude Brasseur
- Pierre Brasseur
- Jean Baptiste Prosper Bressant
- Jean-Claude Brialy
- Pierre Brice
- Martine Brochard
- Liina Brunelle

== C ==
- Laure Calamy
- Guillaume Canet
- Capucine
- Jean Carmet
- Martine Carol
- Leslie Caron
- Jean-Pierre Cassel
- Vincent Cassel
- Laetitia Casta
- Catherine Castel
- Marie-Pierre Castel
- Marie-Louise Cébron-Norbens
- Daniel Ceccaldi
- Alain Chabat
- Timothée Chalamet
- Marie Champmeslé
- Alexandre Charlet
- Maurice Chevalier
- Charles Chevillet
- François Civil
- Christian Clavier
- Aurore Clément
- Corinne Cléry
- François Cluzet
- Alice Cocéa
- Coluche
- Benoît-Constant Coquelin
- Ernest Alexandre Honoré Coquelin
- Stéphane Cornicard
- Clovis Cornillac
- Marion Cotillard
- Camille Cottin
- Clotilde Courau
- Darry Cowl
- Bruno Cremer
- René Cresté
- Valérie Crunchant

== D ==
- Béatrice Dalle
- Marie-Louise Damien
- Lili Damita
- Mireille Darc
- Colette Darfeuil
- Mireille Dargent
- Hélène Darly
- Gérard Darmon
- Danielle Darrieux
- Claude Dauphin
- Josette Day
- Jamel Debbouze
- Virginie Déjazet
- Rose Delaunay
- Raf De La Torre
- Suzy Delair
- Danièle Delorme
- Alain Delon
- Julie Delpy
- Anne Demerson
- Irina Demick
- Catherine Deneuve
- Lily-Rose Melody Depp
- Gérard Depardieu
- Guillaume Depardieu
- Jean Desailly
- Cyril Descours
- Patrick Dewaere
- Vernon Dobtcheff
- Françoise Dorléac
- Mélanie Doutey
- Julie Dreyfus
- Juliette Drouet
- Yvonne Dubel
- Joséphine Duchesnois
- Jean Dujardin
- Albert Dupontel
- Jacques Dutronc
- Nicolas Duvauchelle

== E ==
- Mehdi El Glaoui
- Jérémie Elkaïm
- Gad Elmaleh

== F ==
- Saturnin Fabre
- Erwan Kepoa Falé
- Renée Faure
- Charles Nicolas Favart
- Frédéric Febvre
- Fernandel
- Andréa Ferréol
- Edwige Feuillère
- Grégory Fitoussi
- Marina Fois
- Sara Forestier
- Brigitte Fossey
- Victor Francen
- Pierre Fresnay
- Malik Frikah
- Catherine Frot
- Louis de Funès

== G ==
- Jean Gabin
- Gabriel Gabrio
- Charlotte Gainsbourg
- Serge Gainsbourg
- Michel Galabru
- Jacques Gamblin
- Henri Garat
- Nicole Garcia
- Daniel Gélin
- Marin Gerrier
- Annie Girardot
- Bernard Giraudeau
- Judith Godrèche
- François Jules Edmond Got
- Fernand Gravey
- Juliette Gréco
- Eva Green
- Louise Grinberg
- Olivier Gruner
- Georges Guibourg
- Lucien Germain Guitry
- Sacha Guitry
- Paul Gury

== H ==
- Jane Hading
- Adèle Haenel
- Johnny Hallyday
- Rebecca Hampton
- Françoise Hardy
- Serge Hazanavicius
- Catherine Hessling
- Cécilia Hornus
- Isabelle Huppert

== I ==
- Eva Ionesco (born 1965)

== J ==
- Catherine Jacob
- Irène Jacob
- Claude Jade
- Joséphine Japy
- Marlène Jobert
- Philippe Joly
- Louis Jourdan
- Louis Jouvet
- Odette Joyeux
- Eric Judor
- Gérard Jugnot
- Sandra Julien

== K ==
- Valérie Kaprisky
- Valérie Karsenti
- Tchéky Karyo
- Mathieu Kassovitz
- Salim Kechiouche
- Reem Kherici
- Lyna Khoudri
- Véra Korène

== L ==
- Louise Labèque
- Nans Laborde-Jourdàa
- Dominique Laffin
- Christopher Lambert
- Robert Lamoureux
- Gérard Lanvin
- Michèle Laroque
- Elise Larnicol
- Gérald Laroche
- Pierre Larquey
- Chantal Lauby
- Mélanie Laurent
- Samuel Le Bihan
- Jean-Pierre Léaud
- Ginette Leclerc
- Jacques Lecoq
- Adrienne Lecouvreur
- Virginie Ledoyen
- Jean Lefebvre
- Gilles Lellouche
- Valérie Lemercier
- Adélaïde Leroux
- Côme Levin
- Thierry Lhermitte
- Max Linder
- Vincent Lindon
- Michael Lonsdale
- Sylvia Lopez
- Fabrice Luchini
- Lugné-Poe

== M ==
- Benoît Magimel
- Jean Marais
- André Maranne
- Marcel Marceau
- Sophie Marceau
- Georges Marchal
- Guy Marchand
- Janie Marèse
- Ali Marhyar
- Jean-Pierre Marielle
- Frédéric Mariotti
- Pierre-François Martin-Laval
- Olivier Martinez
- Nicolas Maury
- Mathilda May
- Andrée Mégard
- Étienne Mélingue
- Gilbert Melki
- Daniel Mendaille
- Denis Ménochet
- Kad Merad
- Claude Mérelle
- Roxane Mesquida
- Paul Meurisse
- Patrick Mille [fr]
- Bernard Minet
- Pierre Mondy
- Yves Montand
- Jeanne Moreau
- Michèle Morgan
- Gaby Morlay
- Jean Mounet-Sully
- Musidora
- Francine Mussey

== N ==
- Samy Naceri
- Stéphane Neville
- Magali Noël
- Noël-Noël
- Philippe Noiret
- Paulette Noizeux
- France Nuyen

== O ==
- Bulle Ogier
- Pascale Ogier
- Denis Ostier
- Madeleine Ozeray

== P ==
- Clara Pacini
- Hervé Paillet
- Pierre Palmade
- Vanessa Paradis
- Rod Paradot
- Anne Parillaud
- Marie-Georges Pascal
- Raymond Pellegrin
- François Périer
- Léonce Perret
- Nathalie Perrey
- Francis Perrin
- Jacques Perrin
- Jean Peyrière
- Gérard Philipe
- Michel Piccoli
- Roger Pierre
- Dominique Pinon
- Marie-France Pisier
- Elvire Popesco
- Georges Poujouly
- Melvil Poupaud
- Perrette Pradier
- Albert Préjean
- Micheline Presle
- Yvonne Printemps
- Wojciech Pszoniak
- Bruno Putzulu

== R ==
- Pierre-Loup Rajot
- Blanche Ravalec
- Camille Razat
- Serge Reggiani
- Suzanne Reichenberg
- Gabrielle Réjane
- Simone Renant
- Madeleine Renaud
- Jean Reno
- Pierre Renoir
- Hortense Rhéa
- Claude Rich
- Jean Richard
- Pierre Richard
- Pierre Richard-Willm
- Stéphane Rideau
- Emmanuelle Riva
- Dany Robin
- Gabrielle Robinne
- Madeleine Roch
- Jean Rochefort
- Sebastian Roché
- Sonia Rolland
- Viviane Romance
- Béatrice Romand
- Maurice Ronet
- Raymond Rouleau
- Jean-Paul Rouve
- Benoît Régent
- Gabrielle Réjane
- Noël Roquevert

== S ==
- Ludivine Sagnier
- Renée Saint-Cyr
- Xavier Saint-Macary
- Maria Schneider
- Romy Schneider
- Emmanuelle Seigner
- Mathilde Seigner
- Michel Serrault
- Jean Servais
- Léa Seydoux
- Delphine Seyrig
- Clément Sibony
- Simone Signoret
- Michel Simon
- Simone Simon
- Valérie Simonin
- Sam Spiegel
- Dimitri Storoge
- Omar Sy

== T ==
- Jacques Tati
- Audrey Tautou
- Sylvie Testud
- Zelia Trebelli-Bettini
- Jean-Louis Trintignant
- Marie Trintignant
- François Truffaut

== U ==
- Gaspard Ulliel

== V ==
- Christian Vadim
- Charles Vanel
- Michael Vartan
- Paul Vermoyal
- Henri Vidal
- Hervé Villechaize
- Jacques Villeret
- Pascal Vincent
- Marthe Vinot
- Maurice Vinot
- Marina Vlady

== W ==
- Mallory Wanecque
- Aurélien Wiik
- Catherine Wilkening
- Lambert Wilson

== Y ==
- Hichem Yacoubi
- Jean Yanne
- Jean d'Yd
- Jean Yonnel
- Wladimir Yordanoff
- Michaël Youn
- Elodie Yung

== Z ==
- Jacques Zabor
- Dominique Zardi
- Roschdy Zem
- Malik Zidi
- Pierre Zimmer

== See also ==
- Category:Film by year
- List of years in film
- List of French people
- List of German actors
