= Louise Lagrange =

French actress (1898–1979)

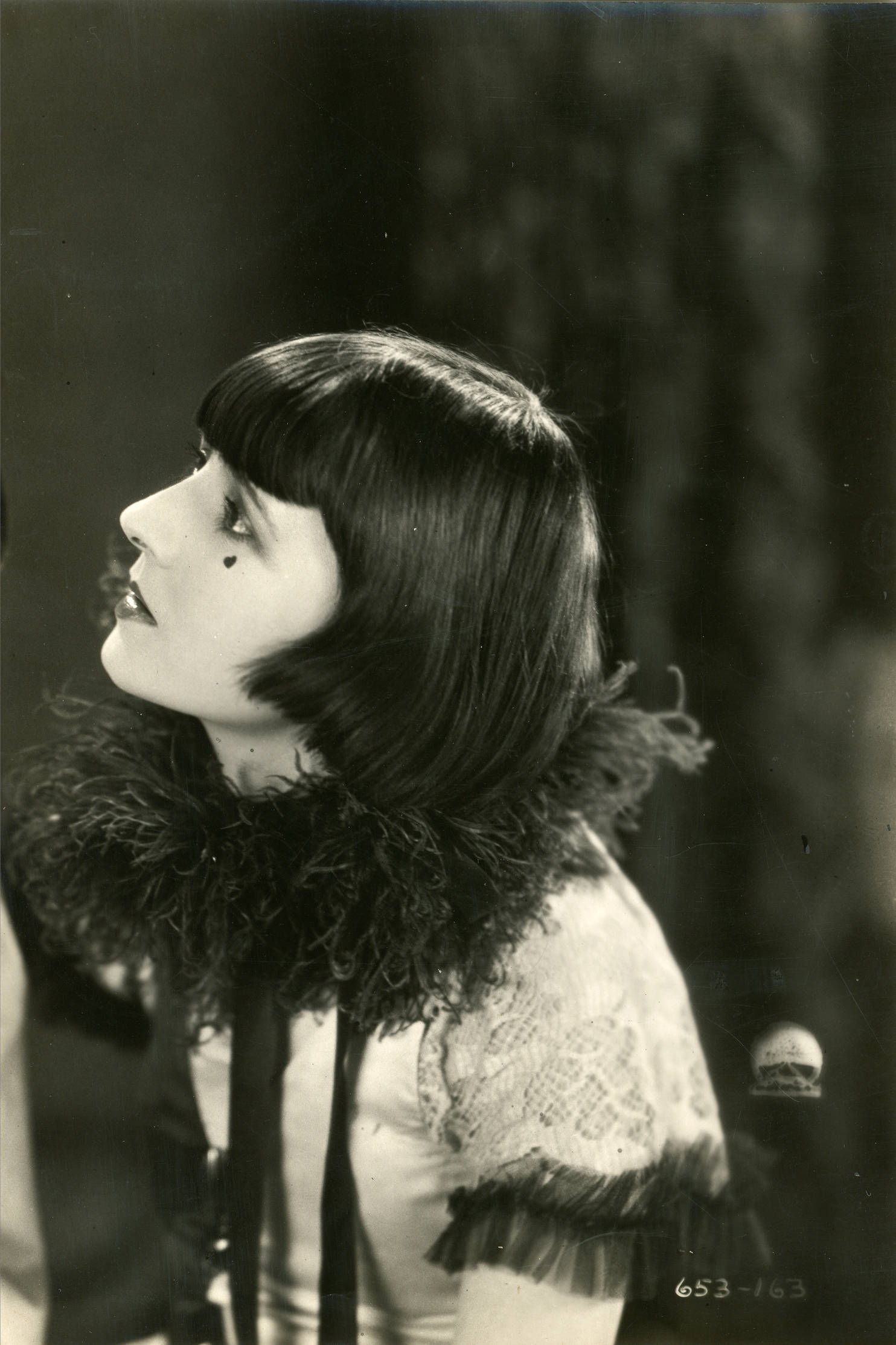
- Louise Lagrange in The Side Show of Life (1924)
- Born: Louise Marie Lagrange; 19 August 1898; Oran, French Algeria
- Died: 28 February 1979 (aged 80); Paris, France
- Other name: Louise Vinot
- Occupation: Actress
- Years active: 1907–1951 (film)
- Spouse(s): Maurice Tourneur; William Elliot
- Relatives: Marthe Vinot (sister); Maurice Vinot (brother-in-law); Pierre Blanchar (brother-in-law); Dominique Blanchar (niece)

Louise Lagrange (French pronunciation: [lwiz laɡʁɑ̃ʒ]; 19 August 1898 – 28 February 1979) was a French film actress.

Lagrange was born in Oran, French Algeria, and had a film career spanning from 1907 through 1951. Beginning her career as a child actor before the First World War, she appeared in French and American films, and was in the serial Les Vampires (1915–1916). She wed twice, with her first marriage to the film director Maurice Tourneur and the second to stage performer William Elliot.

Her sister was fellow actress Marthe Vinot, married first to Maurice Vinot and then to Pierre Blanchar and mother of Dominique Blanchar.

She died in Paris in 1979.

== Partial filmography ==
- A Roman Orgy (1911)
- Cinderella or the Glass Slipper (1913)
- Les Vampires (1915-1916)
- The Side Show of Life (1924)
- A Sainted Devil (1924)
- The Nude Woman (1926)
- The Orchid Dancer (1928)
- In the Shadow of the Harem (1928)
- The Wedding March (1929)
- The Night Is Ours (1930)
- The Little Escapade (1931)
- Judex (1934)
- Cage of Girls (1949)

== Bibliography ==
- Goble, Alan. The Complete Index to Literary Sources in Film. Walter de Gruyter, 1999.
