= Blanchar =

Blanchar is a surname. Notable people with the surname include:

- Dominique Blanchar (1927–2018), French actress
- Pierre Blanchar (1892–1963), French actor
- Renée Blanchar (born 1964), Canadian documentary filmmaker and screenwriter
