= The Nude Woman =

The Nude Woman may refer to:

- The Nude Woman (1922 film), an Italian silent drama film
- The Nude Woman (1926 film), a French silent drama film
- The Nude Woman (1932 film), a French drama film
- The Nude Woman (1949 film), a French drama film
