= Vinot =

Vinot (English: /vɪˈnoʊ/, French: [vino]) may refer to:

== People ==
- Marthe Vinot (1894–1974), French actress
- Maurice Vinot (1888–1916), French film actor

== Other uses ==
- Vinot-Deguingand, French automobile producer
