= Cinderella or the Glass Slipper =

- Directed by: Georges Méliès
- Based on: "Cinderella" by Charles Perrault
- Produced by: Charles Pathé
- Edited by: Ferdinand Zecca
- Production company: Star Film Company
- Distributed by: Pathé Frères
- Release date: 3 January 1913 (France)
- Country: France
- Language: Silent

Cinderella or the Glass Slipper (French: Cendrillon ou la Pantoufle merveilleuse) is a 1913 French silent film directed by Georges Méliès, based on the fairy tale by Charles Perrault.

== Production ==
Méliès had previously adapted Cinderella thirteen years earlier, in an 1899 film which had been his first big success. The 1913 Cinderella can be considered a remake of the earlier film, but both are derived from the original Perrault tale.

The film was made in the summer and autumn of 1912. Méliès himself plays the Prince's messenger who searches for the owner of the glass slipper. His daughter, Georgette Méliès, was likely one of the two camera operators (each of Méliès's films from 1902 onward was shot with two cameras simultaneously for international distribution).

Louise Lagrange, who would later appear in many French and Hollywood films, plays one of Cinderella's sisters. In a conversation with the writers of a Centre national du cinéma publication, Essai de reconstitution du catalogue français de la Star-Film, she recalled Méliès's kindness and courtesy, as well as his meticulous diligence during the filming of special effects sequences. Lagrange's sister Marthe Vinot is believed to be in the film as well, in an unidentified role. Prince Charming is also played by an actress. For the scene in which the court searches for the slipper's owner, Méliès reused a town-square set that had previously appeared in his 1906 film Robert Macaire and Bertrand. Special effects in the film were created using stage machinery, dissolves, and substitution splices.

Like all of the other films Méliès made in 1911 and 1912, Cinderella was made under the supervision of Charles Pathé for his studio Pathé Frères. After receiving Méliès's work, Pathé authorized the filmmaker Ferdinand Zecca to edit it. Zecca cut the film down—reportedly to half the length Méliès intended—and is also probably responsible for adding the cross-cutting effects and medium shots seen in the film, as these devices are highly unusual in Méliès's style.

In 1944, Méliès's widow Jehanne d'Alcy claimed to the Cinémathèque française that Zecca had "massacred" the film, cutting out the best scenes, including one in which pumpkins race each other across a garden. D'Alcy asserted that the editing was sabotage intended to ruin Méliès's career. This charge against Zecca was never proven, though the abrupt linear edits do suggest that Zecca's work extended to a reedit of the entire film.

== Release and reception ==
According to advertisements published in December 1912, the film scheduled for release on 3 January 1913. It was advertised as a féerie en 2 parties et 30 tableaux, d'après le chef-d'œuvre de Charles Perrault. In sharp contrast to Méliès's 1899 version, the 1913 film was not a success with audiences and exhibitors, at least in part because Méliès's theatrical style had fallen out of fashion in the intervening years.

In a 1979 book on Méliès, film scholar John Frazer commented that although Zecca's interference can clearly be discerned, "the remaining film is an agreeable example of Méliès's art with a few particularly fine effects." In a 2010 book on fairy-tale films, folklorist Jack Zipes criticized the film for leaning too heavily into melodrama and special effects, leading to some "boring scenes that had little comic relief", but also cited numerous features of interest, including the dramatic treatment of the stepsisters' abuse of Cinderella, the fairies' transformations, and elaborate business involving the glass slipper.

Of the two original edited negatives produced for the film, one survives in the collection of the Cinémathèque Française. When the Cinémathèque began a 2013–2021 initiative to make digital restorations of 33 Méliès films in its collection, Cinderella was among the titles given top priority; in collaboration with the Fondation Jérôme Seydoux-Pathé, the Cinémathèque also commissioned the composer Lawrence Lehérissey to record a new piano score for the restoration.
