= The Nude Woman (1932 film) =

1932 film

- Directed by: Jean-Paul Paulin
- Written by: Henry Bataille (play); Léopold Marchand
- Produced by: Frank Clifford
- Starring: Florelle; Raymond Rouleau; Constant Rémy
- Cinematography: Léonce-Henri Burel
- Music by: Gabriel Chaumette; Gaston Gabaroche
- Production company: P.A.D.
- Distributed by: Films Sonores Tobis
- Release date: 21 October 1932
- Running time: 91 minutes
- Country: France
- Language: French

The Nude Woman (French: La Femme nue) is a 1932 French drama film directed by Jean-Paul Paulin and starring Florelle, Raymond Rouleau and Constant Rémy. The film is based on a play by Henry Bataille which has been adapted on several occasions. The fim is Paulin's directorial debut and a remake of the film by Léonce Perret, released in 1926 (The Nude Woman).

The film's sets were designed by Lazare Meerson.

== Cast ==
- Florelle as Lolette
- Raymond Rouleau as Pierre Bernier
- Constant Rémy as Jean Rouchard
- Armand Bour as Prince de Chabran
- Maxime Fabert as Tabourot
- Alice Field as Princesse de Chabran
- Marcel de Garcin as Gréville
- Paul Clerget as Garzini
- Odette Talazac as Mme. Garzin
- Robert Charlet
- Lucy Clorival
- Fanny Lacroix
- Louis Merlac

== See also ==
- The Naked Truth (1914)
- The Nude Woman (1922)
- The Nude Woman (1926)
