= Slightly Scarlet =

Slightly Scarlet may refer to:

- Slightly Scarlet (1930 film), a film starring Evelyn Brent
- Slightly Scarlet (1956 film), a film noir starring John Payne
