= Paolo Reni =

Italian art director

- Occupation: Art director
- Years active: 1930-1945

Paolo Reni was an Italian art director.

== Selected filmography ==
- The Doctor's Secret (1931)
- Television (1931)
- Queen of the Night (1931)
- A Woman Has Fallen (1941)

== Bibliography ==
- Waldman, Harry. Missing Reels: Lost Films of American and European Cinema. McFarland, 2000.
