= Those Three French Girls =

1930 film

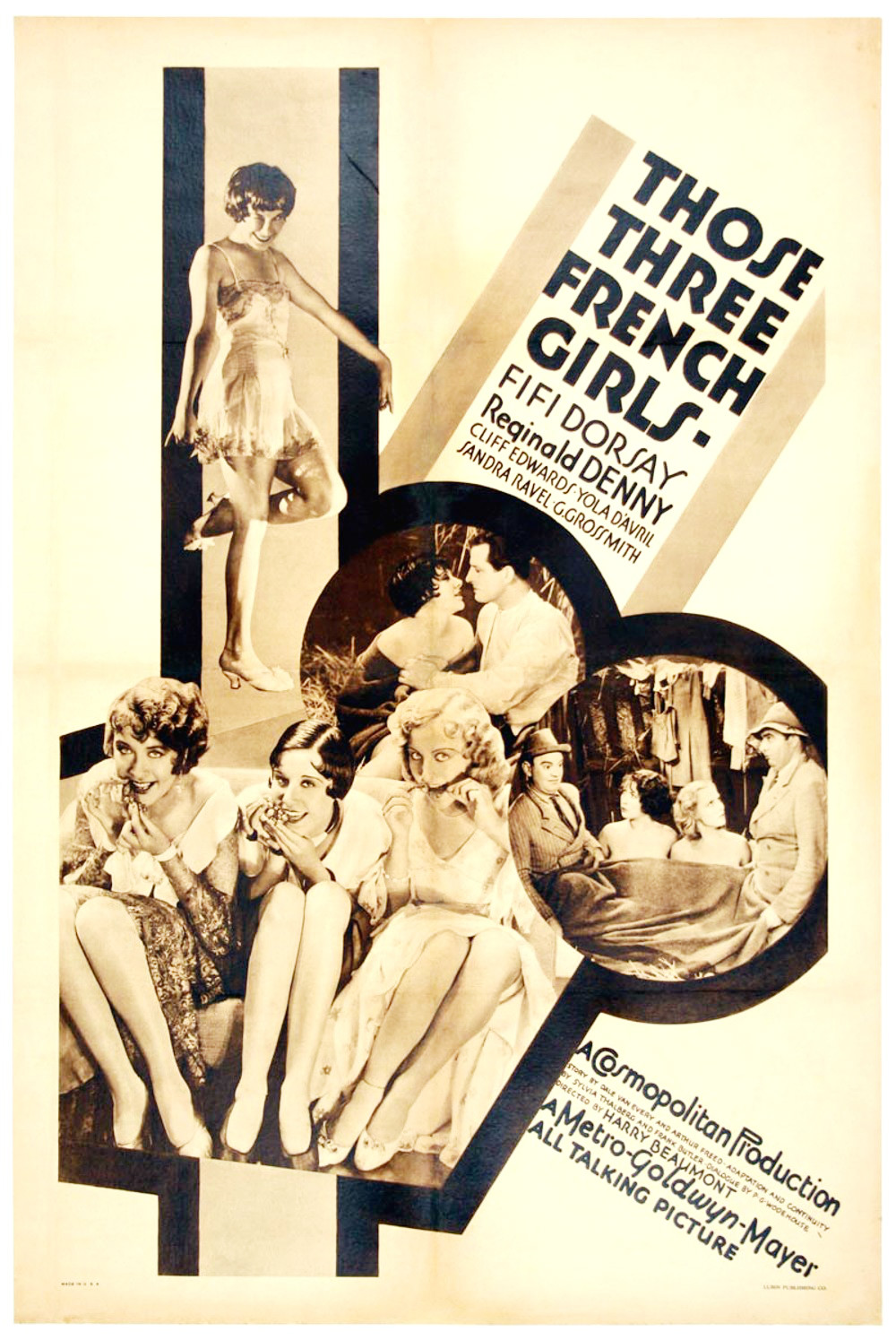
- Those Three French Girls (1930)
- Directed by: Harry Beaumont
- Written by: Sylvia Thalberg (adaptation and continuity); Frank Butler (adaptation and continuity); P. G. Wodehouse (dialogue)
- Story by: Dale Van Every; Arthur Freed
- Starring: Fifi D'Orsay
- Cinematography: Merritt B. Gerstad
- Edited by: George Hively
- Production company: Cosmopolitan Productions
- Distributed by: Metro-Goldwyn-Mayer
- Release date: October 11, 1930
- Running time: 73 minutes
- Country: United States
- Language: English

Those Three French Girls is a 1930 American Pre-Code comedy film directed by Harry Beaumont and starring Fifi D'Orsay, Reginald Denny, and Cliff Edwards. The dialogue was written by P. G. Wodehouse.

== Plot ==
While on holiday in a small French town, an Englishman encounters three French women and two American men.

== Cast ==
- Fifi D'Orsay as Charmaine
- Reginald Denny as Larry Winthrop
- Cliff Edwards as Owly Owen
- Yola d'Avril as Diane
- Sandra Ravel as Madelon
- George Grossmith, Jr. as Earl of Ippleton
- Edward Brophy as Yank Dugan
- Peter Gawthorne as Parker - the Butler
