= Paradise (1932 film) =

1932 film

- Directed by: Guido Brignone
- Written by: Luigi Bonelli; Alessandro De Stefani
- Starring: Nino Besozzi; Sandra Ravel; Lamberto Picasso
- Cinematography: Ubaldo Arata
- Edited by: Guido Brignone; Giorgio Simonelli
- Music by: Luigi Colacicchi
- Production company: Società Italiana Cines
- Distributed by: Società Italiana Cines
- Release date: 1932
- Running time: 64 minutes
- Country: Italy
- Language: Italian

Paradise (Italian: Paradiso) is a 1932 Italian comedy film directed by Guido Brignone and starring Nino Besozzi, Sandra Ravel and Lamberto Picasso. It was part of a group of "White Telephone" films made during the decade. It was produced by Cines, the largest Italian film studio at the time.

== Cast ==
- Nino Besozzi as Max
- Sandra Ravel as Eva
- Lamberto Picasso as Il prestigiatore
- Calisto Bertramo as Il presidente della società zoofila
- Olga Capri as Una congressista
- Pio Campa
- Giuseppe Pierozzi
- Giacomo Almirante
- Oreste Bilancia
- Alfredo Martinelli
- Giacomo Moschini
- Turi Pandinolfi
- Roberto Pasetti
- Alfredo Robert
- Carlo Simoneschi
- Gino Viotti

== Bibliography ==
- Wheeler Winston Dixon & Gwendolyn Audrey Foster. A Short History of Film. Rutgers University Press, 2008.
