= De Sensatie van de Toekomst =

1931 Dutch film

- Directed by: Dimitri Buchowetzki and Jack Salvatori
- Written by: Howard Irving Young (play)
- Distributed by: Paramount Pictures
- Release date: 9 October 1931
- Running time: 65 minutes
- Country: Netherlands
- Language: Dutch

De Sensatie van de Toekomst (1931) is a Dutch film directed by Dimitri Buchowetzki and Jack Salvatori, released by Paramount Pictures, and based on the play Television by Howard Irving Young (1893–1952).

This film was also released by Paramount in French (Magie moderne), Italian (Televisione), Swedish (Trådlöst och kärleksfullt), Polish (Świat bez granic), Czech (Svet bez hranic), and Romanian (Televiziune) versions.

== Cast ==
- Dolly Bouwmeester
- Roland Varno
- Marie van Westerhoven
- Charles Braakensiek
- Johan Boskamp
- Hans Braakensiek
- Jack Salvatori

== See also ==
- Dutch films of the 1930s
