= Together in the Dark =

- Directed by: Gennaro Righelli
- Written by: Alessandro De Stefani
- Produced by: Carlo José Bassoli
- Starring: Sandra Ravel; Maurizio D'Ancora; Lamberto Picasso
- Cinematography: Ubaldo Arata
- Edited by: Guy Simon
- Music by: Cesare Celani
- Production company: Società Italiana Cines
- Distributed by: Cinès-Pittaluga
- Release date: 1933
- Running time: 88 minutes
- Country: Italy
- Language: Italian

Together in the Dark (Italian: Al buio insieme) is a 1933 Italian comedy film directed by Gennaro Righelli and starring Sandra Ravel, Maurizio D'Ancora and Lamberto Picasso.

The film's sets were designed by the art director Gastone Medin.

== Cast ==
- Sandra Ravel as Clara
- Maurizio D'Ancora as Carlo
- Lamberto Picasso as Impresario
- Olga Vittoria Gentilli as Zia
- Romolo Costa as segretario di Taiti
- Giuseppe Pierozzi as Il barista
- Carlo Ranieri as il cliente di un hotel
- Amedeo Giovacchini

== Bibliography ==
- Mancini, Elaine. Struggles of the Italian Film Industry During Fascism, 1930-1935. UMI Research Press, 1985.
