= Isa Miranda =

Italian actress (1905–1982)

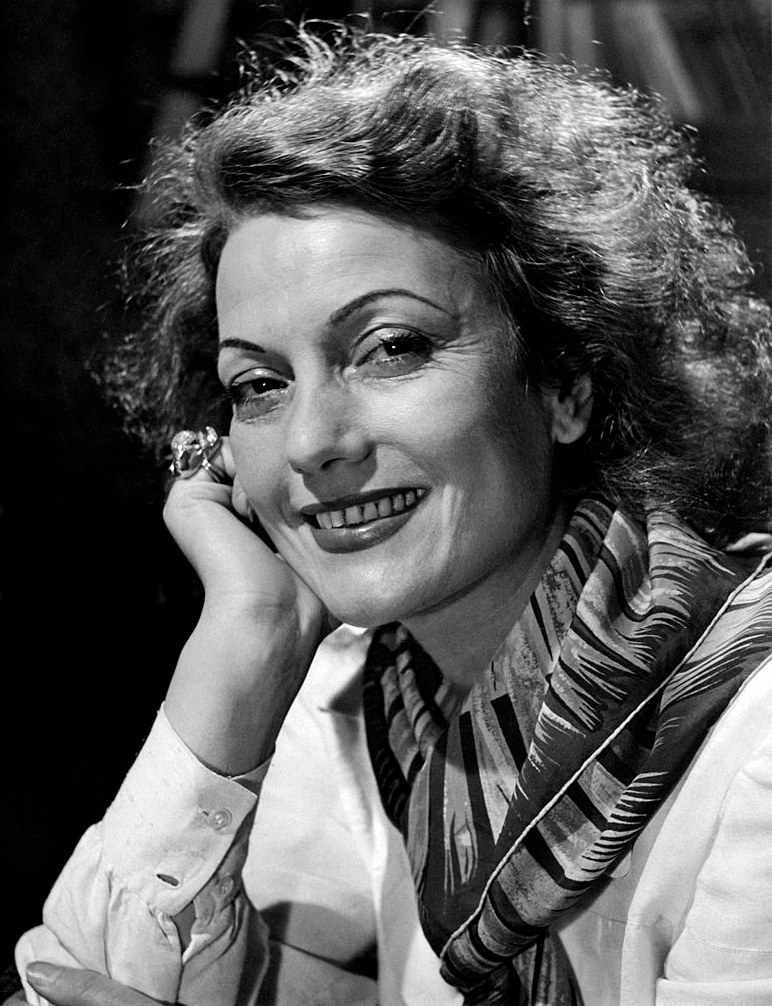
- Miranda in 1950s
- Born: Ines Isabella Sampietro; 5 July 1905; Milan, Kingdom of Italy
- Died: 8 July 1982 (aged 77); Rome, Italy
- Occupation: Actress
- Years active: 1933–1978
- Spouse: Alfredo Guarini (m. 1939; died 1981)

Isa Miranda (born Ines Isabella Sampietro; 5 July 1905 – 8 July 1982) was an Italian actress with an international film career.

== Biography ==
Miranda was born Ines Isabella Sampietro in Milan, the daughter of a street car conductor. When she was 10 years old, she began working as an errand girl for a dressmaker. She later had jobs in a box factory and a handbag factory. When she was 15, she became a model, a job that provided enough income for her to learn bookkeeping and typing in night school. She worked as a typist while attending the Accademia dei Filodrammatici in Milan and trained as a stage actress. She went on to play bit parts in Italian films in Rome. She changed her name to Isa Miranda and success came with Max Ophüls' film La Signora di tutti (Everybody's Woman; 1934) in which she played Gaby Doriot, a famous film star and adventuress with whom men cannot help falling in love. This performance brought in its wake several film offers and a Hollywood contract with Paramount Pictures. There, billed as the "Italian Marlene Dietrich", she played femme fatale roles in films such as Hotel Imperial (1939) and Adventure in Diamonds (1940).

She returned to Italy soon after the outbreak of World War II and continued to act on stage and to make films. In 1949, she starred in René Clément's The Walls of Malapaga, which won an Academy Award for the most outstanding foreign language film of 1950, and for Miranda, the Palme d'Or at the Cannes Film Festival. Another success of that period was La Ronde (1950), also directed by Ophüls.

Her career took her to France, Germany and Britain, where she frequently appeared in TV films, including The Avengers. Other notable film appearances included Siamo donne (1953), a portmanteau film, in which Miranda shared the screen with Anna Magnani, Alida Valli and Ingrid Bergman; Summertime (1955), starring Katharine Hepburn; Gli Sbandati (1955); The Yellow Rolls-Royce (1964); The Shoes of the Fisherman (1968); and Liliana Cavani's The Night Porter (1974).

Miranda was married to the Italian director and producer Alfredo Guarini until his death in 1981. She died in Rome on 8 July 1982.

== Selected filmography ==
=== Features ===
Year	Title	Role	Notes
1933	The Haller Case	Badwoman	
1934	Cardinal Lambertini	Anna	
1934	Everybody's Woman	Gabriella Murge, alias Gaby Doriot	
1934	Tenebre	Vera	
1934	Creatures of the Night	Una gigolette	
1935	Red Passport	Maria Brunetti	
1935	Like the Leaves	Irene "Nennele" Rosani	
1936	The Love of the Maharaja	Mira Salviati	
1936	A Woman Between Two Worlds	Mina Salviati	
1936	Thou Art My Joy	Mary Hofer & Bianca Monti	
1937	The Man from Nowhere	Louise Paléari	
1937	The Former Mattia Pascal	Luisa Paleari	
1937	Scipio Africanus: The Defeat of Hannibal	Velia, a Roman woman	
1937	The Lie of Nina Petrovna	Nina Petrovna	
1938	Like the Leaves	Nennele	
1939	Hotel Imperial	Anna Warschawska	
1940	Adventure in Diamonds	Felice Falcon	
1940	Senza cielo	Regina	
1941	A Woman Has Fallen	Dina	
1942	Document Z-3	Sandra Morini	
1942	Malombra	Marina di Malombra	
1944	Zazà	Zazà	
1945	La carne e l'anima	Katrin detta "Stella"	
1945	My Widow and I	Maria, sua moglie	
1948	L'aventure commence demain	Clarence Holbane	
1949	The Walls of Malapaga	Marta Manfredini	
1950	I'm in the Revue	Isa	
1950	Pact with the Devil	Marta Larocca	
1950	La Ronde	Charlotte, the Actress	
1951	Cameriera bella presenza offresi...	Angela Leonardi	
1952	The Seven Deadly Sins	Mme Alvaro	Segment "Avarice and Anger"
1952	Gli uomini non guardano il cielo	The countess	
1953	We, the Women	Isa	Segment "Isa Miranda"
1954	Before the Deluge	Madame Françoise Boussard	
1954	The Secret of Helene Marimon	Hélène Marimon	
1954	Rasputin	La tsarine Alexandra	
1955	Summertime	Signora Fiorini	
1955	The Abandoned	Contessa Luisa	
1955	Rommel's Treasure	Mrs. Fischer	
1956	I pinguini ci guardano		
1957	I colpevoli	Lucia Rossello	
1957	Arrivano i dollari!	Caterina Marchetti	
1957	A Kiss for a Killer	Betty Farnwell	
1959	Le secret du Chevalier d'Éon	La tzarine Elisabeth Petrovna	
1963	Corruption	Signora Mattoli	
1963	The Empty Canvas	Cecilia's Mother	
1964	Hardi Pardaillan!	Catherine de Medicis	
1964	Dog Eat Dog	Madame Benoit	
1964	Do You Know This Voice?	Mrs. Marotta	
1964	The Yellow Rolls-Royce	Duchesse d'Angoulême	
1964	Una storia di notte	Peppino's wife	
1966	Un monde nouveau	Une sage-femme	
1967	Hell Is Empty	Isa Grant	
1968	Darling Caroline	La duchesse de Bussez	
1968	The Shoes of the Fisherman	The Marchesa	
1969	L'assoluto naturale	Mother	
1969	La donna a una dimensione	Elena	
1970	The Syndicate: A Death in the Family	Tenutaria bordello	
1970	Dorian Gray	Mrs. Ruxton	
1970	Roy Colt and Winchester Jack	Mammola / Violet	
1970	Un estate con sentimento	Sue's Mother	
1971	Marta	Elena	
1971	A Bay of Blood	Countess Federica Donati	
1972	Lo chiameremo Andrea	Teacher	
1974	The Night Porter	Countess Stein	
1974	I'll Take Her Like a Father	Lorè	
1977	La lunga strada senza polvere	The wife	
1982	Apocalisse di un terremoto	Madre di Ciro	Final film role
