= Alfredo Robert =

Italian actor and film director

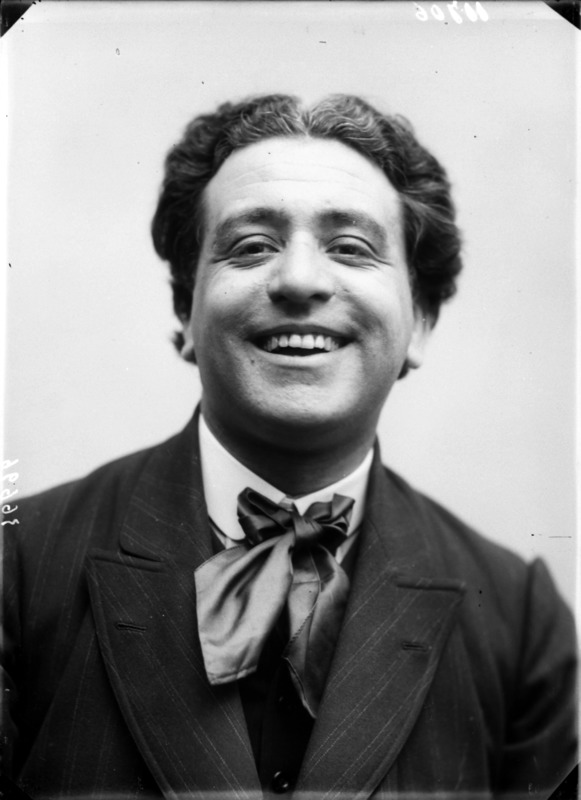
- Italian actor and film director
- Born: 5 April 1877; Fucecchio, Tuscany, Italy
- Died: 31 March 1964 (aged 86); Bologna, Emilia-Romagna, Italy
- Occupations: Actor, Director
- Years active: 1911–1950

Alfredo Robert (1877–1964) was an Italian actor and film director.

== Selected filmography ==
- Il sire di Vincigliata (1913)
- The Doctor's Secret (1931)
- Paradise (1932)
- Doctor Antonio (1937)
- Pietro Micca (1938)
- It Always Ends That Way (1939)
- The King of England Will Not Pay (1941)
- Don Cesare di Bazan (1942)
- Pact with the Devil (1950)

== Bibliography ==
- Waldman, Harry. Missing Reels: Lost Films of American and European Cinema. McFarland, 2000.
