= A Roman Orgy =

- L'orgie romaine
- Release date: 1911
- Country: France

A Roman Orgy (French: L'orgie romaine), also known as Heliogabalus (French: Héliogabale), is a 1911 French short historical drama film directed by Louis Feuillade for Société des Etablissements L. Gaumont. It features Jean Aymé as the lecherous Emperor Elagabalus (Heliogabalus) who sets a pride of lions on an unfortunate slave. It also stars Louise Lagrange, Luitz-Morat, Renée Carl, Edmond Bréon, and Léonce Perret. The film was released on 24 November 1911. The Dutch Film Museum has a copy of the film.
