= Anne Demerson =

French actress (1786–1872)

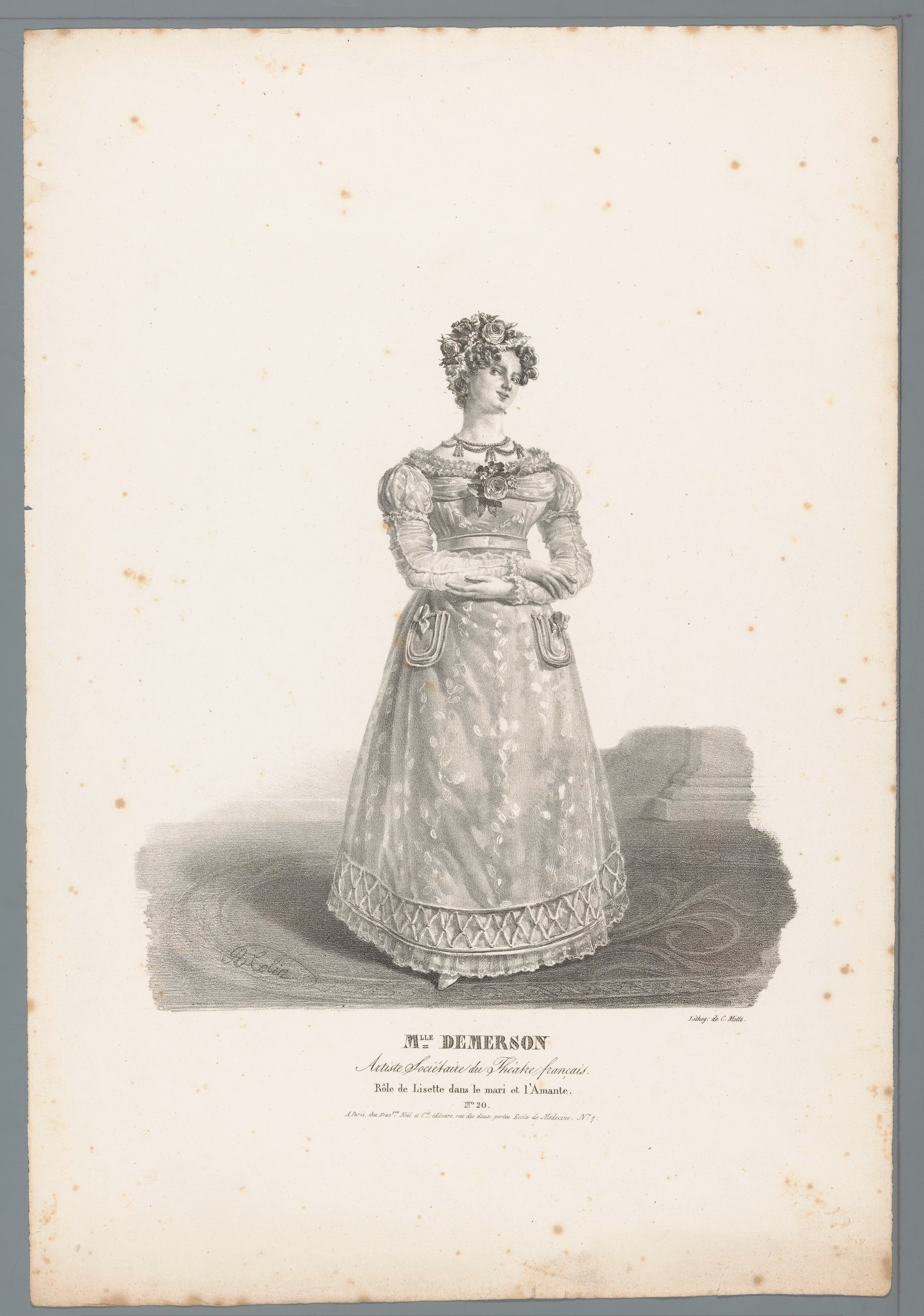
Anee Demerson as Lisette in Le Mari et l'Amant

Anne Demerson was a French actress born on April 17, 1786, in Marbéville and died on November 16, 1872, in Villiers-sur-Loir. She was a sociétaire of the Comédie-Française from 1813 to 1830. Throughout her career, she performed in numerous plays, including roles in Tartuffe by Molière and Le Mari et l'Amant by Jean-Baptiste Vial.
