= Henry Bataille =

French writer

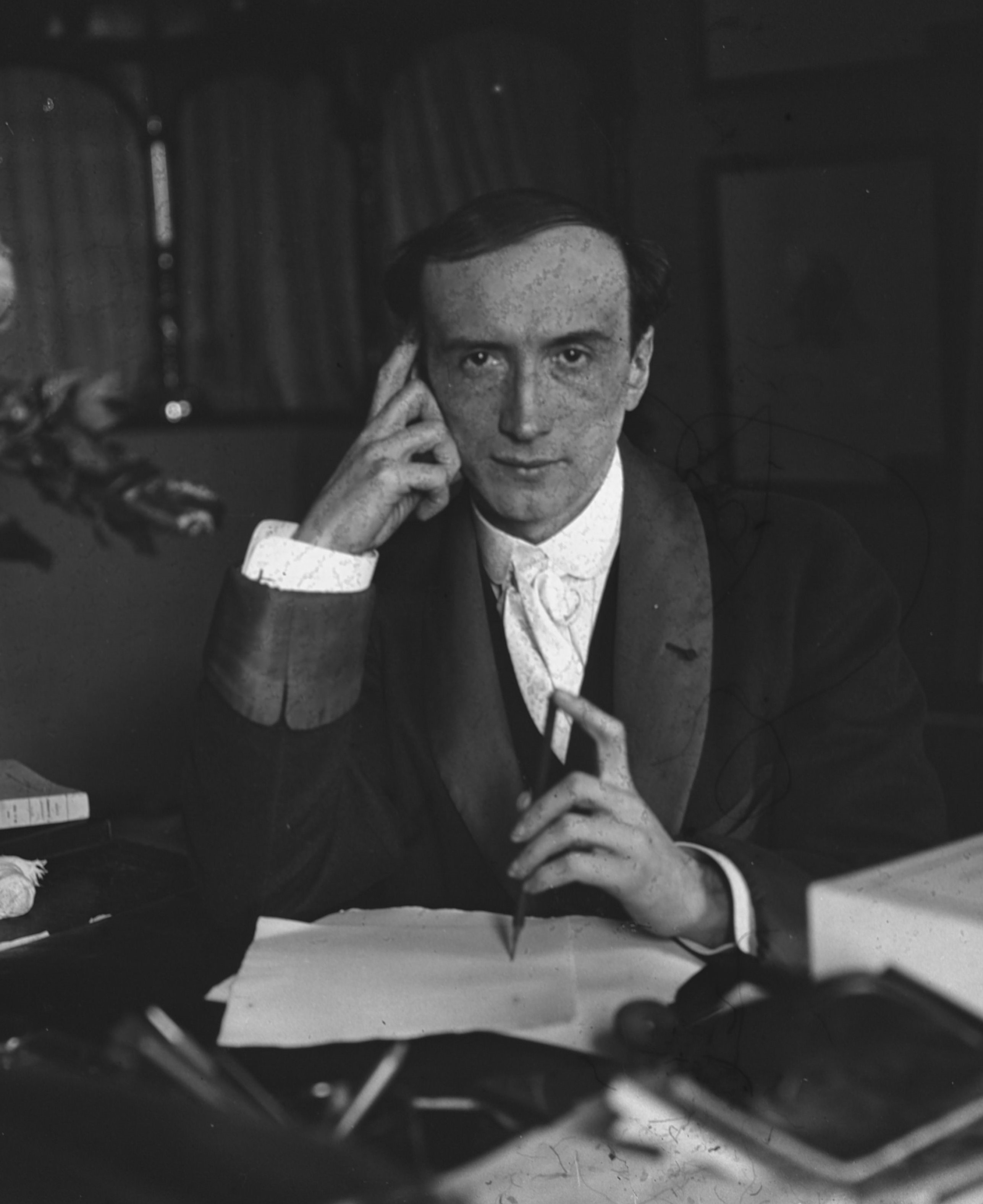
- Henry Bataille in 1911
- Born: Félix-Henri Bataille; 4 April 1872; Nîmes, French Third Republic
- Died: 2 March 1922 (aged 49); Rueil-Malmaison, Yvelines, French Third Republic
- Education: École des Beaux-Arts; Académie Julian
- Occupations: Poet; playwright; engraver; lithographer
- Known for: French dramatist, poet.

Félix-Henri "Henry" Bataille (French pronunciation: [ɑ̃ʁi bataj]; 1872–1922) was a French poet, playwright. engraver and lithographer, popular during the early 20th century.

== Biography ==
Bataille's parents died when he was young. He attended the École des Beaux-Arts and Académie Julian to study painting, but started writing when he was 14. Henry wrote plays and poems, but after the success of his second play, La Lépreuse, he became a playwright exclusively. Bataille's early works explored the effects of passion on human motivation and how stifling the social conventions of the times could be. For example, Maman Colibri, is about a middle-aged woman's affair with a younger man. Later, Bataille would gravitate towards the theatre of ideas and social drama.

Bataille was also a theorist of subconscious motivation. While he did not use his theories in most of his own works, he influenced later playwrights such as Jean-Jacques Bernard and the "school of silence".

== Works ==
- La Belle au bois dormant, 1894
- La Chambre blanche (poetry), 1895
- La Lépreuse, 1896
- L'Enchantement, 1900
- Le Masque, 1902
- Maman Colibri (Mother Colibri), 1904
- La Marche nupitale, 1905
- Poliche, 1906
- La Femme nue, 1908
- Le Scandale, 1909
- La Vierge folle (The Foolish Virgin), 1910
- L'Enfant de l'amour, 1911
- Le Phalène, 1913
- L'Amazone, 1916
- La divine tragédie (poetry), 1917
- L'Animateur, 1920
- L'Homme à la rose, 1920
- La Tendresse, 1921
- La Possession, 1921
- La Chair humaine (Human Flesh), 1922

== Filmography ==
- The Naked Truth, directed by Carmine Gallone (Italy, 1914, based on the play La Femme nue)
- The Wedding March, directed by Carmine Gallone (Italy, 1915, based on the play La Marche nupitale)
- La falena, directed by Carmine Gallone (Italy, 1916, based on the play Le Phalène)
- L'Enfant de l'amour, directed by Emilio Ghione (Italy, 1916, based on the play L'Enfant de l'amour)
- Maman Colibri, directed by Alfredo De Antoni (Italy, 1918, based on the play Maman Colibri)
- Le Scandale, directed by Jacques de Baroncelli (France, 1918, based on the play Le Scandale)
- Incantesimo, directed by Ugo Gracci (Italy, 1919, based on the play L'Enchantement)
- La vergine folle, directed by Gennaro Righelli (Italy, 1920, based on the play La Vierge folle)
- La maschera, directed by Ivo Illuminati (Italy, 1921, based on the play Le Masque)
- The Nude Woman, directed by Roberto Roberti (Italy, 1922, based on the play La Femme nue)
- The Scandal, directed by Arthur Rooke (UK, 1923, based on the play Le Scandale)
- The Nude Woman, directed by Léonce Perret (France, 1926, based on the play La Femme nue)
- La Vierge folle, directed by Luitz-Morat (France, 1929, based on the play La Vierge folle)
- The Wedding March, directed by André Hugon (France, 1929, based on the play La Marche nupitale)
- La Possession, directed by Léonce Perret (France, 1929, based on the play La Possession)
- Der Narr seiner Liebe, directed by Olga Chekhova (Germany, 1929, based on the play Poliche)
- Maman Colibri, directed by Julien Duvivier (France, 1929, based on the play Maman Colibri)
- L'Enfant de l'amour, directed by Marcel L'Herbier (France, 1930, based on the play L'Enfant de l'amour)
- La Tendresse, directed by André Hugon (France, 1930, based on the play La Tendresse)
  - Zärtlichkeit, directed by Richard Löwenbein (Germany, 1930, based on the play La Tendresse)
- The Nude Woman, directed by Jean-Paul Paulin (France, 1932, based on the play La Femme nue)
- Le Scandale, directed by Marcel L'Herbier (France, 1934, based on the play Le Scandale)
- Poliche, directed by Abel Gance (France, 1934, based on the play Poliche)
- The Private Life of Don Juan, directed by Alexander Korda (UK, 1934, based on the play L'Homme à la rose)
- La Marche nupitale, directed by Mario Bonnard (France, 1935, based on the play La Marche nupitale)
  - The Wedding March, directed by Mario Bonnard (Italy, 1935, based on the play La Marche nupitale)
- Maman Colibri, directed by Jean Dréville (France, 1937, based on the play Maman Colibri)
- Second Youth, directed by Michał Waszyński (Poland, 1938, based on the play Maman Colibri)
- La Vierge folle, directed by Henri Diamant-Berger (France, 1938, based on the play La Vierge folle)
- Imprudencia, directed by Julián Soler (Mexico, 1944, based on the play Le Scandale)
- L'Enfant de l'amour, directed by Jean Stelli (France, 1944, based on the play L'Enfant de l'amour)
- La Femme nue, directed by André Berthomieu (France, 1949, based on the play La Femme nue)

== Bibliography ==
- "Bataille, (Félix) Henri". Retrieved 17 April 2009 from Funk & Wagnalls New World Encyclopedia database, EBSCOhost
- "Bataille, Félix Henry". Encyclopedia Americana. Grolier Online
- Buss, Robin. "Baitaille, Henry". Grolier Multimedia Encyclopedia. 2009. Grolier Online
- "Henry Bataille". In Encyclopædia Britannica. Retrieved 17 April 2009, from Encyclopædia Britannica Online
