= The Nude Woman (1926 film) =

1926 film

- German release poster
- Directed by: Léonce Perret
- Written by: Henry Bataille (play)
- Produced by: Bernard Natan
- Starring: Iván Petrovich; Louise Lagrange; Nita Naldi
- Cinematography: Raymond Agnel; René Colas; René Gaveau
- Production company: Pathé-Natan
- Distributed by: Pathé-Natan
- Release date: 10 December 1926
- Country: France
- Languages: Silent; French intertitles

The Nude Woman (French: La femme nue) is a 1926 French silent drama film directed by Léonce Perret and starring Iván Petrovich, Louise Lagrange and Nita Naldi. Based on a play by Henry Bataille, it was remade as a sound film in 1932. The film's sets were designed by the art director Lucien Jaquelux. It was shot in Nice.

Perret was criticised for having modified the desperate denouement of the original play.

Hebdo indicated that the film marked a new era in the career of the filmmaker.

== Cast ==
- Iván Petrovich as Pierre Bernier
- Louise Lagrange as Lolette
- Nita Naldi as Princesse de Chabrant
- André Nox as Prince de Chabran
- Blanche Beaume as Madame de Garcin
- Mary Harris as Sonia
- Maurice de Canonge as Rouchard
- Henri Rudaux as Maitre Rivet, notary
- Richard as Arnheim
- Alexis Nogornoff as Gréville
- Bidau]
- Clairette de Savoye
- René Ginet
- Hope Johnson
- André Liabel

== Reception ==
A French contemporary publication found that it was "A beautiful film in which Léonce Perret was able to convey the morbid sensitivity of Henry Bataille's work."

The film was also noted for its depiction of "fashionable resorts and chic Paris restaurants".

== See also ==
- The Naked Truth (1914)
- The Nude Woman (1922)
- The Nude Woman (1932)

== Bibliography ==
- Dayna Oscherwitz & MaryEllen Higgins. The A to Z of French Cinema. Scarecrow Press, 2009.
