= Jack Salvatori =

- Born: Giovanni Salvatori; 1900; Rome, Lazio, Italy
- Died: 1950 (aged 48–49); Paddington, London, United Kingdom
- Occupation: Director
- Years active: 1930–1946

Jack Salvatori, born as Giovanni Salvatori (1900–1950) was an English/ Italian film director.

== Selected filmography ==
- De Sensatie van de Toekomst (1931)
- The Doctor's Secret (1931)

== Bibliography ==
- Waldman, Harry. Missing Reels: Lost Films of American and European Cinema. McFarland, 2000.
