= Adventure in Diamonds =

1940 film by George Fitzmaurice

- Directed by: George Fitzmaurice
- Written by: Frank O'Connor; Leonard Lee; Franz Schulz
- Produced by: A.M. Botsford; William LeBaron
- Starring: George Brent; Isa Miranda; John Loder; Nigel Bruce
- Cinematography: Charles Lang
- Edited by: LeRoy Stone
- Music by: Charles Bradshaw; Sigmund Krumgold
- Production company: Paramount Pictures
- Distributed by: Paramount Pictures
- Release date: March 8, 1940
- Running time: 76 minutes
- Country: United States
- Language: English

Adventure in Diamonds is a 1940 American crime film directed by George Fitzmaurice and starring George Brent, Isa Miranda, John Loder and Nigel Bruce. It was also released under the alternative title of Diamonds are Dangerous.

Critics noted similarities in the plot with Desire (1936), produced by the same studio, which had starred Marlene Dietrich. Adventure in Diamonds was part of an attempt to position Miranda as a European star in the style of Dietrich and Greta Garbo. It was the second of two Hollywood films in which Miranda appeared before returning to her native Italy.

== Plot ==
Captain Stephen Dennett of the Royal Air Force is aboard a passenger airliner flying to South Africa, when he meets the beautiful and glamorous Felice Falcon. He is unaware that Felice is an accomplished jewel thief traveling with her partner in crime Michael Barclay. They are planning a heist in the South African mines in which they will steal a shipment of diamonds and escape unnoticed. The diamonds are already cached by one of Felice's accomplices, but she needs a way to enter the restricted mine area without raising suspicion. Felice schemes to use Stephen for the plot, using her charm to persuade him to permit her entry to the forbidden area because of his status as a military officer.

However, Stephen is not fooled and takes possession of the stolen jewels himself. He tries to frame the two thieves and contacts his acquaintance, the police commissioner Colonel J.W. Lansfield. Stephen surrenders the jewels to Lansfield, who has pursuing Barclay for a long time, and he sets a trap with the jewels. However, the plan backfires, and Felice is caught in the trap instead of Barclay. She is sentenced to prison but is offered a parole by Lansfield if she agrees to help catch a new ring of jewel thieves operating in the area. She is to pretend to be Stephen's new wife, and they are supposed to deliver the stolen jewels to the new gang.

While they wait to be contacted by the gang, Felice and Stephen spend some quality time together, and Felice falls truly in love with Stephen. She renounces her criminal past in order to start anew. The gang eventually makes contact and their leader is revealed to be Felice's old accomplice Barclay, causing Felice and Stephen's cover to be exposed. However, they are rescued by the Lansfield and his men.

== Cast ==
- George Brent as Captain Dennett
- Isa Miranda as Felice Falcon
- John Loder as Michael Barclay
- Nigel Bruce as Colonel Lansfield
- Elizabeth Patterson as Nellie
- Matthew Boulton as Lloyd
- Rex Evans as Jimmy
- Cecil Kellaway as Emerson
- Walter Kingsford as Wakefield
- Ernest Truex as Toutasche
- Ralph Forbes as Mr. Perrins
- Genia Nikolaieva as Mrs. Perrins
- Charles Irwin as Nelson
- E.E. Clive as Mr. MacPherson
- Vera Lewis as Mrs. MacPherson
- Edward Gargan as Lou
- Rex Downing as Buttons
- Roger Gray as Sergeant at Airport
- Virginia Lee Corbin as Nightclub Woman

== Reception ==
In a contemporary review for The New York Times, critic B. R. Crisler called the film "a crackling good second-rate melodrama" and wrote: "The world may never see a gem-lifter who is as glamorous as Isa Miranda and still has to go to the South African mines for diamonds, or a hero who is completely honest and yet as fascinatingly urbane as George Brent ... But making an honest livelihood is dull enough; we insist that diamond-stealing, at least, shall be amusing and brilliantly peopled."

== Bibliography ==
- Gundle, Stephen. Mussolini's Dream Factory: Film Stardom in Fascist Italy. Berghahn Books, 2013.
