= Lamberto Picasso =

Italian actor

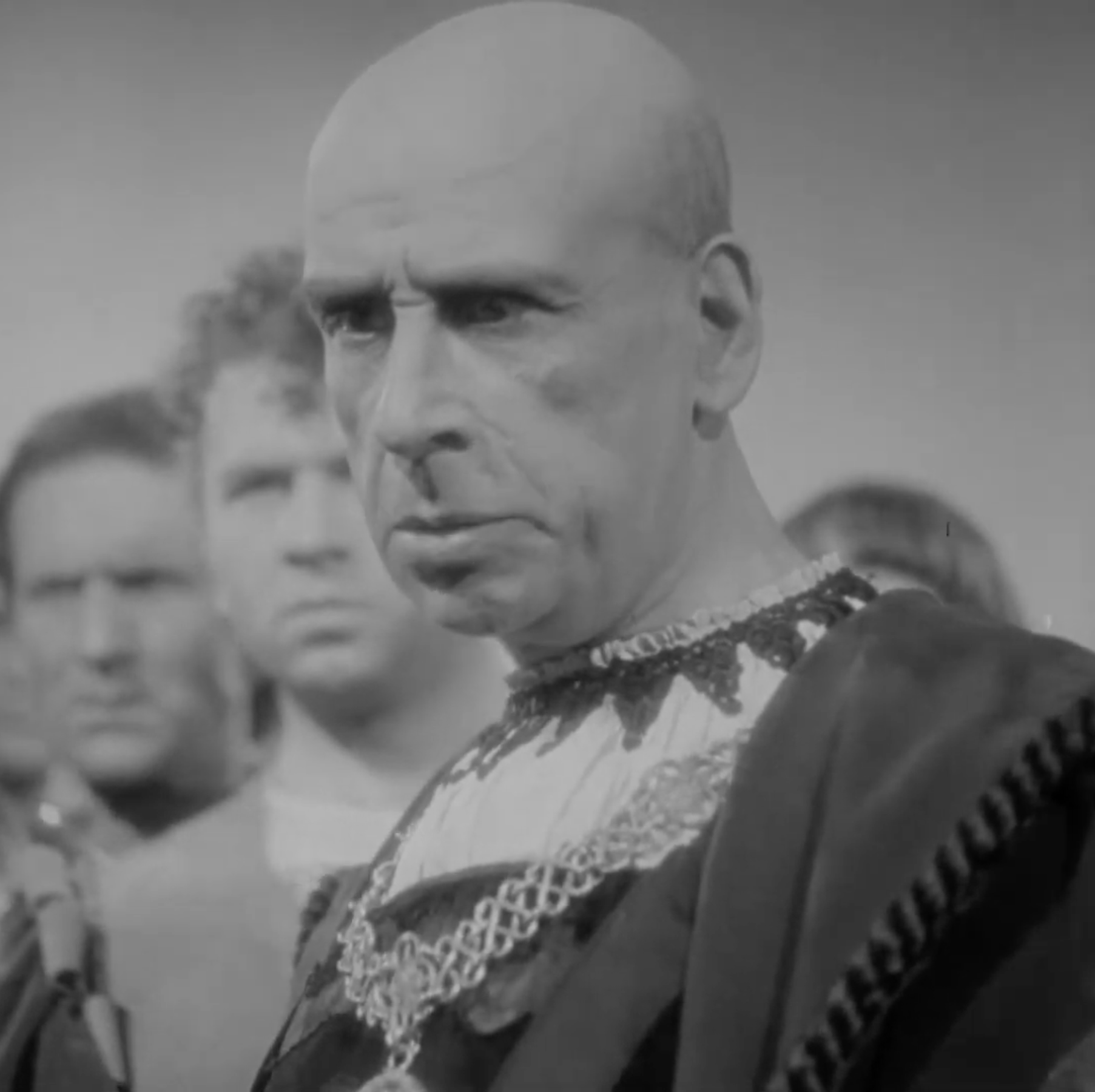
- Picasso in Ettore Fieramosca (1938)
- Born: 21 October 1880; La Spezia, Liguria, Italy
- Died: 17 September 1962 (aged 81); Rome, Italy
- Occupation: Actor
- Years active: 1914–1953

Lamberto Picasso (21 October 1880 – 17 September 1962) was an Italian film actor. He appeared in 70 films between 1914 and 1953.

== Life and career ==
Born in La Spezia, Picasso studied at the Istituto Tecnico in Genoa, and made his acting debut on stage alongside Ermete Novelli. After working among others with the companies led by Teresa Franchini, Irma Gramatica and Antonio Gandusio, he served in the World War I as a lieutenant. After the war, he started also working as a stage director, getting a personal success in 1930 with his rendition of R. C. Sherriff's Journey's End. In 1933, after working with Tatyana Pavlova he stepped away from the theater, resuming an intense stage activity in 1939 before his final retirement from acting in 1957; his last work was a successful rendition of Sophocles’Oedipus Rex directed by Vittorio Gassman. He was also active in films, being mainly cast in supporting roles, with a career which spanned from silent cinema until early 1950s. He was married to actress Ginevra Cavaciocchi.

== Selected filmography ==
- The Naked Truth (1914)
- The Doctor's Secret (1931)
- Paradise (1932)
- Your Money or Your Life (1932)
- Fanny (1933)
- Together in the Dark (1933)
- The Missing Treaty (1933)
- Everybody's Woman (1934)
- The Wedding March (1934)
- Those Two (1935)
- The Two Sergeants (1936)
- Scipio Africanus: The Defeat of Hannibal (1937)
- Doctor Antonio (1937)
- Giuseppe Verdi (1938)
- The Cuckoo Clock (1938)
- Ettore Fieramosca (1938)
- Wealth Without a Future (1939)
- Diamonds (1939)
- No Man's Land (1939)
- Beyond Love (1940)
- Caravaggio (1941)
- A Garibaldian in the Convent (1942)
- The Countess of Castiglione (1942)
- Rita of Cascia (1943)
- Calafuria (1943)
- Measure for Measure (1943)
- I'll Sing No More (1945)
- No Turning Back (1945)
- The Lovers (1946)
- Mad About Opera (1948)
- Heart (1948)
- The Monastery of Santa Chiara (1949)
- Pact with the Devil (1950)
- The Young Caruso (1951)
- Messalina (1951)
- Frine, Courtesan of Orient (1953)
