= The Side Show of Life =

1924 film by Herbert Brenon

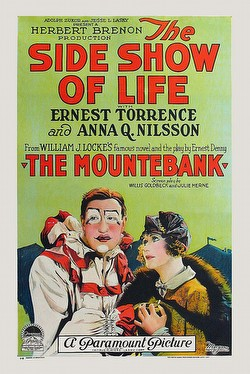
- 1924 film poster, likenesses of Ernest Torrence and Anna Q. Nilsson
- Directed by: Herbert Brenon
- Screenplay by: Scenarios: Willis Goldbeck; Julie Herne
- Based on: The Mountebank (novel) by William J. Locke The Mountebank (play) by Ernest Denny
- Produced by: Herbert Brenon; Jesse L. Lasky; Adolph Zukor
- Starring: Ernest Torrence; Neil Hamilton
- Cinematography: James Wong Howe
- Production company: Famous Players–Lasky
- Distributed by: Paramount Pictures
- Release dates: July 21, 1924 (New York City); September 1, 1924 (Nationwide)
- Running time: 80 minutes
- Country: United States
- Language: Silent (English intertitles)

The Side Show of Life is a 1924 American silent drama film produced by Famous Players–Lasky, directed by Herbert Brenon and distributed by Paramount Pictures. The film is based on the 1920 novel The Mountebank by William J. Locke, which had been turned into a play by Ernest Denny.

== Cast ==
- Ernest Torrence as Andrew Lackaday
- Anna Q. Nilsson as Lady Auriol Dayne
- Louise Lagrange as Elodie
- Maurice de Canonge as Horatio Bakkus (as Maurice Cannon)
- Neil Hamilton as Charles Verity-Stewart
- William Ricciardi as Mignon
- Mrs. Pozzi as Ernestine
- Lawrence D'Orsay as Sir Julius Verity-Stewart
- Effie Shannon as Lady Verity-Stewart
- Katherine Lee as Evadne

== Production ==
Ernest Torrence stars in the role of a clown during World War I which is similar to that of Lon Chaney's in He Who Gets Slapped, released that same year, and in Laugh, Clown, Laugh, released four years later. Norman Trevor starred in the Broadway play in 1923.

== Preservation ==
A seemingly unobtainable print of The Side Show of Life survives in the Gosfilmofond archive, Moscow, Russia.
