= A Woman Has Fallen =

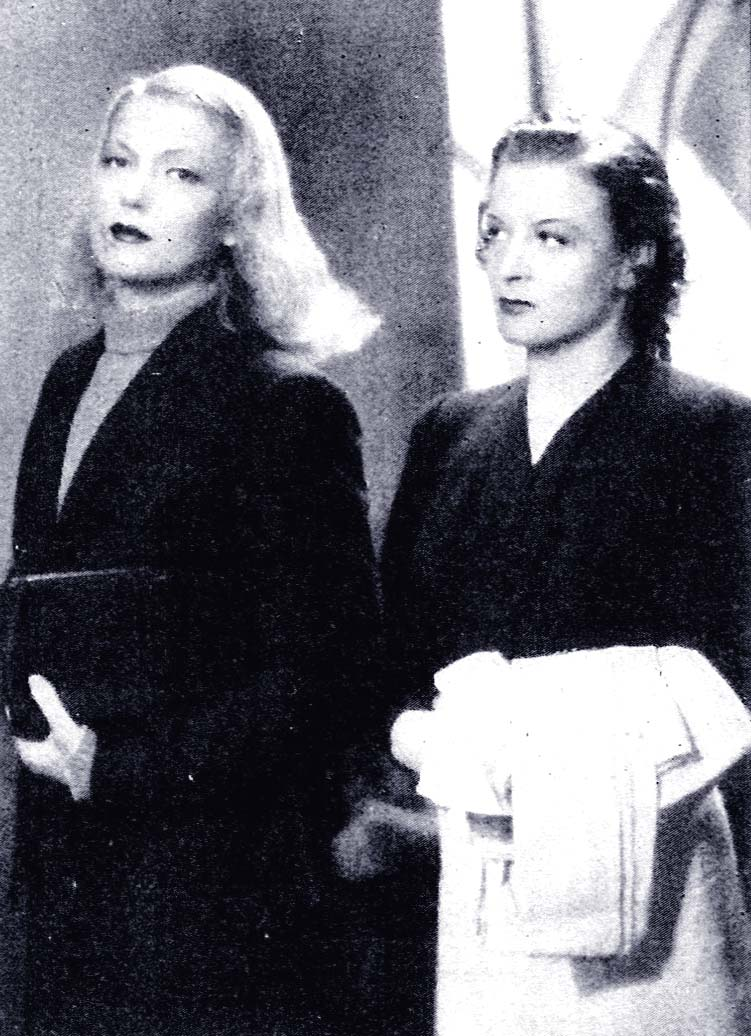
- Still with Isa Miranda and Anita Farra
- Directed by: Alfredo Guarini
- Written by: Milli Dandolo (novel); Ugo Betti; Sandro De Feo; Alfredo Guarini; Ercole Patti; Vincenzo Talarico; Piero Tellini; Cesare Zavattini
- Starring: Isa Miranda; Rossano Brazzi; Claudio Gora
- Cinematography: Ubaldo Arata
- Edited by: Dolores Tamburini; Gabriele Varriale
- Music by: Edgardo Carducci
- Production company: Scalera Film
- Distributed by: Scalera Film
- Release date: 17 December 1941
- Running time: 72 minutes
- Country: Italy
- Language: Italian

A Woman Has Fallen (Italian: È caduta una donna) is a 1941 Italian drama film directed by Alfredo Guarini and starring Isa Miranda, Rossano Brazzi, and Claudio Gora.

The film's sets were designed by the art directors Gustav Abel, Paolo Reni, and Amleto Bonetti.

== Cast ==
- Isa Miranda as Dina
- Rossano Brazzi as Dottor Roberto Frassi
- Vittorina Benvenuti as Teresa, la governante
- Anita Farra as sig.ra Cattaneo
- Jone Frigerio as l'anziana madre di Giovanni
- Olga Solbelli as la direttrice della casa di mode
- Claudio Gora as Mario
- Luigi Pavese as Fabbri
- Nando Tamberlani as un amico di Nora
- Luigi Zerbinati as Montarone
- Nietta Zocchi as una cliente della casa di mode
- Liana Del Balzo as una vicina di casa
- Diana Dei as l'infermiera del reparto maternità

== Bibliography ==
- Chiti, Roberto; Lancia, Enrico (1993). Dizionario del cinema italiano - i film. vol I (1930 - 1944) (in Italian). Rome: Gremese. ISBN 88-7605-596-7.
