= Sandra Ravel =

Italian film actress

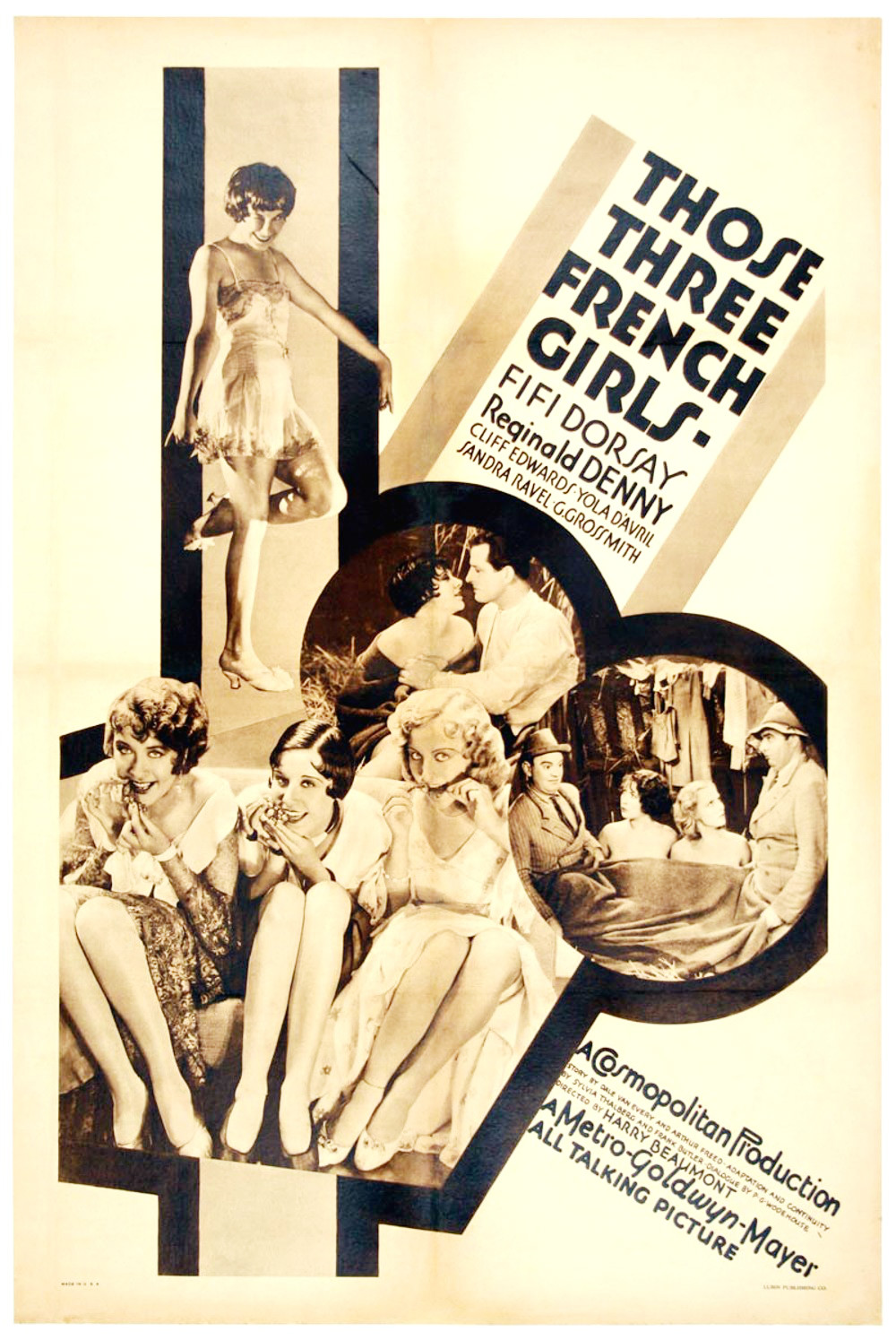
- Those Three French Girls movie poster, with Yola d'Avril, Fifi D'Orsay, and Sandra Ravel (from left to right)
- Born: Alessandra Winkelhauser Ratti; 16 January 1910; Milan, Lombardy, Italy
- Died: 13 August 1954 (aged 44); Milan, Lombardy, Italy
- Other name: Alessandra Leverkusen
- Occupation: Actress
- Years active: 1930–1939 (film)
- Spouse: Rodolfo Gucci (m. 1944)
- Children: Maurizio Gucci

Sandra Ravel (16 January 1910 – 13 August 1954) was an Italian film actress of the 1930s.

== Biography ==
She was born as Alessandra Winkelhauser Ratti in Milan, Italy in 1910 to a German father who was a chemical plant worker, and a Swiss mother from the Ratti family of Lugano.

Ravel had a minor role in Together in the Dark, where she met her future husband. She was married in 1944 in Venice to the actor and entrepreneur Rodolfo Gucci. Their only child, Maurizio (1948-1995), was named for his father's theatrical alter ego, "Maurizio D'Ancora".

Sandra Ravel died in 1954, aged 44, from uterine cancer in her native Lombardy.

== Filmography ==
- Mysterious Mr. Parkes (1930)
- Those Three French Girls (1930)
- War Nurse (1930)
- The Single Sin (1931)
- Paradise (1932)
- A Star Disappears (1932)
- Together in the Dark (1933)
- The House of Shame (1938)
- A Wife in Danger (1939)
- The Castle Ball (1939)
- Two Million for a Smile (1939)
