= Thérèse Albert =

French actress

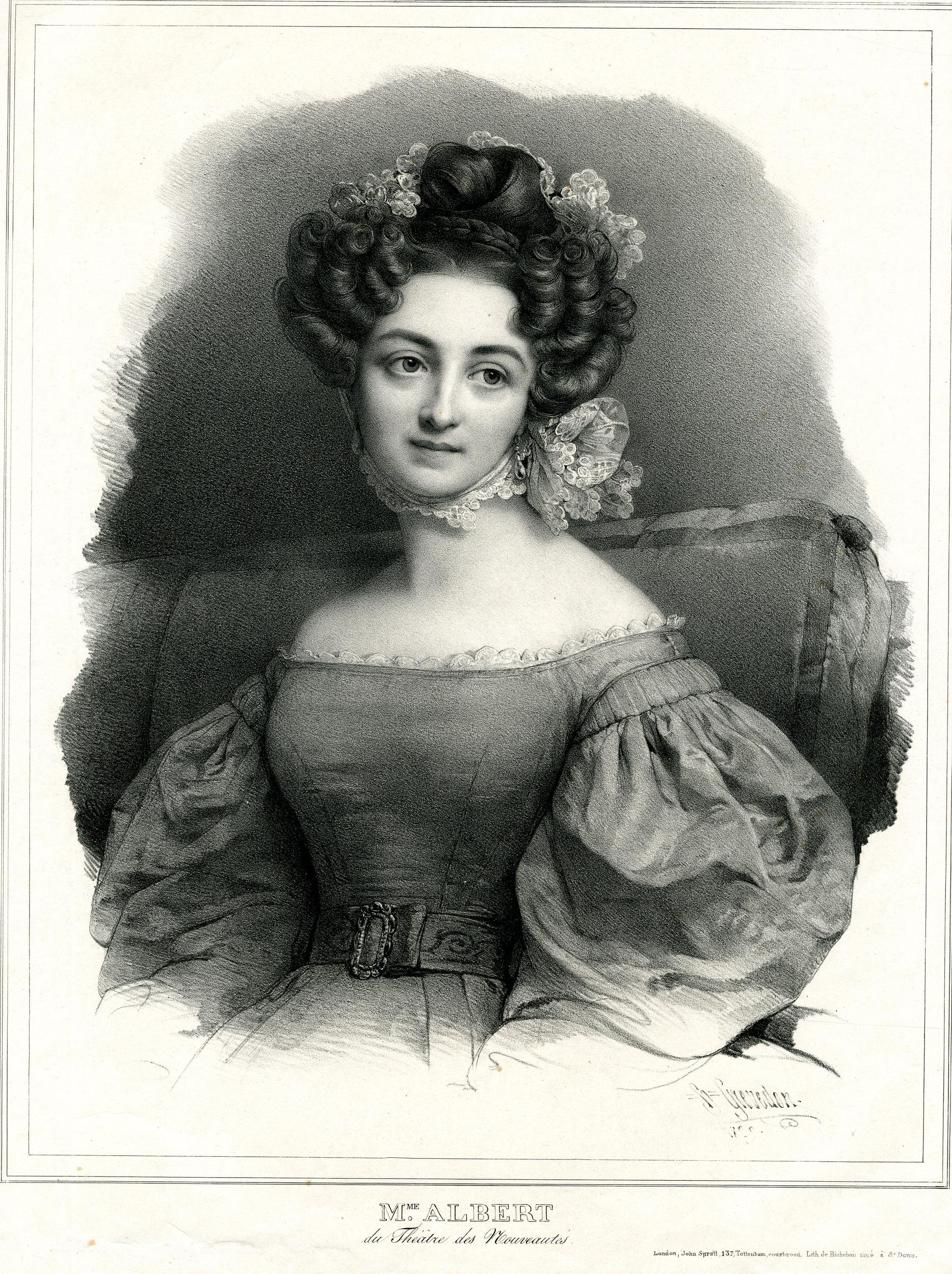
Thérèse Albert in 1829, when a member of the Théâtre des Nouveautés

Thérèse Vernet (c. 1805-1846) was a French actress, widely known as Madame Albert from her marriage to Albert Rodrigues, an actor who performed under his given name. Born to an acting family, she attained fame for her grace and beauty as well as for the range of her acting skills. Besides becoming the "idol of Paris" she was also well known in the provinces due to long theatrical tours she undertook outside the capital. Ill-health compelled her to retire in 1846. In 1846 she married for the second time, to the actor and playwright Eugene Bignon (1812–1858).

== Biography ==
Marie Charlotte Thérèse Vernet was born on 28 Vendémiaire, Year XIV (October 20, 1805) in Toulouse. She was the daughter of Jean-Nicolas Vernet, an actor, and Angélique Crescent.

Known for her roles as an actress, Marie Charlotte Thérèse Vernet began performing in vaudeville at the age of four, following in her father’s footsteps. She performed in Nîmes and Perpignan, and sang opera in Toulouse. She left that city for Bordeaux, where she lived for six years. There, on April 24, 1824, she married David Rodrigues, known as “Albert,” an actor. It was after this marriage that she became known as Madame Albert. She first joined the Odéon opera troupe in May 1825 and then, in 1827, joined the Théâtre des Nouveautés. In 1830, she joined the Théâtre du Vaudeville, where she performed in numerous comedies.

After a fire at the Théâtre du Vaudeville, she joined the Théâtre de la Renaissance. In 1845, her husband died. She returned to the Théâtre du Vaudeville, remarried Louis-Thomas Bignon, and performed with him at the Théâtre de la Gaîté (rue Papin). After a hiatus in her career due to breast cancer, she performed frequently in the provinces, prompting a critical review praising her talent: “It is regrettable that this charming actress, who possesses such soul and imagination, who so thoroughly embodies the spirit of her characters, and who understands the roles entrusted to her better than the authors themselves, has seen fit to leave Paris to spread throughout the provinces all the treasures of the delightful talents of an irresistible actress...”.

Her second husband also died in 1856, and she retired to Chartres, in the Faubourg Saint-Maurice, to the house of the Bon Secours Sisters, where she spent the rest of her life. She died there on March 24, 1860.
