= The Doctor's Secret (1931 film) =

1931 film

- Directed by: Jack Salvatori
- Written by: J.M. Barrie (play); Camillo Antona Traversi
- Starring: Soava Gallone; Lamberto Picasso; Alfredo Robert
- Cinematography: Fernando Risi
- Edited by: Merrill G. White
- Production company: Paramount Pictures
- Distributed by: Paramount Pictures
- Release date: September 1931
- Country: United States
- Language: Italian

The Doctor's Secret (Italian: Il segreto del dottore) is a 1931 American drama film directed by Jack Salvatori and starring Soava Gallone, Lamberto Picasso and Alfredo Robert. It was made at the Joinville Studios in Paris, as the Italian-language version of Paramount Pictures's The Doctor's Secret (1929). A separate Swedish-language version had also been produced at Joinville. The film's sets were designed by Paolo Reni.

== Cast ==
- Soava Gallone as Liliana Garner
- Lamberto Picasso as Giovanni
- Alfredo Robert as Il dottor Brady
- Oreste Bilancia as Redding
- Lina Modigliani as La signora Redding
- Vanna Vanni as Susanna, la cameriera
- Antonio Niccodemi as Riccardo, marito di Liliana

== Bibliography ==
- Waldman, Harry. Missing Reels: Lost Films of American and European Cinema. McFarland, 2000.
