= The Nude Woman (1922 film) =

1922 film

- Directed by: Roberto Roberti
- Written by: Henry Bataille (play)
- Starring: Francesca Bertini; Angelo Ferrari
- Production company: Caesar Film
- Distributed by: Caesar Film
- Release date: April 1922
- Country: Italy
- Languages: Silent; Italian intertitles

The Nude Woman (Italian: La donna nuda) is a 1922 Italian silent drama film directed by Roberto Roberti and starring Francesca Bertini and Angelo Ferrari.

The film's sets were designed by Alfredo Manzi.

== Cast ==
- Francesca Bertini
- Angelo Ferrari
- Franco Gennaro
- Iole Gerli
- Gino Viotti

== Release ==
A screening in Turin in 2024 was reportedly met with great enthousiasm of the audience. Although she thinks the film does not stand out in terms of quality, Letizia Cilea notes, in her biography of the actress, the role played with dignity by Bertini was praised by the audiences and critics alike.

== See also ==
- The Naked Truth (1914)
- The Nude Woman (1926)
- The Nude Woman (1932)

== Bibliography ==
- Cristina Jandelli. Le dive italiane del cinema muto. L'epos, 2006.
