= The Walls of Malapaga =

1949 films

- Original French film poster
- Directed by: René Clément
- Written by: Jean Aurenche; Pierre Bost (adaptation and dialogue); Cesare Zavattini; Suso Cecchi d'Amico; Alfredo Guarini (screenplay)
- Produced by: Alfredo Guarini
- Starring: Jean Gabin; Isa Miranda
- Cinematography: Louis Page
- Edited by: Mario Serandrei
- Music by: Roman Vlad
- Production companies: Italia Produzione; Francinex
- Distributed by: MGM (1949 Italian release); Films International (1950 US release)
- Release date: 16 November 1949 (France)
- Running time: France: 95 mins Italy: 104 minutes United States: 89 minutes
- Countries: France; Italy
- Languages: French; Italian
- Box office: 2,018,745 admissions (France)

The Walls of Malapaga (Italian: Le mura di Malapaga, French: Au-delà des grilles, lit. 'Beyond the Gates'), is a 1949 French-Italian drama film directed by René Clément and starring Jean Gabin, Isa Miranda and Andrea Checchi. It was a co-production made by Francinex and Italia Produzione, produced by Alfredo Guarini from a screenplay by Cesare Zavattini, Suso Cecchi d'Amico and Alfredo Guarini adapted by Jean Aurenche and Pierre Bost. The music score was by Roman Vlad and the cinematography by Louis Page. It was made at the Farnesina Studios of Titanus in Rome with sets designed by the art director Piero Filippone and Luigi Gervasi.

== Plot ==
French criminal on the run Pierre Arrignon finds himself in Genoa, where he falls in love with local woman Marta Manfredini (Isa Miranda). The film is set in Italy, and the dialogue is primarily in French.

== Cast ==
- Jean Gabin as Pierre Arrignon
- Isa Miranda as Marta Manfredini
- Vera Talchi as Cecchina, Marta's daughter
- Andrea Checchi as Giuseppe, Marta's husband
- Robert Dalban as the mariner
- Ave Ninchi as Maria, the neighbour
- Checco Rissone as the forger
- Renato Malavasi as the dentist
- Carlo Tamberlani as the inspector
- Vittorio Duse as the agent

== Awards ==
The Walls of Malapaga was highly regarded in its day: It won an honorary Academy Award for Best Foreign Language Film and both Clément and Miranda won awards at the 1949 Cannes Film Festival.
