= Document Z-3 =

1942 film

- Directed by: Alfredo Guarini
- Written by: Sandro De Feo; Ercole Patti; Corrado Sofia; Piero Tellini; Alfredo Guarini
- Starring: Isa Miranda; Claudio Gora; Luis Hurtado; Guglielmo Barnabò
- Cinematography: Gábor Pogány
- Edited by: Dolores Tamburini
- Music by: Eugenio Steccanella
- Production company: Artisti Associati
- Distributed by: Artisti Associati
- Release date: 12 April 1942
- Running time: 85 minutes
- Country: Italy
- Language: Italian

Document Z-3 (Italian: Documento Z-3) is a 1942 Italian spy film directed by Alfredo Guarini and starring Isa Miranda, Claudio Gora and Luis Hurtado. It was shot at the Fert Studios in Turin and on location at an airfield which later became Turin Airport. The films sets were designed by the art director Boris Bilinsky. It was one of three Miranda films directed by Guarini that helped re-establish her in Italian cinema following her return from a largely unsuccessful spell in Hollywood. Many critics were not impressed with the film, feeling that Miranda had not recovered the spontaneity of her pre-Hollywood films. This is considered the first production on which Federico Fellini worked, uncredited, as a screenwriter.

== Synopsis ==
In Yugoslavia, Sandra Morini, a young woman of Italian Dalmatian background is drawn into the world of espionage by Paolo a spy in Yugoslav intelligence but in reality a double agent working for Italy. She is to steal a secret document from the Russian commissar Petrov that reveals that Yugoslavia's public pro-Axis stance conceals a secret alliance with Stalin's Soviet Union. She then escapes from Zagreb heading for the safety of Venice.

== Cast ==
- Isa Miranda as Sandra Morini
- Claudio Gora as Paolo Sullich
- Luis Hurtado as Soviet Commissioner Petrov
- Guglielmo Barnabò as Kavelich
- Tina Lattanzi as La Semenov
- Amedeo Trilli as a Slavic official
- Carlo Tamberlani
- Aroldo Tieri
- Nicola Timofeiev

== Bibliography ==
- Gundle, Stephen. Mussolini's Dream Factory: Film Stardom in Fascist Italy. Berghahn Books, 2013.
