= Il sire di Vincigliata =

- Directed by: Alfredo Robert
- Written by: Unknown
- Produced by: Roberts Film/Série d'Art Pathé frères (SAPF)
- Starring: Alfredo Robert
- Release date: 1913
- Running time: 16 minutes
- Country: Italy
- Language: Silent (Italian intertitles)
- Budget: Unknown
- Box office: Unknown

Il sire di Vincigliata (‘The Sire of Vincigliata’) is a 1913 Italian silent colour film, produced by Roberts Film of Florence/Série d'Art Pathé frères (SAPF) and directed by Alfredo Robert who also plays the title character. The film runs for 16 minutes.

== Plot ==
To bring to an end a protracted war between the Sires of San Miniato and Vincigliata a marriage is arranged between their children Jacopo and Beatrice. One night however the bejewelled and beautiful Beatrice is distracted from the tender words of her betrothed by the serenade of a young troubadour beneath her window. When the Sire of Vincigliata discovers that his daughter has fallen in love with the troubadour, he has him put into prison and condemned to death by hanging. Beatrice bribes the prison guard to allow her beloved to escape. She waits for him in a boat and, although the alarm is sounded, they break free from their pursuers and head for the open sea. Her father is overwhelmed when he hears of the elopement and dies of a stroke.
