= Nicolas Anselme Baptiste =

French actor (1761–1835)

Baptiste Aîné
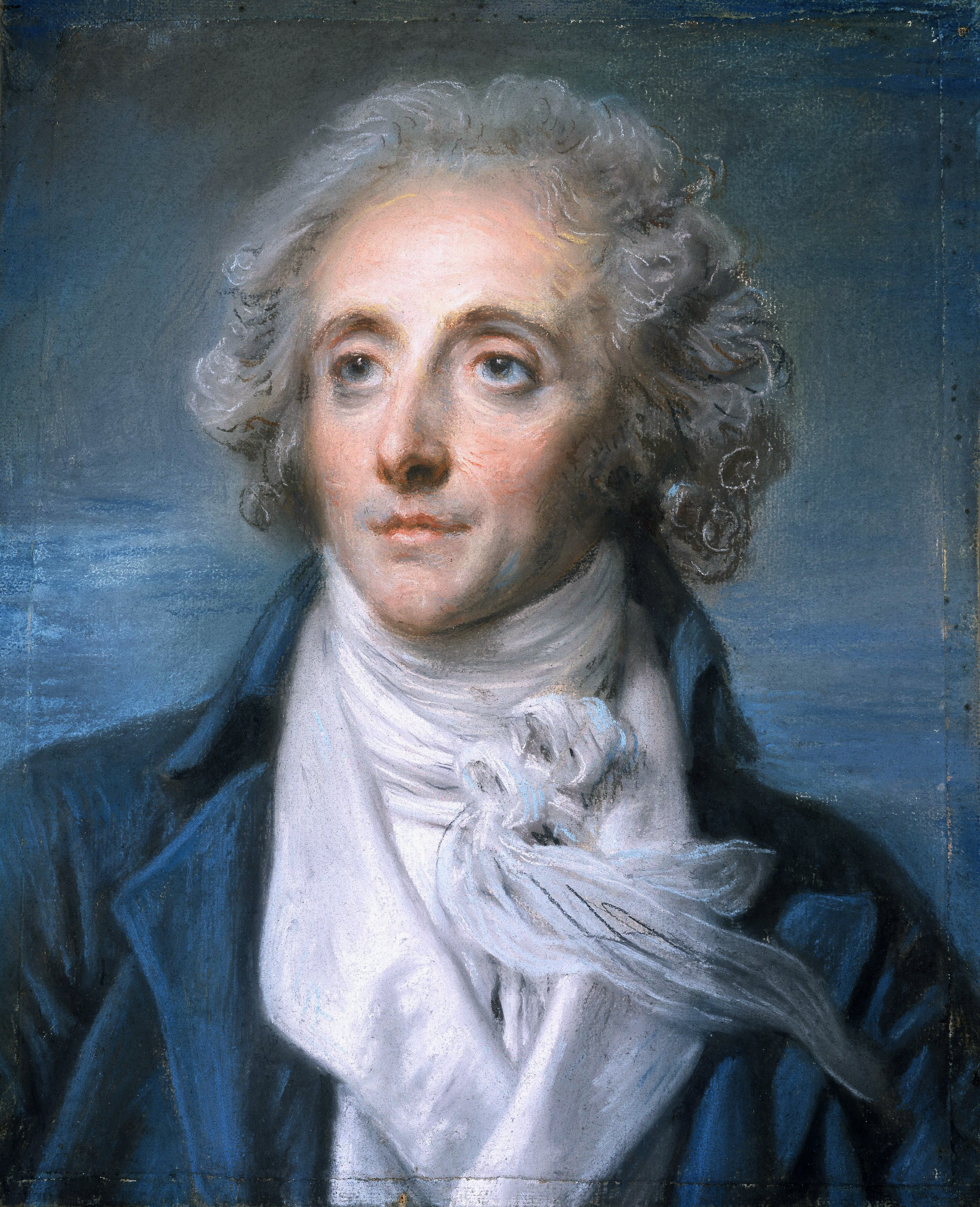
- Born: Nicolas Anselme Baptiste; June 18, 1761; Bordeaux, France
- Died: December 1, 1835 (aged 74); Paris, France
- Occupation: Actor

Nicolas Anselme Baptiste, more commonly known as Baptiste aîné (June 18, 1761 – December 1, 1835), was a French actor.

== Biography ==
He was born in Bordeaux, the elder son of Joseph François Anselme, a popular actor. His mother played leading parts in tragedy, and both his parents enjoyed the protection of Voltaire and the friendship of Lekain. It was under the auspices of the latter that Nicolas Anselme made his first appearance as de Belloy in Gaston et Bayard; and shortly afterwards, under the name of Baptiste, he made a contract to play young lover parts at Arras, where he also appeared in opera and even in pantomime. From Rouen, where he had three successful years, his reputation spread to Paris and he was summoned to the new theatre which the comedian Langlois Courcelles had just founded, and where he succeeded, not only in making an engagement for himself, but in bringing all his family, father, mother, wife and brother. They were thus distinguished in the playbills: Baptiste, ainé, Baptiste père, Baptiste cadet, Madame Baptiste mère, Madame Baptiste bru. This resulted in the pun of calling a play in which they all appeared une pièce de baptistes.

Nicolas soon obtained the public favour, specially in La Martellière's Robert, chef de brigands, and as Count Almaviva in Bèaumarchais’ La Mere coupable. His success in this was so great that the directors of the Théâtre de la République—who had already secured Talma, Dugazon and Madame Vestris—hastened to obtain his services, and, in order to get him at once (1793), paid the 20,000 francs forfeit which he was obliged to surrender on breaking his contract. Nicolas took all the leading parts in comedy and tragedy. As he grew older his special forte lay in noble fathers. After a brilliant career of thirty-five years of uninterrupted service, he retired in 1828. But, after the revolution of 1830, when the Théâtre Français was in dire straits, the brothers Baptiste came to the rescue, reappeared on the stage and helped to bring back its prosperity. Nicolas died in Paris.
