= Mysterious Mr. Parkes =

1930 film

- Directed by: Louis J. Gasnier
- Written by: Jacques Bataille-Henri; Percy Heath (play)
- Starring: Adolphe Menjou; Claudette Colbert
- Cinematography: Allen G. Siegler
- Edited by: Jacques Bataille-Henri
- Production company: Paramount Pictures
- Distributed by: Paramount Pictures
- Release dates: August 30, 1930 (U.S.); October 17, 1930 (France)
- Running time: 75 minutes
- Country: United States
- Language: French

Mysterious Mr. Parkes (French title: L'Énigmatique Monsieur Parkes) is a 1930 American Pre-Code comedy drama film made by Paramount Pictures, directed by Louis J. Gasnier. It was a French-language version of Slightly Scarlet for the European market.

== Plot ==
It tells the story of heroine Lucy, who is forced to serve as accomplice for an international jewel thief Malatroff in Nice, whereupon Englishman Mr. Parkes rescues her from Malatroff.

== Cast ==
- Adolphe Menjou as Courtenay Parkes
- Claudette Colbert as Lucy Stavrin
- Emile Chautard as Sylvester Corbett
- Adrienne D'Ambricourt as Mrs. Corbett
- Sandra Ravel as Edith Corbett
- Armand Kaliz as Malatroff
- André Cheron as Police Captain
