= The Wedding March (1929 film) =

1929 film

- Directed by: André Hugon
- Written by: Henry Bataille (play); André Hugon
- Starring: Pierre Blanchar; Louise Lagrange; Paul Guidé
- Cinematography: Raymond Agnel
- Production company: Films André Hugon
- Distributed by: Les Films Paramount
- Release date: 15 March 1929
- Country: France
- Languages: Silent; French intertitles

The Wedding March (French: La marche nuptiale) is a 1929 French silent comedy film directed by André Hugon and starring Pierre Blanchar, Louise Lagrange and Paul Guidé.

It was made by the French subsidiary of Paramount Pictures. The film's sets were designed by the art director Christian-Jaque.

== Cast ==
- Pierre Blanchar
- Louise Lagrange
- Paul Guidé
- Olga Day
- Janine Borelli
- Louise Dauville
- Emilio Vardannes

== See also ==
- The Wedding March (1915)
- The Wedding March (1934)
