= Alfredo Guarini =

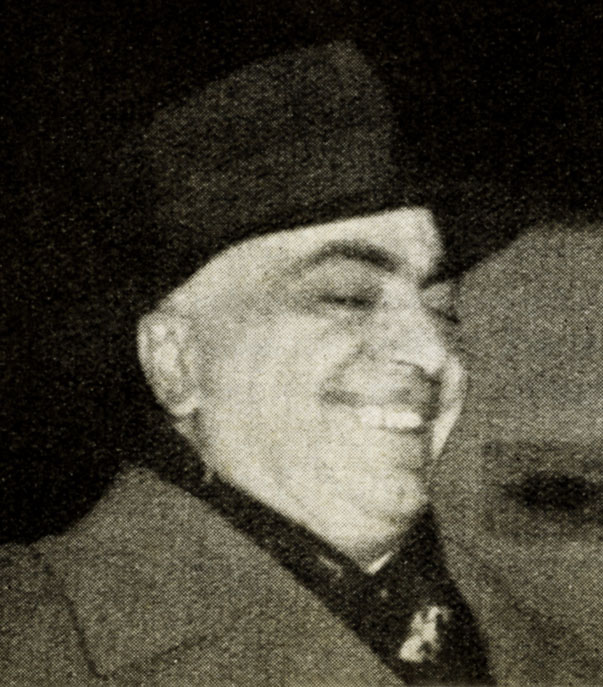
- Born: 23 May 1901; Genoa, Liguria; Italy
- Died: 6 April 1981 (aged 79); Rome, Lazio; Italy
- Occupations: Screenwriter; Producer; Director
- Years active: 1935–1963

Alfredo Guarini (23 May 1901–6 April 1981) was an Italian screenwriter, film producer and director. Guarini is noted in particular for his management of the career of the Italian actress Isa Miranda, who he eventually married. In the mid-1930s he was responsible for persuading her to work in a variety of different countries to build up a greater international profile after her breakthrough success in Everybody's Woman (1934).

== Selected filmography ==
=== Director ===
- A Woman Has Fallen (1941)
- Document Z-3 (1942)
- Charley's Aunt (1943)

=== Producer ===
- Lady of Paradise (1934)
- Red Passport (1935)
- Germany Year Zero (1948)
- The Walls of Malapaga (1949)
- Journey to Italy (1954)
- Esterina (1959)
- Thor and the Amazon Women (1963)

== Bibliography ==
- Gundle, Stephen. Mussolini's Dream Factory: Film Stardom in Fascist Italy. Berghahn Books, 2013.
