= Slightly Scarlet (1930 film) =

1930 film

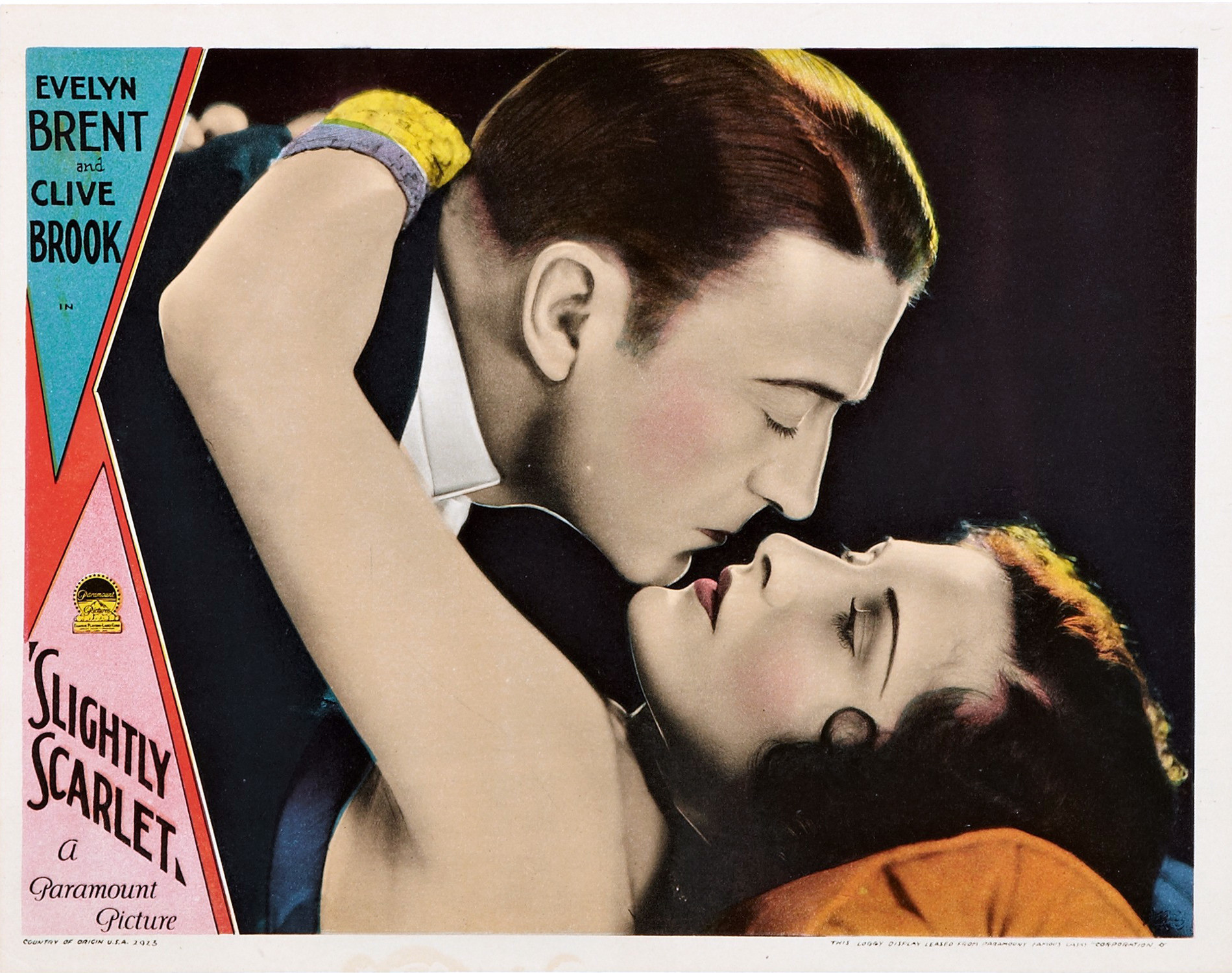
- Lobby card
- Directed by: Louis J. Gasnier; Edwin H. Knopf
- Written by: Howard Estabrook; Joseph L. Mankiewicz; Percy Heath (play)
- Starring: Evelyn Brent
- Cinematography: Allen G. Siegler
- Edited by: Eda Warren
- Distributed by: Paramount Pictures
- Release date: February 22, 1930
- Running time: 70 minutes
- Country: United States
- Language: English

Slightly Scarlet is a 1930 American pre-Code comedy drama film directed by Louis J. Gasnier and Edwin H. Knopf and starring Evelyn Brent and Clive Brook. The film was shot in several different language versions, with different casts. The French version was titled L'énigmatique Mr. Parkes, and stars Claudette Colbert as Lucy and Adolphe Menjou as Parkes.

== Cast ==
- Evelyn Brent as Lucy Stavrin
- Clive Brook as Hon. Courtenay Parkes
- Paul Lukas as Malatroff
- Eugene Pallette as Sylvester Corbett
- Helen Ware as Corbett's Wife
- Virginia Bruce as Enid Corbett
- Henry Wadsworth as Sandy Weyman
- Claud Allister as Albert Hawkins
- Morgan Farley as Malatroff's Victim
- André Cheron as Butler (uncredited)
- Georges Renavent as Inspector (uncredited)
- Rolfe Sedan as Gendarme (uncredited)
- Charles Sullivan as Chauffeur (uncredited)
