= Marie-Louise Cébron-Norbens =

French opera singer

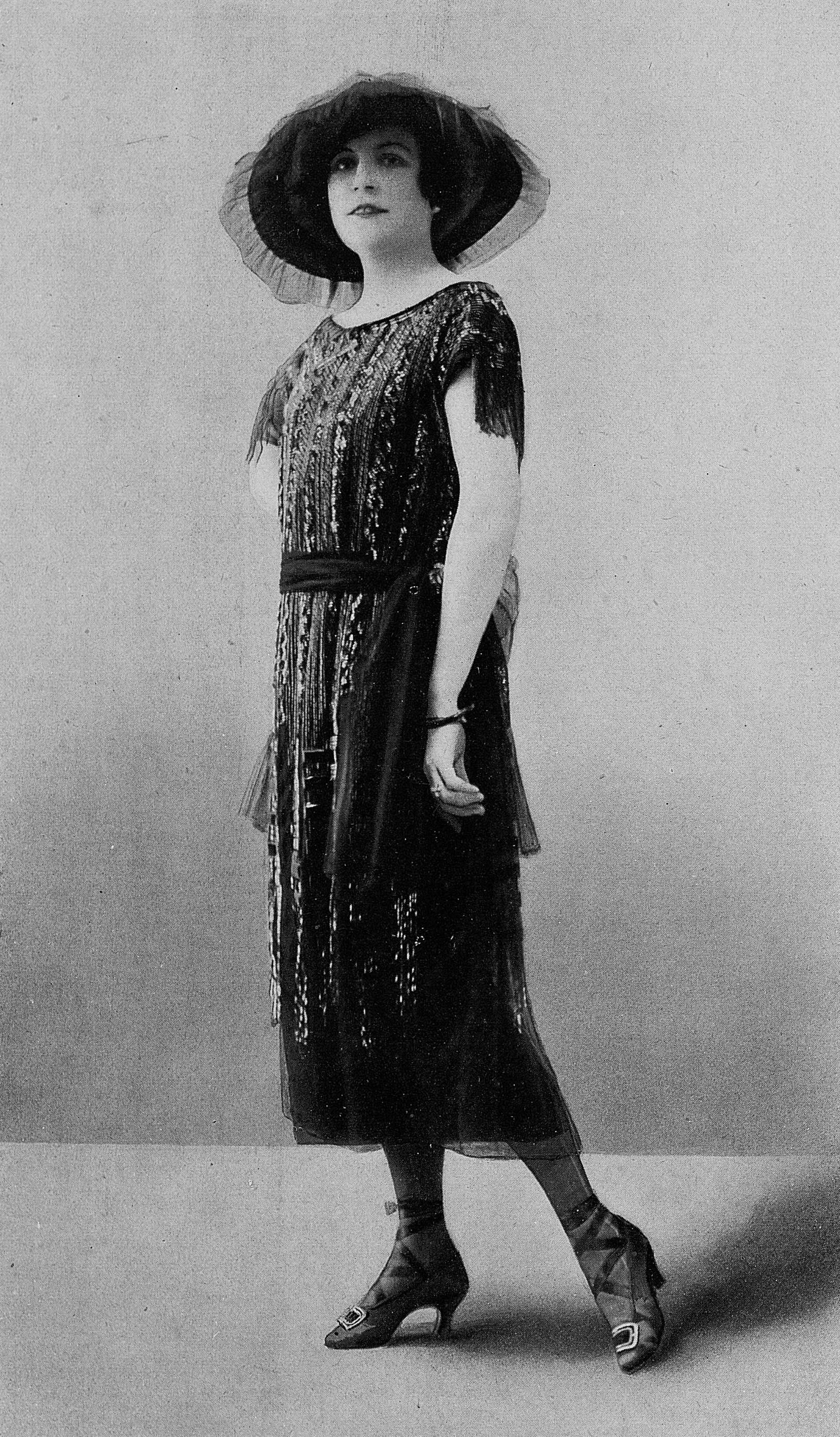
Marie-Louis Cébron-Norbens (1919)

Marie-Louise Cébron-Norbens (1888–1958) was a French mezzo-soprano opera singer who is remembered for her roles in operetta. She made her début at the Gaîté-Lyrique as Prince Charming in Nicolas Isouard's Cendrillon in January 1909. She went on to perform in operettas in various Paris theatres until 1938, participating in the première of Ruggero Leoncavallo's Malbrouck s'en va-t-en guerre at the Théâtre Apollo in November 1910. One of her major successes was the role of Zélie in Louis Urgel's operetta Monsieur Dumollet at the Théâtre du Vaudeville in May 1922.

== Biography ==
Born in the 8th arrondissement of Paris on 31 March 1888, Marie Louise Berthe Cébron was the daughter of Berthe Marie Louise Cébron. She married twice, first on 25 July 1910 with the lawyer Jacques Josef Guélot who died fighting on 6 September 1914, and then on 11 September 1920 with Adolphe Eugère Altuzaara-Alvarrez of the Cuban consulate. From 1907 to 1908, she studied at the Paris Conservatoire where she received prizes, medals and certificates of merit in theory, voice, comic opera and opera.

Cébron Norbens made her début at the Gaîté-Lyrique in January 1909 as Prince Charming in Isouard's Cendrillon. The following December, at the Opéra-Comique she created the role of Bacchia in Ernest Garnier's Myrtil. While at the Opèra-Comique, she also played Charlotte in Werther and Santuzza in Cavalleria rusticana.

Appearing in various Paris theatres, in November 1910 she performed in the première of Leoncavallo's highly successful Malbrouck s’en va-t-en guerre at the Théâtre Apollo. Also at the Apollo, she took part in the premières of Claude Terrasse's les Transatlantiques in May 1911 and his Cartouche in May 1914 where she played Athénaïs. She is remembered in particular for creating Zélie in Urgel's Monsieur Dumollet which premièred at the Théâtre du Vaudeville in May 1922. As late as 1938 she appeared in Louis Varney's Les Mousquetaires au couvent as Soeur Opportune.

Marie-Louise Cébron-Norbens died in Château-Landon on 4 September 1958.
