= Madeleine Roch =

French actress

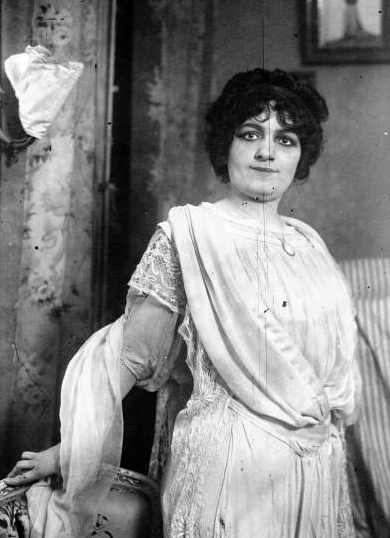
Madeleine Roch 1909

Madeleine Roch (August 10, 1883 in Mureaux, Seine-et-Oise – December 9, 1930 in Gaillon-sur-Montcient) was a French actress.

== Life and career ==
She was a student at the Conservatoire national de musique et de déclamation in Paris and received a first prize for tragedy in 1902 in the role of Roxane in Racine's Bajazet.

In 1903, at the age of twenty, she joined the Comédie-Française and became a member in 1912. The Comédie-Française exhibited a sculpted portrait of her.

After her death, a street (the Rue Madeleine Roch) in her home town was named after her; she is buried in the municipal cemetery there. A memorial plaque can be found on the Promenade des Marronniers, the former natural theater in Lectoure, where she performed for the last time on August 3, 1930.

René Berton wrote La Voix du mur, poème dialogue à la mémoire de Madeleine Roch (The Voice of the Wall, 1931) in memory of Madeleine Roch. She was featured in a 1976 comic book.

== Famous roles ==
Her career at the Comédie Française began with the role of Hermione in Andromache (1903). She also played the title role in Phèdre, Dona Sol in Hernani, the title role in Iphégenie, among many others. She had an early film role playing the title role in the 1908 film Antony and Cleopatra. She was later considered to be one of the most talented actresses at the Comédie.

When she died at the age of 47, the critic Philip Carr said she was "an actress with a beautiful diction and a fine voice, a noble dignity and simplicity of emotion and an absolute sense of consecration to her art."
