= Marthe Vinot =

French actress (1894–1974)

Marthe Vinot (French: [maʁt vino]; née Lagrange [laɡʁɑ̃ʒ]; 8 December 1894 – 13 July 1974) was a French actress whose film career began in the early years of silent film and lasted until the early 1920s.

== Life and career ==
Marthe Vinot was born Marthe Lagrange in Paris. She was married to French film and stage actor Maurice Vinot who was killed in an aeroplane crash in 1916 during World War I whilst enlisted in the French military. She then married actor and director Pierre Blanchar, with whom she had a daughter, actress Dominique Blanchar.

Her sister was fellow actress Louise Lagrange who married Maurice Tourneur.

She made a career in the early days of silent films and retired from the screen in 1924. Her first film role was in the Louis Feuillade-directed film André Chénier in 1909 for Gaumont. It would be the first of many collaborations with Feuillade. Marthe Vinot died in Paris in 1974.

== Partial filmography ==
- La Suspicion (1911, directed by Louis Feuillade)
- André Chénier (1911, Short, directed by Louis Feuillade)
- Le Destin des meres (1912, Short, directed by Louis Feuillade)
- Le Mort vivant (1912, Short, directed by Louis Feuillade)
- Les Cloches de Pâques (1912, Short, directed by Louis Feuillade)
- La Maison des lions (1912, Short, directed by Louis Feuillade)
- Le Château de la peur (1912, Short, directed by Louis Feuillade)
- Le proscrit (1912, Short, directed by Louis Feuillade)
- La Préméditation (1912, Short, directed by Louis Feuillade)
- Le Nain (1912, Short, directed by Louis Feuillade)
- L'Anneau fatal (1912, Short, directed by Louis Feuillade) - Laure Gerbier
- Bébé et la Gouvernante (1912, Short, directed by Louis Feuillade)
- Bébé et le Financier (1912, Short, directed by Louis Feuillade)
- Bébé, Bout de Zan et le Voleur (1912, Short, directed by Louis Feuillade)
- Les Yeux ouverts (1912, Short, directed by Louis Feuillade)
- La Douleur de Chopin (1912, directed by Louis Feuillade)
- Les Yeux qui meurent (1913, Short, directed by Louis Feuillade)
- Le Mariage de Miss Nelly (1913, Short, directed by Louis Feuillade)
- L'Angoisse (1913, Short, directed by Louis Feuillade)
- Bout de Zan chanteur ambulant (1913, Short, directed by Louis Feuillade)
- Juve contre Fantômas (1913, directed by Louis Feuillade) - (uncredited)
- L'Effroi (1913, directed by Louis Feuillade)
- Severo Torelli (1914, directed by Louis Feuillade)
- Le Calvaire (1914, Short, directed by Louis Feuillade)
- Les Fiancés de Séville (1914, directed by Louis Feuillade)
- L'Escapade de Filoche (1915, directed by Louis Feuillade)
- Son or (1915, Short, directed by Gaston Ravel)
- Madame Fleur de Neige (1915, Short, directed by Gaston Ravel)
- Le Blason (1915, Short, directed by Louis Feuillade)
- Jeunes filles d'hier et d'aujourd'hui (1915, directed by Louis Feuillade)
- Le Collier de perles (1915, directed by Louis Feuillade)
- Un mariage de raison (1916, directed by Louis Feuillade)
- Le Crépuscule du cœur (1916, directed by Maurice Mariaud)
- La Danseuse voilée (1916, directed by Maurice Mariaud)
- L'Obstacle (1918, directed by Jean Kemm)
- Le Gage (1920, directed by Paul Barlatier) - Blanche Decoeur
- La Falaise (1920, directed by Paul Barlatier)
- Fleur des neiges (1921, directed by Paul Barlatier)
- Le Sang d'Allah (1921, directed by Luitz-Morat) - La soeur de Jack
- La Proie (1921, directed by Marcel Dumont)
- Vingt ans après (1922, directed by Henri Diamant-Berger)
- Surcouf (1925, directed by Luitz-Morat) - (final film role)
