= Dominique Blanchar =

French actress (1927–2018)

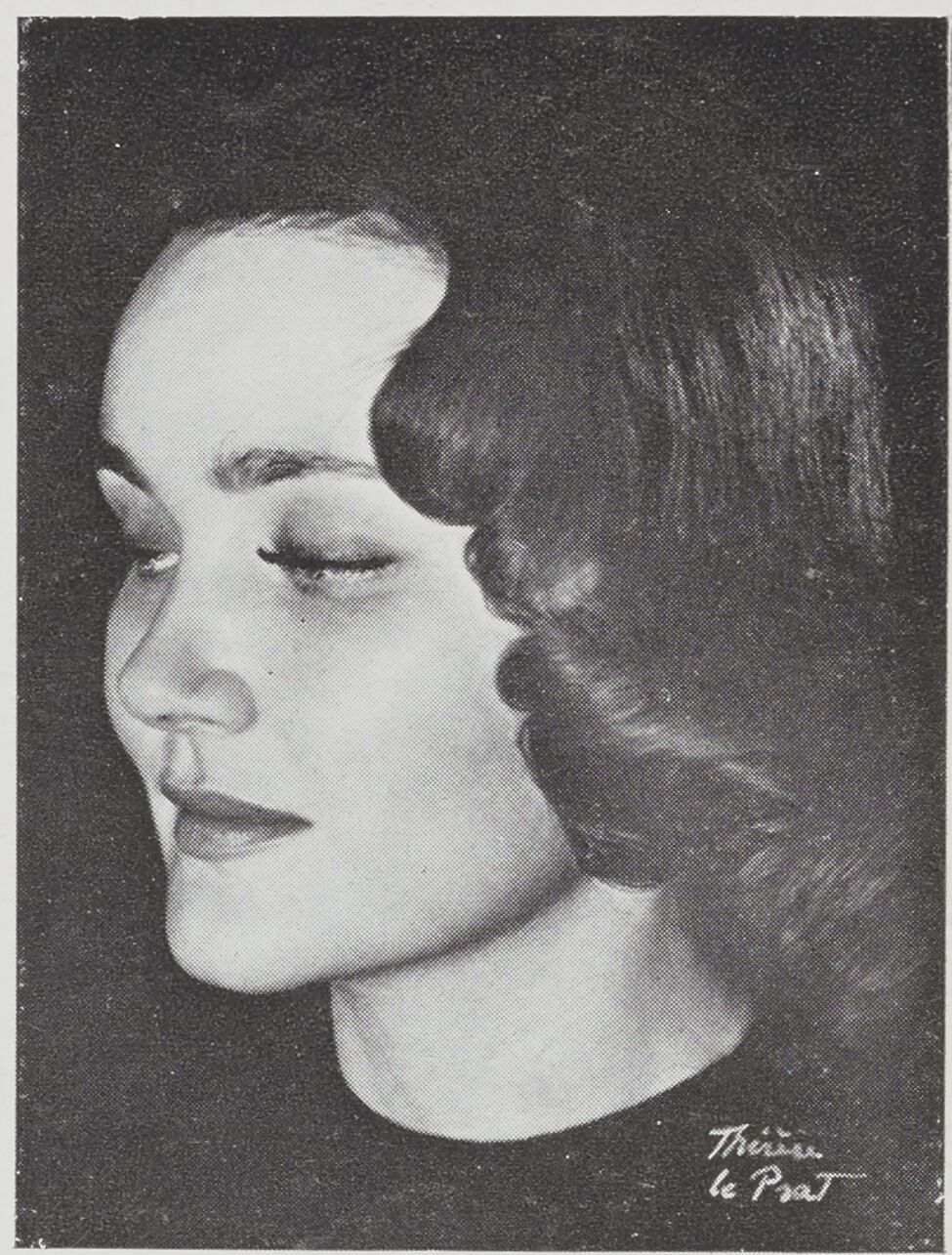
- Born: Dominique Marie Thérèse Blanchard; 2 June 1927; Paris, France
- Died: 19 November 2018 (aged 91); Paris, France
- Occupation: Actor
- Years active: 1947–2006
- Spouse: Jean Servais (m. 1952; died 1976)
- Parent(s): Pierre Blanchar; Marthe Vinot

Dominique Blanchar (French pronunciation: [dɔminik blɑ̃ʃaʁ]; born Dominique Marie Thérèse Blanchard; 2 June 1927 – 19 November 2018) was a French actress in stage, television, and film. She won two Molière Awards.

== Personal life ==
Dominique Blanchar was born in Paris, the daughter of actors Pierre Blanchar and Marthe Vinot.

Blanchar was married to the Belgian actor Jean Servais, until his death in 1976.

She died on 19 November 2018 at the age of 91.

== Career ==
Blanchar acted in both French and English language films.

=== Selected filmography ===
Year	Title	Role	Notes
1949	The Secret of Mayerling	Marie Vetsera	
1951	Decision Before Dawn	Monique	
1952	The Song of Sister Maria	Sor María de la Asunción	
1959	Drôles de phénomènes	Anny Volland	
1959	Ce corps tant désiré	La fille	
1960	L'Avventura	Giulia	
1981	Strange Affair	La mère de Louis	
1992	Bella vista		

=== Awards ===
Blanchar won the Molière Award for Best Supporting Actress twice for her roles in Tout comme il faut (As Better, Better Than Before) in 1997 and Les Femmes Savantes (The Learned Ladies) in 2000.
