= Maurice Vinot =

French actor

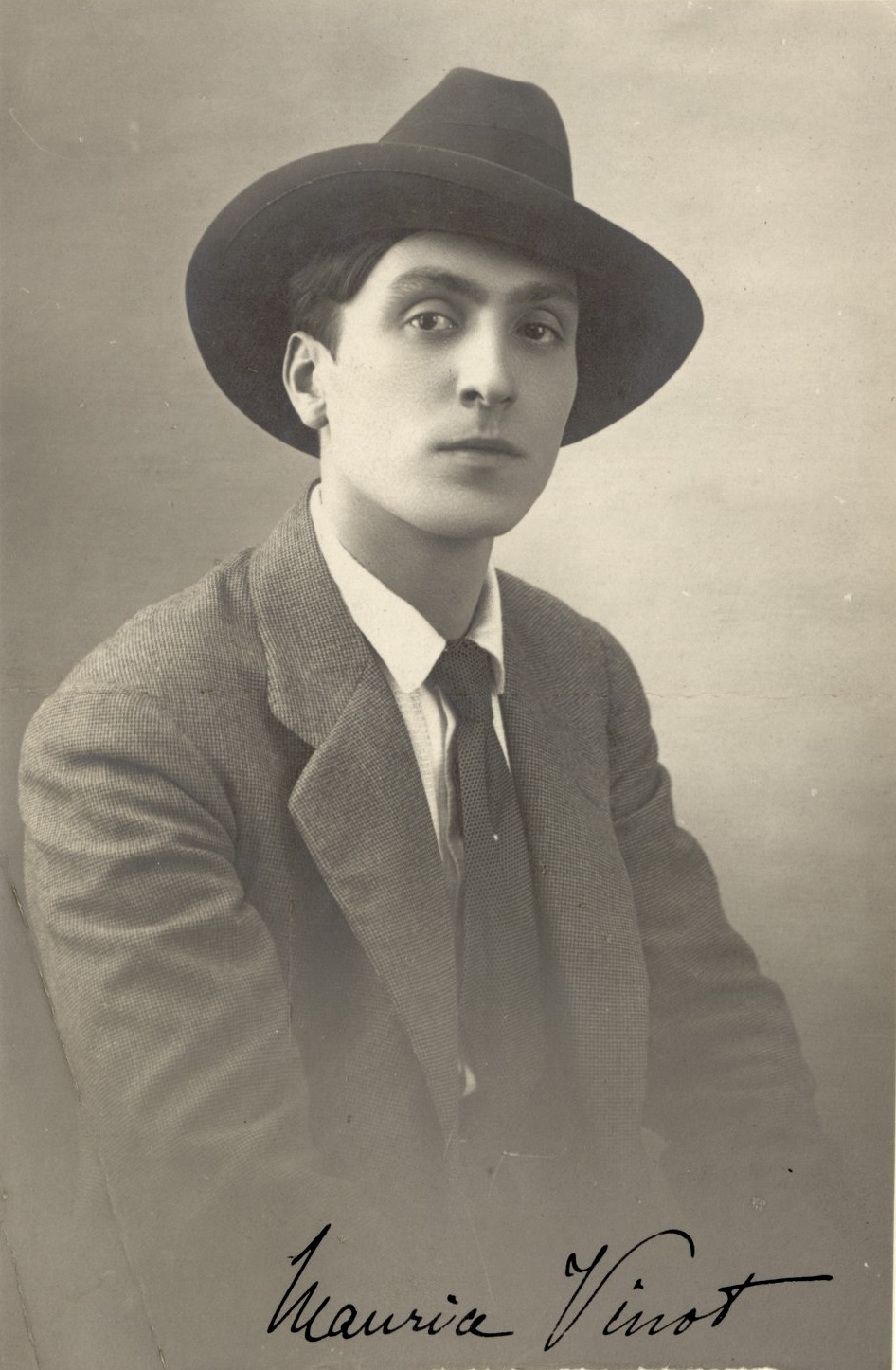
- Born: 3 November 1888; Paris, Île-de-France, France
- Died: 23 June 1916 (aged 27); Pontlevoy, Loir-et-Cher, France
- Occupation: Actor
- Years active: 1907 – 1914
- Spouse: Marthe Vinot (née Lagrange) (m. 1913)

Maurice Vinot (French: [mɔʁis vino]; 3 November 1888 – 23 June 1916) was a French film actor of the early 20th-century whose career ended early in 1916 when he was killed in an airplane accident in Pontlevoy, France after enlisting in the military to fight in World War I.

== Early life and career ==
Maurice Vinot was born in the 11th arrondissement of Paris in 1888. He began his film career as a protégée of director Louis Feuillade in 1908 and would go on to appear in approximately two-hundred motion pictures; the bulk of them being films directed by Feuillade. His first known film role was in the 1908 Feuillade directed short Le Récit du colonel opposite actresses Renée Carl and Alice Tissot. Vinot would follow this with a number of other short films released in 1908 in roles directed by Feuillade and again, sharing billing with Carl and Tissot. Vinot would work steadily in films until 1914 and the outbreak of World War I when he enlisted in the newly created French Air Force, obtaining the rank of Private, 2nd Class. His final film appearance was in the Gérard Bourgeois directed Protéa IV ou Les mystères du château de Malmort, filmed in 1914 and released posthumously in 1917.

== Death ==
While undergoing flight training at the Tours aviation school (now, the Tours Aerodrome), Vinot became the first casualty of the air base when his Caudron G.3 crashed on 23 June 1916 near Pontlevoy. A contemporary witness stated the plane was at 30 meters altitude when it suddenly crashed into the ground. Vinot was killed instantly and another airman, Mousson, was severely injured. Vinot was 27 years-old. A "street", the second on the left after passing the portal of the military aviation school in Tours, later bore the name rue Vinot in his honour.

== Personal life ==
Vinot was married to actress Marthe Vinot (née Lagrange) in 1913. The two had appeared opposite one another in a number of films.

== Selected filmography ==
Year	Title	Role	Notes
1908	Le devoir		
1909	Les heures - Épisode 4: Le soir, la nuit		
1909	Les heures - Épisode 2: Le matin, le jour		
1909	Les heures - Épisode 3: Midi, la vesprée, le crépuscule		
1909	Un premier amour		
1909	Une femme pour deux maris		
1909	Matelot		
1909	Le voile des nymphes		
1909	Le miroir hypnotique		
1909	Le fou		
1909	La princesse d'Ys		
1912	Le proscrit	Le prince Georges de Messénie	
1914	Protéa II ou Protéa et l'auto infernale		
1917	Protéa IV ou Les mystères du château de Malmort		(final film role)
