= Pierre Blanchar =

French actor (1892–1963)

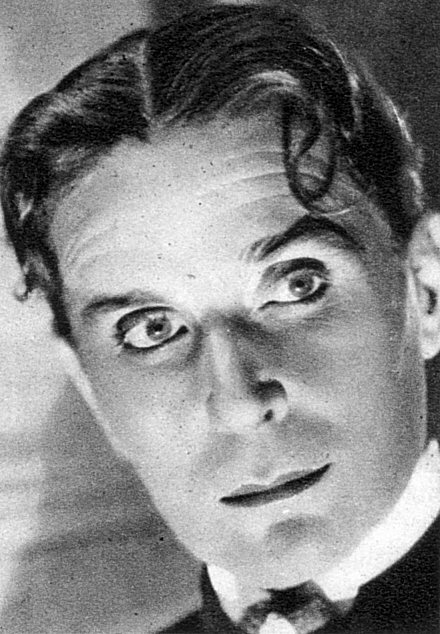
- Blanchar in the 1937 Italian film The Former Mattia Pascal
- Born: 30 June 1892; Philippeville, French Algeria (now Skikda, Algeria)
- Died: 21 November 1963 (aged 71); Suresnes, France
- Occupation: Actor
- Years active: 1922–1961

Pierre Blanchar (French pronunciation: [pjɛʁ blɑ̃ʃaʁ]; 30 June 1892 – 21 November 1963) was a French actor. He appeared in more than 50 films between 1922 and 1961. Blanchar was married to actress Marthe Vinot, with whom he had a daughter, actress Dominique Blanchar. He played Napoleon in the 1938 British film A Royal Divorce alongside Ruth Chatterton as Josephine. He later appeared alongside Michèle Morgan in the 1946 film Pastoral Symphony.

== Selected filmography ==
- The Gardens of Murcia (1923)
- The Thruster (1924)
- The Promised Land (1925)
- Le Joueur d'échecs (1927)
- The Farewell Waltz (1928)
- The Wedding March (1929)
- Captain Fracasse (1929)
- Les Croix de bois (1932)
- The Beautiful Sailor (1932)
- L'Atlantide (1932)
- The Old Devil (1933)
- At the End of the World (1934)
- The Devil in the Bottle (1935)
- Crime and Punishment (1935)
- Lovers and Thieves (1935)
- The Volga Boatman (1936)
- Street of Shadows (1937)
- Culprit (1937)
- The Former Mattia Pascal (1937)
- Life Dances On (1937)
- The Man from Nowhere (1937)
- A Royal Divorce (1938)
- The Strange Monsieur Victor (1938)
- Night in December (1940)
- The Snow on the Footsteps (1942)
- Colonel Pontcarral (1942)
- Secrets (1943)
- La Liberation de Paris (1944)
- Pastoral Symphony (1946)
- Patrie (1946)
- Le Bataillon du ciel (1947)
- After Love (1948)
- Doctor Laennec (1949)
- The Cupid Club (1949)
- My Friend Sainfoin (1950)

== Bibliography ==
- O'Brien, Scott. Ruth Chatterton, Actress, Aviator, Author. BearManor Media, 2013.
- Palmer, Tim & Michael, Charlie. Directory of World Cinema: France. Intellect Books, 2013.
