= The Naked Truth (1914 film) =

1914 film directed by Carmine Gallone

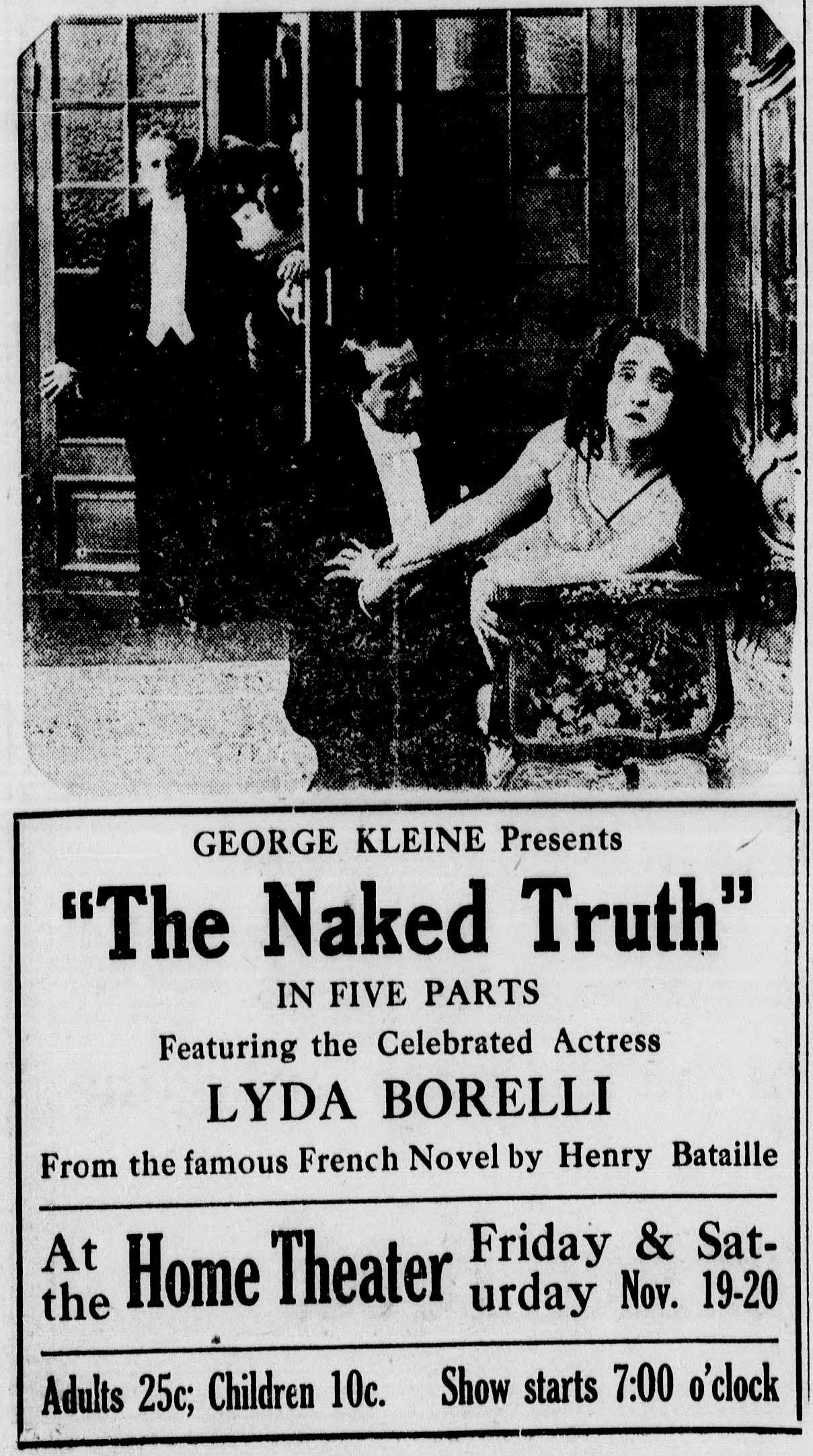
- An American newspaper advertisement
- Directed by: Carmine Gallone
- Written by: Henry Bataille (play); Carmine Gallone
- Starring: Lyda Borelli
- Cinematography: Domenico Grimaldi
- Release date: 1914
- Running time: 60 minutes
- Country: Italy
- Language: Silent

The Naked Truth (Italian: La donna nuda) is a 1914 silent Italian drama film directed by Carmine Gallone.

== Cast ==
- Lyda Borelli as Lolette
- Ruggero Capodaglio
- Wanda Capodaglio as Principessa
- Lamberto Picasso as Pierre Bernier
- Ugo Piperno as Rouchard

== Reception ==
The film addresses the theme of the ”diva” and ”avoids exotic references in favor of the bohemian world of artists and models , a milieu inspired by Paris and Montmartre.”

The film seems to have been popular outside of Italy as well.
