= Slapstick film =

Film genre

Slapstick films are comedy films using slapstick humor, a physical comedy that includes pratfalls, tripping, falling, practical jokes, and mistakes are highlighted over dialogue, plot and character development. The physical comedy in these films contains a cartoonish style of violence that is predominantly harmless and goofy in tone.

== History ==
Silent film had slapstick comedies that included the films starring Buster Keaton, Charlie Chaplin, the Keystone Cops and Harold Lloyd. These comedians often laced their slapstick with social commentary while comedians such as Abbott and Costello, Laurel and Hardy and The Three Stooges did not. Slapstick is about uninhibited action and timing, which may include being made to look foolish or to act with tomfoolery.

There were fewer slapstick comedies produced at the advent of sound film. After World War II, the genre resurfaced in France with films by Jacques Tati and in the United States with films It's a Mad, Mad, Mad, Mad World and The Great Race, starring the stoic, aloof and mild mannered Buster Keaton, also known as "The Great Stone Face", as well as the films of comedians like Jerry Lewis.

In the 1970s, Jackie Chan revived slapstick comedy in Hong Kong action cinema. His brand of action comedy combines the martial arts film genre with physical slapstick comedy and stunt work. He pioneered this style of slapstick martial arts comedy with films such as Drunken Master (1978) and Project A (1983).

== Slapstick films and television series ==
Slapstick films and television series include:

=== 1910s ===
- The Rink (1916)

=== 1920s ===
- The Scarecrow (1920)
- Safety Last! (1923)
- Sherlock Jr. (1924)
- The Gold Rush (1925)
- The General (1926)
- Big Business (1929)
- Mickey Mouse (1929–1953)

=== 1930s ===
- Looney Tunes (1930–1969, 1980–present)
- Merrie Melodies (1931–1969)
- City Lights (1931)
- Duck Soup (1933)
- Lightning Strikes Twice (1935)
- A Night at the Opera (1935)
- Modern Times (1936)
- Way Out West (1937)
- Donald Duck (1937–1965)
- A Day at the Races (1937)

=== 1940s ===
- The Great Dictator (1940)
- Whistling in the Dark (1941)
- Crazy Knights (1944)
- Tom and Jerry (1940–present)

=== 1950s ===
- Fancy Pants (1950)
- The Good Humor Man (1950)
- The Fuller Brush Girl (1950)
- Mr. Hulot's Holiday (1953)
- The Court Jester (1955)
- Just My Luck (1957)
- Mon Oncle (1958)
- Have Rocket, Will Travel (1959)
- The Battle of the Sexes (1959)

=== 1960s ===
- The Bellboy (1960)
- Two-Way Stretch (1960)
- The Absent-Minded Professor (1961)
- One Hundred and One Dalmatians (1961)
- The Ladies Man (1961)
- Everything's Ducky (1961)
- The Errand Boy (1961)
- Invasion Quartet (1961)
- It's Only Money (1962)
- On the Beat (1962)
- The Notorious Landlady (1962)
- Who's Minding the Store? (1963)
- It's a Mad, Mad, Mad, Mad World (1963)
- The Nutty Professor (1963)
- It's a Mad, Mad, Mad, Mad World (1963)
- The Pink Panther (1963)
- Carry On Spying (1964)
- Advance to the Rear (1964)
- A Shot in the Dark (1964)
- Carry On Cleo (1964)
- Man's Favorite Sport? (1964)
- The Disorderly Orderly (1964)
- West and Soda (1965)
- Operation Y and Shurik's Other Adventures (1965)
- The Great Race (1965)
- Batman (1966)
- Get Smart (1965–1970)
- That Riviera Touch (1966)
- Three on a Couch (1966)
- Who Wants to Kill Jessie? (1966)
- The Glass Bottom Boat (1966)
- A Funny Thing Happened on the Way to the Forum (1966)
- Boy, Did I Get a Wrong Number! (1966)
- Who Wants to Kill Jessie? (1966)
- The Glass Bottom Boat (1966)
- A Funny Thing Happened on the Way to the Forum (1966)
- Carry On Doctor (1967)
- Carry On Again, Doctor (1967)
- The Reluctant Astronaut (1967)
- The Magnificent Two (1967)
- The Party (1968)
- Inspector Clouseau (1968)
- Blackbeard's Ghost (1968)
- VIP my Brother Superman (1968)
- Take the Money and Run (1969)
- Monty Python's Flying Circus (1969–1974)

=== 1970s ===
- The Boatniks (1970)
- Bananas (1971)
- Trafic (1971)
- Evil Roy Slade (1972)
- Carry On Abroad (1972)
- My Name Is Nobody (1973)
- Mr. Hercules Against Karate (1973)
- El Chapulín Colorado (1973-1979)
- El Chavo del Ocho (1973-1980)
- Sleeper (1973)
- Blazing Saddles (1974)
- Young Frankenstein (1974)
- The Fortune (1975)
- The Return of the Pink Panther (1975)
- Monty Python and the Holy Grail (1975)
- The Pink Panther Strikes Again (1976)
- Allegro Non Troppo (1976)
- Mr. Rossi Looks for Happiness (1976)
- Slap Shot (1977)
- Mr. Rossi's Dreams (1977)
- Drunken Master (1978)
- Revenge of the Pink Panther (1978)
- Mr. Rossi's Vacation (1978)
- Up in Smoke (1978)
- The Jerk (1979)
- 1941 (1979)
- The Kentucky Fried Movie (1979)

=== 1980s ===
- Caddyshack (1980)
- The Nude Bomb (1980)
- Airplane! (1980)
- Hardly Working (1981), surreal slapstick
- The Gods Must Be Crazy (1981)
- History of the World, Part I (1981)
- Trail of the Pink Panther (1982)
- Slapstick of Another Kind (1982)
- Police Squad! (1982)
- Airplane II: The Sequel (1982)
- National Lampoon's Vacation (1983)
- Project A (1983)
- Inspector Gadget (1983–1985)
- Curse of the Pink Panther (1983)
- Blackadder (1983–1989)
- Wheels on Meals (1984)
- Police Academy (1984)
- National Lampoon's European Vacation (1985)
- Police Academy 2: Their First Assignment (1985)
- Dr. Otto and the Riddle of the Gloom Beam (1985)
- Clue (1985)
- Police Story (1985)
- Armour of God (1986)
- Mr. Vampire (1986), horror-comedy
- Club Paradise (1986)
- Stoogemania (1986)
- Sledge Hammer! (1986–1988)
- Police Academy 3: Back in Training (1986)
- Big Trouble in Little China (1986)
- Spaceballs (1987)
- Munchies (1987), horror-comedy
- Ernest Goes to Camp (1987)
- Police Academy 4: Citizens on Patrol (1987)
- Beetlejuice (1988), horror-comedy
- Police Story 2 (1988)
- The Naked Gun: From the Files of Police Squad! (1988)
- Caddyshack II (1988)
- Who Framed Roger Rabbit (1988)
- Garfield and Friends (1988–1994)
- Police Academy 5: Assignment Miami Beach (1988)
- A Fish Called Wanda (1988)
- Slime City (1988)
- The Wrong Guys (1988)
- Arthur 2 (1988)
- Hey Vern, It's Ernest! (1988)
- Dirty Rotten Scoundrels (1988)
- I'm Gonna Git You Sucka (1988)
- Ernest Saves Christmas (1988)
- Miracles (1989)
- See No Evil, Hear No Evil (1989)
- Police Academy 6: City Under Siege (1989)
- UHF (1989)
- Sweet Home (1989)
- Get Smart, Again! (1989)
- Major League (1989)
- The Simpsons (1989–present)
- National Lampoon's Christmas Vacation (1989)

=== 1990s ===
- Mr. Bean (1990–1995)
- Tiny Toon Adventures (1990–1993)
- Home Alone (1990)
- Ernest Goes to Jail (1990)
- Gremlins 2: The New Batch (1990)
- Problem Child (1990)
- Repossessed (1990)
- Armour of God II: Operation Condor (1991)
- Problem Child 2 (1991)
- Hudson Hawk (1991)
- Nothing But Trouble (1991)
- The Addams Family (1991)
- The Naked Gun 2 1/2: The Smell of Fear (1991)
- Drop Dead Fred (1991)
- Bottom (1991-1995)
- Darkwing Duck (1991–1992)
- The Ren & Stimpy Show (1991–1996)
- Teenage Mutant Ninja Turtles II: The Secret of the Ooze (1991)
- Ghoulies III: Ghoulies Go to College (1991)
- Hot Shots! (1991)
- Ernest Scared Stupid (1991)
- Revenge of the Nerds III: The Next Generation (1992)
- Brain Donors (1992)
- Aladdin (1992)
- Wayne's World (1992)
- Home Alone 2: Lost in New York (1992)
- Police Story 3: Supercop (1992)
- Super Dave: Daredevil for Hire (1992)
- Eek the Cat (1992–1997)
- Addams Family Values (1993)
- Army of Darkness (1993)
- Beverly Hillbillies (1993)
- Son of the Pink Panther (1993)
- Ernest Rides Again (1993)
- Wayne's World 2 (1993)
- Dennis the Menace (1993)
- Hocus Pocus (1993)
- Robin Hood: Men in Tights (1993)
- Surf Ninjas (1993)
- Rocko's Modern Life (1993–1996)
- Bonkers (1993–1994)
- So I Married an Axe Murderer (1993)
- Animaniacs (1993–1998)
- 2 Stupid Dogs (1993–1994)
- Teenage Mutant Ninja Turtles III (1993)
- Hot Shots! Part Deux (1993)
- Coneheads (1993)
- Cannibal! The Musical (1993)
- Ace Ventura: Pet Detective (1994)
- Drunken Master II (1994)
- Police Academy: Mission to Moscow (1994)
- Baby's Day Out (1994)
- Revenge of the Nerds IV: Nerds in Love (1994)
- The Silence of the Hams (1994)
- Dumb and Dumber (1994)
- The Mask (1994)
- It's Pat (1994)
- Ernest Goes to School (1994)
- Naked Gun 33 1/3: The Final Insult (1994)
- The Santa Clause (1994)
- In the Army Now (1994)
- Major League II (1994)
- The Shnookums and Meat Funny Cartoon Show (1995)
- Timon & Pumbaa (1995–1999)
- The World of Lee Evans (1995)
- Earthworm Jim (1995–1996)
- What a Cartoon! (1995–1997)
- Slam Dunk Ernest (1995)
- Billy Madison (1995)
- Dracula: Dead and Loving It (1995)
- Ace Ventura: When Nature Calls (1995)
- Tommy Boy (1995)
- Casper (1995)
- Dexter’s Laboratory (1996-2003)
- 3rd Rock from the Sun (1996–2001)
- Happy Gilmore (1996)
- Spy Hard (1996)
- The Spooktacular New Adventures of Casper (1996–1998)
- The Nutty Professor (1996)
- KaBlam! (1996–2000)
- Space Jam (1996)
- Black Sheep (1996)
- 101 Dalmatians (1996)
- Bio-Dome (1996)
- Don't Be a Menace to South Central While Drinking Your Juice in the Hood (1996)
- George of the Jungle (1997)
- Flubber (1997)
- Hercules (1997)
- Ernest Goes to Africa (1997)
- The Wacky World of Tex Avery (1997)
- Vegas Vacation (1997)
- South Park (1997–present)
- Beverly Hills Ninja (1997)
- Home Alone 3 (1997)
- Liar Liar (1997)
- Good Burger (1997)
- The Good Bad Guy (1997)
- Cats Don't Dance (1997)
- Bean (1997)
- MouseHunt (1997)
- Mr. Magoo (1997)
- Cow and Chicken (1997–1999)
- I Am Weasel (1997–2000)
- Austin Powers (1997)
- The Angry Beavers (1997–2001)
- Orgazmo (1997)
- There's Something About Mary (1998)
- Le Dîner de Cons (1998)
- Jane Austen's Mafia! (1998)
- Wrongfully Accused (1998)
- Ernest in the Army (1998)
- Histeria! (1998–2000)
- CatDog (1998–2005)
- Oggy and the Cockroaches (1998–2019)
- Rush Hour (1998)
- The Waterboy (1998)
- Quest for Camelot (1998)
- Inspector Gadget (1999)
- Guest House Paradiso (1999)
- The New Woody Woodpecker Show (1999–2002)
- Family Guy (1999–present)
- Mickey Mouse Works (1999–2000)
- SpongeBob SquarePants (1999–present)
- Ed, Edd n Eddy (1999–2009)
- Deuce Bigalow: Male Gigolo (1999)
- Dudley Do-Right (1999)
- The All New Adventures of Laurel & Hardy in For Love or Mummy (1999)
- Screw Loose (1999)
- South Park: Bigger, Longer and Uncut (1999)
- Asterix and Obelix vs. Caesar (1999)
- Courage the Cowardly Dog (1999–2002)
- Rock N Roll Frankenstein (1999)

=== 2000s ===
- Big Money Hustlas (2000)
- Malcolm in the Middle (2000-2006)
- The Adventures of Rocky and Bullwinkle (2000)
- Teacher's Pet (2000–2002)
- Shanghai Noon (2000)
- Me, Myself & Irene (2000)
- Nutty Professor II: The Klumps (2000)
- Scary Movie (2000), horror-comedy
- 2001: A Space Travesty (2000)
- Shriek If You Know What I Did Last Friday the Thirteenth (2000), horror-comedy
- The Emperor's New Groove (2000)
- How the Grinch Stole Christmas (2000)
- 102 Dalmatians (2000)
- Meet the Parents (2000)
- Little Nicky (2000)
- Joe Dirt (2001)
- Zoolander (2001)
- Tomcats (2001), gross-out, sex-comedy
- Rush Hour 2 (2001)
- Super Troopers (2001)
- So What Now? (2001)
- Scary Movie 2 (2001), horror-comedy
- The Fairly OddParents (2001–2017)
- The Ripping Friends (2001–2002)
- Monsters, Inc. (2001)
- Pure Luck (2001)
- The Animal (2001)
- Elvira's Haunted Hills (2001)
- Rat Race (2001)
- Shrek (2001)
- Der Schuh des Manitu (2001)
- Freddy Got Fingered (2001)
- La Tour Montparnasse Infernale (2001)
- I Am Sam (2001)
- Not Another Teen Movie (2001)
- The Adventures of Jimmy Neutron, Boy Genius (2002–2006)
- Larryboy: The Cartoon Adventures (2002)
- A Town Called Panic (2002–2003)
- Ice Age (2002)
- Asterix and Obelix: Mission Cleopatra (2002)
- Mr Bean: The Animated Series (2002–present)
- The Master of Disguise (2002)
- The Hot Chick (2002)
- Stealing Harvard (2002)
- Ali G Indahouse (2002)
- Home Alone 4: Taking Back the Home (2002)
- Kung Pow! Enter the Fist (2002)
- Evil Con Carne (2003–2004)
- George of the Jungle 2 (2003)
- Dumb and Dumberer: When Harry Met Lloyd (2003)
- Old School (2003)
- Bruce Almighty (2003)
- The Grim Adventures of Billy & Mandy (2003–2007)
- Inspector Gadget 2 (2003)
- Ren & Stimpy "Adult Party Cartoon" (2003)
- Johnny English (2003)
- 7 Zwerge – Männer allein im Wald (2003)
- Looney Tunes: Back in Action (2003)
- Shanghai Knights (2003)
- The Cat in the Hat (2003)
- Scary Movie 3 (2003), horror-comedy
- Drake and Josh (2004-2007)
- Shrek 2 (2004)
- Brandy & Mr. Whiskers (2004–2006)
- Danny Phantom (2004–2007)
- Megas XLR (2004–2005)
- The SpongeBob SquarePants Movie (2004)
- Team America: World Police (2004)
- Meet The Fockers (2004)
- Kung Fu Hustle (2004)
- Hi Hi Puffy AmiYumi (2004–2006)
- White Chicks (2004)
- My Gym Partner's a Monkey (2005–2008)
- Madagascar (2005)
- Catscratch (2005–2007)
- Deuce Bigalow: European Gigolo (2005)
- Bob the Butler (2005)
- Fun with Dick and Jane (2005)
- Son of the Mask (2005)
- Camp Lazlo (2005–2008)
- Evil Aliens (2006), horror-comedy
- Nacho Libre (2006)
- Scary Movie 4 (2006), horror-comedy
- Borat (2006)
- The Pink Panther (2006)
- Ice Age: The Meltdown (2006)
- Open Season (2006)
- 7 Zwerge – Der Wald ist nicht genug (2006)
- Barnyard (2006)
- Night at the Museum (2006)
- Little Man (2006)
- El Chavo Animado (2006-2014)
- El Tigre: The Adventures of Manny Rivera (2007–2008)
- Rush Hour 3 (2007)
- Mr. Bean's Holiday (2007)
- Back at the Barnyard (2007–2011)
- Kickin' It Old Skool (2007)
- Evan Almighty (2007)
- Epic Movie (2007)
- Bratz (2007)
- Norbit (2007)
- Big Stan (2007)
- Shrek the Third (2007)
- Phineas & Ferb (2007–present)
- Alvin and the Chipmunks (2007)
- Balls Out: The Gary Houseman Story (2008)
- Asterix at the Olympic Games (2008)
- Superhero Movie (2008)
- The Love Guru (2008)
- Open Season 2 (2008)
- Meet the Spartans (2008)
- Get Smart (2008)
- Madagascar: Escape 2 Africa (2008)
- Disaster Movie (2008)
- The Penguins of Madagascar (2008–2015)
- Black Dynamite (2009)
- Bibi Blocksberg (2009)
- Suck (2009)
- The Pink Panther 2 (2009)
- Brüno (2009)
- Alvin and the Chipmunks: The Squeakquel (2009)
- Ace Ventura Jr.: Pet Detective (2009)
- A Town Called Panic (2009)
- Ice Age: Dawn of the Dinosaurs (2009)
- Night at the Museum: Battle of the Smithsonian (2009)
- Cloudy with a Chance of Meatballs (2009)

=== 2010s ===
- Big Money Rustlas (2010)
- Strawberry Shortcake's Berry Bitty Adventures (2010–2015)
- My Little Pony: Friendship Is Magic (2010–2019)
- Open Season 3 (2010)
- Vampires Suck (2010)
- Despicable Me (2010)
- Grown Ups (2010)
- Planet Sheen (2010–2013)
- T.U.F.F. Puppy (2010–2015)
- Furry Vengeance (2010)
- Zig and Sharko (2010–2024)
- Shrek Forever After (2010)
- Jack and Jill (2011)
- The Amazing World of Gumball (2011–2019)
- Enchufe.tv (2011-present)
- Johnny English Reborn (2011)
- Alvin and the Chipmunks: Chipwrecked (2011)
- Little Fockers (2011)
- Littlest Pet Shop (2012–2016)
- Robot and Monster (2012–2015)
- Ted (2012)
- Brickleberry (2012–2015)
- That's My Boy (2012)
- The Dictator (2012)
- Ice Age: Continental Drift (2012)
- Madagascar 3: Europe's Most Wanted (2012)
- Home Alone: The Holiday Heist (2012)
- Asterix and Obelix: God Save Britannia (2012)
- The Three Stooges (2012)
- Hotel Transylvania (2012)
- Mickey Mouse (2013–2019)
- Despicable Me 2 (2013)
- Grown Ups 2 (2013)
- Scary Movie 5 (2013)
- Cloudy with a Chance of Meatballs 2 (2013)
- A Haunted House (2013)
- 22 Jump Street (2014)
- Kamen Rider × Kamen Rider Drive & Gaim: Movie War Full Throttle (2014)
- Night at the Museum: Secret of the Tomb (2014)
- A Million Ways to Die in the West (2014)
- The Tom and Jerry Show (2014–2021)
- A Haunted House 2 (2014)
- Penguins of Madagascar (2014)
- Mortadelo and Filemon: Mission Implausible (2014)
- Dumb and Dumber To (2014)
- Superfast! (2015)
- El Chapulín Colorado Animado (2015-2017)
- New Looney Tunes (2015–2020)
- Minions (2015)
- Vacation (2015)
- Open Season: Scared Silly (2015)
- Alvin and the Chipmunks: The Road Chip (2015)
- Ted 2 (2015)
- Hotel Transylvania 2 (2015)
- Bunnicula (2016–2018)
- Fifty Shades of Black (2016)
- Grimsby (2016)
- Ice Age: Collision Course (2016)
- La Tour 2 contrôle infernale (2016)
- Unikitty! (2017–2020)
- Chuck's Choice (2017)
- Despicable Me 3 (2017)
- Bunsen Is a Beast (2017–2018)
- The Boss Baby (2017)
- Captain Underpants: The First Epic Movie (2017)
- Woody Woodpecker (2017)
- The Death of Stalin (2017)
- Cloudy with a Chance of Meatballs (2017–2022)
- Hotel Transylvania: The Series (2017–2020)
- Big City Greens (2018–present)
- Paradise PD (2018–2022)
- Hotel Transylvania 3: Summer Vacation (2018)
- Johnny English Strikes Again (2018)
- The Boss Baby: Back in Business (2018–2021)
- The Epic Tales of Captain Underpants (2018–2020)
- Holmes & Watson (2018)
- Woody Woodpecker (2018–2022)
- Harvey Girls Forever! (2018–2020)
- Amphibia (2019–2022)
- Total Dhamaal (2019)

=== 2020s ===
- Animaniacs (2020–2023)
- Looney Tunes Cartoons (2020–2024)
- Borat Subsequent Moviefilm (2020)
- The Wonderful World of Mickey Mouse (2020–2023)
- Tom & Jerry (2021)
- Jellystone! (2021–2025)
- Space Jam: A New Legacy (2021)
- Tom and Jerry Special Shorts (2021)
- Tom and Jerry in New York (2021)
- The Ghost and Molly McGee (2021–2024)
- The Patrick Star Show (2021–present)
- Hotel Transylvania: Transformania (2022)
- The Cuphead Show! (2022)
- Hundreds of Beavers (2022)
- Farzar (2022)
- The Ice Age Adventures of Buck Wild (2022)
- Minions: The Rise of Gru (2022)
- Man vs Bee (2022)
- Jackass Forever (2022)
- Tiny Toons Looniversity (2023–2025)
- History of the World, Part II (2023)
- Asterix & Obelix: The Middle Kingdom (2023)
- The Amazing Digital Circus (2023–2026)
- Despicable Me 4 (2024)
- Woody Woodpecker Goes to Camp (2024)
- The Garfield Movie (2024)
- Happy Gilmore 2 (2025)
- The Naked Gun (2025)
- Fackham Hall (2025)
- Man vs Baby (2025)
- Los Colorado (2025–2026)
- Hoppers (2026)
- Scary Movie (2026)
- Jackass: Best and Last (2026)

== See also ==
- List of slapstick comedy topics
- Slapstick, the eponymous device, used by Harlequin in Commedia
- Mo lei tau, a genre of slapstick comedy in Hong Kong cinema
- Modernist film
- Postmodernist film
