= 1976 in animation =

Events in 1976 in animation.

== Events ==
=== March ===
- March 12: Bruno Bozzetto's Allegro Non Troppo premieres. It will become a cult classic.
- March 16: The Peanuts special It's Arbor Day, Charlie Brown airs, marking this as Vince Guaraldi's final composition for the Peanuts special, which aired one month after his death. The popular "Linus and Lucy" theme was continued in his memory.
- March 29: 48th Academy Awards: Great by Bob Godfrey wins the Academy Award for Best Animated Short Film.
- Specific date unknown: The first episode of Jamie and the Magic Torch airs.

=== June ===
- June 20: Don Jurwich's Once Upon a Girl, an adult pornographic film that mixes live-action and animation, premieres.

==== July ====
- July 21: William Hanna and Joseph Barbera receive a star at the Hollywood Walk of Fame.
- July 24: Robot Taekwon V premieres.

=== August ===
- August 10–15: The first Ottawa International Animation Festival takes place.
- August 12: Lubomír Beneš and Vladimír Jiránek's Pat & Mat first airs.

=== September ===
- September 11: The first episode of Hanna-Barbera's Jabberjaw airs.
- September 13: The first episode of Noah and Nelly in... SkylArk airs.
- September 27: The first episode of Chorlton and the Wheelies airs.

=== October ===
- October 1: The first episode of Candy Candy airs.
- October 20: The third Asterix film, The Twelve Tasks of Asterix, premieres. It will become a cult classic.

=== November ===
- November 25: Bruno Bozzetto's Mr. Rossi Looks for Happiness premieres, an animated feature starring his character Mr. Rossi.

=== Specific date unknown ===
- Brian Cosgrove and Mark Hall establish Cosgrove Hall Films.

== Films released ==
- January 1:
  - From the Earth to the Moon (Australia)
  - Off on a Comet (Australia)
- March 4 - Mr. Rossi Looks for Happiness (Italy and Germany)
- March 12:
  - Allegro Non Troppo (Italy)
  - The Twelve Tasks of Asterix (France)
- March 20 - Puss 'n Boots Travels Around the World (Japan)
- June 20 - Once Upon a Girl (United States)
- July 1 - The Three Wise Men (Mexico)
- July 24 - Robot Taekwon V (South Korea)
- September 10 - Everybody Rides the Carousel (United States)
- October 23 - Master of the World (Australia)
- November 20:
  - Agaton Sax and the Bykoebing Village Festival (Sweden)
  - Davy Crockett on the Mississippi (United States and Australia)
- November 25 - Mr. Rossi Looks for Happiness (Italy)
- December 8 - The Four Secrets (Argentina)
- December 10 - Rudolph's Shiny New Year (United States and Japan)
- December 13:
  - Cheorin 007 (South Korea)
  - Robot Taekwon V: Space Mission (South Korea)
- Specific date unknown:
  - Brigand Jurko (Czechoslovakia)
  - Colargol in the Wild West (Poland)
  - Da lu de gushì (China)
  - I, Tintin (Belgium and France)
  - Jinse de dayan (China)

== Television series ==
- January 2 - Huckleberry no Bouken debuts on Fuji Television.
- January 4 - 3000 Leagues in Search of Mother debuts on Fuji Television and Anglia Television.
- January 26 - Ivor the Engine debuts on ITV/Associated-Rediffusion and BBC.
- March - Jamie and the Magic Torch debuts on ITV.
- April 1 - Gaiking debuts on Fuji TV.
- April 2 - Machine Hayabusa debuts on TV Asahi.
- April 4 - Gowappa 5 Gōdam debuts on NET.
- April 6 - UFO Warrior Dai Apolon debuts on TBS and Tokyo 12 Channel.
- April 17 - Cho Denji Robo Combattler V debuts on TV Asahi.
- April 27 - Piccolino no Bōken debuts on TV Asahi.
- July 1 - Gloizer X debuts on Tokyo Channel 12.
- July 5 - Blocker Gundan 4 Machine Blaster debuts on Fuji TV.
- August 12 - Pat & Mat debuts on ČST, ČT, STV, ČT :D, and TV JOJ.
- September 4 - Clue Club debuts on CBS.
- September 5 - Magne Robo Gakeen debuts on ANN (ANB).
- September 11:
  - Dynomutt, Dog Wonder, Jabberjaw, The Mumbly Cartoon Show, The Scooby-Doo/Dynomutt Hour, and The Scooby-Doo Show debut on ABC.
  - Tarzan, Lord of the Jungle debuts on CBS.
- September 13 - Noah and Nelly in... SkylArk debuts on BBC1.
- September 18 - Misterjaw debuts on NBC.
- September 26 - Chorlton and the Wheelies debuts on ITV.
- October 1:
  - Candy Candy and Kyoryu Tankentai Born Free debut on TV Asahi.
  - Hoka Hoka Kazoku debuts on Fuji TV.
- October 3:
  - Little Lulu debuts on NET.
  - Paul no Miracle Daisakusen debuts on Fuji TV.
- October 6 - Dokaben debuts on Fuji TV.
- December 24 - Monica's Gang debuts on Rede Globo, Cartoon Network, Starz, and TV Cultura.

== Births ==
=== January ===
- January 1: Sandra Equihua, Mexican animator, painter, sculptor, character designer (¡Mucha Lucha!: The Return of El Maléfico, The Buzz on Maggie, Wow! Wow! Wubbzy!, Guardians of Oz, The Book of Life, DC Super Hero Girls, We the People, Maya and the Three), voice actress and illustrator (co-creator of El Tigre: The Adventures of Manny Rivera).
- January 6: Johnny Yong Bosch, American actor (voice of Vash the Stampede in Trigun, Ichigo Kurosaki in Bleach, Lelouch Lamperouge in Code Geass, Renton Thurston in Eureka Seven, Izaya Orihara in Durarara!!, Artemis in the Viz Media dub of Sailor Moon).
- January 8: Jenny Lewis, American singer-songwriter, musician, and actress (voice of Assistant Director in Bolt, Ruby in It's an Adventure, Charlie Brown, Amy in the American Dad! episode "Merlot Down Dirty Shame").
- January 13: Michael Peña, American actor (voice of Tito Lopez in Turbo, Kai in The Lego Ninjago Movie, Grubber in My Little Pony: The Movie, Momo in Next Gen).
- January 16: Carrie Keranen, American voice actress, production manager, producer and voice director (voice of Mitsuki in Kappa Mikey, Ellen's Mom in Ellen's Acres, Mami Tomoe in Puella Magi Madoka Magica, Mamo in Glitter Force Doki Doki, Alya Césaire in Miraculous: Tales of Ladybug & Cat Noir, Yellow Technique in OK K.O.! Let's Be Heroes, Sailor Galaxia in Sailor Moon).
- January 27: Chris Gauthier, English-born Canadian actor (voice of Rex Guardian 4 in the Storm Hawks episode "The Code"), (d. 2024).
- January 30: Andy Milonakis, American actor (voice of N.E.P.T.R. in Adventure Time, Danny Douglas in Future-Worm!, Jared in the Billy Dilley's Super-Duper Subterranean Summer episode "Jared").
- January 31: Paul Scheer, American actor and comedian (voice of Chip Whistler in Big City Greens, Hopper in Tron: Uprising, Toronto in Adventure Time, Kurt Bilzerian in Big Mouth, Andy Billups in Star Trek: Lower Decks, Gary in the Gravity Falls episode "Soos and the Real Girl", Mysterio in the Ultimate Spider-Man episode "The Moon Knight Before Christmas", Tony Marv in The Problem Solverz episode "Funny Facez").

=== February ===
- February 3:
  - Isla Fisher, Australian actress (voice of Mary Lou Larue in Horton Hears A Who!, Tooth Fairy in Rise of the Guardians, Beans in Rango, Maddie in Back to the Outback, Sarah Hatoff in Dog Man)
  - Tim Heidecker, American comedian, writer, actor, and musician (voice of Basketball in the Aqua Teen Hunger Force episode "Hypno-Germ", Amus Bruse in The Simpsons episode "The Food Wife", Burt Dellalucci in Bob's Burgers, Bruce Starr in the Jeff & Some Aliens episode "Jeff and Some Confidence", Tim, Teddy and Damien Dawson in the Clarence episode "Rock Show", Stan in the Animals episode "Rats", Zip in the Pickle and Peanut episode "90's Adventure Bear And The Coconut Helmut", Doug in the Wild Life episode "Doug the Bear", Darren Young in Fired on Mars, Garth in the Solar Opposites episode "The Mobile AISHA Emitter", Edu-Mart Announcer in the Teenage Euthanasia episode "Sexually Educated", Guest Performer in Carol & the End of the World, Rodney, Humphrey and Baby New Year in Kiff, creator and voice of Tom in Tom Goes to the Mayor).
- February 6: Charlie Day, American actor, writer, and producer (voice of Benny in The Lego Movie franchise, Art in Monsters University, Luigi in The Super Mario Bros. Movie and The Super Mario Galaxy Movie).
- February 16: Janet Varney, American actress and comedian (voice of Korra in The Legend of Korra, Wonder Woman in Injustice, Carol Linnaeus in The Loud House episode "Blinded by Science", Vilya in The Legend of Vox Machina episode "Pass Through Fire", Mera in the Harley Quinn episode "A Very Problematic Valentine's Day Special").
- February 19: Dan Fogelman, American producer and screenwriter (Walt Disney Animation Studios).
- February 23:
  - Lorne Balfe, Scottish composer.
  - Kelly Macdonald, Scottish actress (voice of Merida in Brave and Ralph Breaks the Internet).
- February 25: Rashida Jones, American actress (voice of Cool Girl's Emotions in Inside Out, Donna Lou Who in The Grinch, Alva in Klaus, Marcy Kappel in Spies in Disguise, Hotwire in The Awesomes, Casper, Little Orphan Annie, Molly, and Princess in the Robot Chicken episode "Tell My Mom", Daisy in The Cleveland Show episode "All You Can Eat", Portia in The Simpsons episode "The Changing of the Guardian", Alice in Hexed, Mia Abara and herself in Duncanville), writer (Toy Story 4), producer, and director.
- February 27: Yukari Tamura, Japanese actress (voice of Nanoha Takamachi in Magical Girl Lyrical Nanoha, Tenten in Naruto, Ruru Amour / Cure Amour in Hug! Pretty Cure, Ranpha Franboise in Galaxy Angel, Elizabeth Midford in Black Butler).

=== March ===
- March 7: Jim Miller, American animator, storyboard artist (Ed, Edd n Eddy, WildBrain Studios), writer (My Little Pony: Friendship Is Magic, Johnny Test) and director (WildBrain Studios).
- March 8: Freddie Prinze Jr., American actor, producer and screenwriter (voice of Kanan Jarrus in Star Wars Rebels, the title character in Delgo, Rick in Happily N'ever After, Pisces in Shark Bait, Future Jim and Tim Possible in Kim Possible: A Sitch in Time).
- March 13: Danny Masterson, American actor (voice of Cory in the King of the Hill episode "Megalo Date", Quinn in the Kim Possible episode "And the Mole-Rat Will Be CGI").
- March 15: Verónica Toussaint, Mexican actress and television presenter (Latin American dub voice of Merton in DC League of Super-Pets, Zhen in Kung Fu Panda 4, Dr. Zara in Abominable), (d. 2024).
- March 19: Nicholas Stoller, British-American filmmaker (Warner Animation Group, Captain Underpants: The First Epic Movie).
- March 21: Rachael MacFarlane, American voice actress, singer and sister of Seth MacFarlane (voice of Hayley Smith in American Dad!, Odalia Blight in The Owl House, Olivia in Family Guy, Eris and Mindy in The Grim Adventures of Billy & Mandy, Numbuh 362 in Codename: Kids Next Door, Cordelia in Sofia the First, Nina Crocker/Timezone in the Static Shock episode "Flashback").
- March 22: Reese Witherspoon, American actress and producer (voice of Susan Murphy / Ginormica in Monsters vs. Aliens, Rosita in Sing and Sing 2).
- March 23: Keri Russell, American actress (voice of Wonder Woman in Wonder Woman).
- March 31: Nate Cash, American artist, writer, and director (SpongeBob SquarePants, Adventure Time, Over the Garden Wall).

=== April ===
- April 1:
  - Troy Baker, American actor (voice of Abel Nightroad in Trinity Blood, Gennosuke Kouga in Basilisk, Frank Archer in Fullmetal Alchemist, Greed in Fullmetal Alchemist: Brotherhood, Nagi Springfield in Negima!, Schneizel el Britannia in Code Geass, Van Kleiss in Generator Rex, Captain Grime in Amphibia, Loki and Hawkeye in Ultimate Spider-Man, Kraven the Hunter in Avengers Assemble and Spider-Man, Hawkman in Justice League Action, Lord Decibel in Ben 10).
  - David Oyelowo, English actor (voice of Scar in The Lion Guard, Alexsandr Kallus in Star Wars Rebels).
- April 2:
  - Gilad Kleter, Israeli actor (dub voice of Larry Needlemeyer in The Amazing World of Gumball, Captain America in The Super Hero Squad Show, The Avengers: Earth's Mightiest Heroes, and Avengers Assemble, Martian Manhunter in Justice League and Justice League Unlimited, Squidward Tentacles in SpongeBob SquarePants, Dr. Heinz Doofenshmirtz in Phineas and Ferb, Kowalski in the Madagascar franchise).
  - Aaron Lohr, American actor (voice of Tall Twin in Peter Pan & the Pirates, Miguel in Scooby-Doo and the Ghoul School, singing voice of Max Goof in A Goofy Movie, various voices in Fantastic Max, additional voices in Cartoon All-Stars to the Rescue).
- April 4: Ricky Garduno, American animator and storyboard artist (¡Mucha Lucha!, Coconut Fred's Fruit Salad Island, The Buzz on Maggie, El Tigre: The Adventures of Manny Rivera, Making Fiends, Family Guy), (d. 2011).
- April 5: Sterling K. Brown, American actor (voice of Garry in The Angry Birds Movie 2, Lieutenant Mattias in Frozen II).
- April 7: Eric Wareheim, American comedian, actor, writer, director, and musician (voice of Germ-Master in the Aqua Teen Hunger Force episode "Hypno-Germ", Phil Finnigan in the Bob's Burgers episode "Torpedo", Fois Garth in The Simpsons episode "The Food Wife", creator and voice of the Mayor in Tom Goes to the Mayor).
- April 9: Blayne Weaver, American actor and filmmaker (voice of Peter Pan in Return to Never Land, House of Mouse, and The Lion King 1/2).
- April 13:
  - Glenn Howerton, American actor (voice of Ernie Krinklesac in The Cleveland Show, Fred Jones in Velma).
  - Jonathan Brandis, American actor (voice of Mozenrath in Aladdin), (d. 2003).
- April 16: Lukas Haas, American actor and musician (voice of Casey MacCurdy in The Zeta Project episode "On the Wire", Private in the Justice League episode "Eclipsed").
- April 18:
  - Gavin Creel, American actor (voice of Matthews in Rapunzel's Tangled Adventure), (d. 2024).
  - Melissa Joan Hart, American actress (voice of Becca Chang in The Loud House and The Casagrandes, Hilda and Zelda Spellman in Sabrina: The Animated Series, the Dee Dee Twins in the DC Animated Universe, Saturn Girl in the Superman: The Animated Series episode "New Kids in Town").
- April 20: Joey Lawrence, American actor, musician, and game show host (voice of Oliver in Oliver & Company, Chad in A Goofy Movie, Dirk Brock in The Emperor's New School, Franklin Dudikoff in the Recess episode "The Dude", Dex Finley in The Zeta Project episode "Eye of the Storm").
- April 22: Misty Lee, American voice actress (voice of Freya McCloud in Lego City Adventures, Kabae in Aggretsuko, Big Barda in DC Super Hero Girls, Aunt May in Ultimate Spider-Man, Betty Ross in the Hulk and the Agents of S.M.A.S.H. episode "Banner Day").
- April 23: Gabriel Damon, American former actor (voice of Littlefoot in The Land Before Time, Nemo in Little Nemo: Adventures in Slumberland).
- April 26: Thurop Van Orman, American cartoonist, animator, voice actor (voice of Li'l Gideon in Gravity Falls, various characters in Sanjay and Craig, Tree Witch, Kent and Wishy in Adventure Time, Todd Capybara in Rise of the Teenage Mutant Ninja Turtles, Memory Monster in Battle Kitty), storyboard artist, writer (Cartoon Network Studios, Home: Adventures with Tip & Oh), producer (Adventure Time, Sanjay and Craig, Home: Adventures with Tip & Oh) and director (The Angry Birds Movie 2, creator and voice of the title character in The Marvelous Misadventures of Flapjack).

=== May ===
- May 4: William Reiss, American animator, storyboard artist, and writer (Nickelodeon Animation Studio, Cartoon Network Studios, Disney Television Animation).
- May 11: Abe Audish, American animator (The Simpsons Movie, Spaceballs: The Animated Series), storyboard artist (Shaggy & Scooby-Doo Get a Clue!, Good Vibes, Napoleon Dynamite, Futurama, Sanjay and Craig, Clarence, We Bare Bears), director (Sanjay and Craig, Rise of the Teenage Mutant Ninja Turtles, Tig n' Seek) and producer (Bugs Bunny Builders).
- May 25: J. Michael Tatum, American actor (voice of Scar in Fullmetal Alchemist: Brotherhood, Tenya Iida in My Hero Academia, Erwin Smith in Attack on Titan, Sebastian Michaelis in Black Butler, France in Hetalia: Axis Powers, Fuegoleon in Black Clover, Magma in Dr. Stone, Professor Amaranth and Tobias in Pokémon, Klein Sieben in RWBY).
- May 26: Bryan Konietzko, American animator, storyboard artist (Family Guy, King of the Hill, Mission Hill, Invader Zim), character designer (Family Guy), writer, producer and musician (co-creator of Avatar: The Last Airbender and The Legend of Korra).
- May 28: Liam O'Brien, American voice actor, writer, and director (voice of Gaara in Naruto, Jushiro Ukitake in Bleach, Lloyd in Code Geass, Nephrite in the Viz Media dub of Sailor Moon, General Zod in DC Super Hero Girls, Angel and Nightcrawler in Wolverine and the X-Men, Red Skull in Avengers Assemble, Hulk and the Agents of S.M.A.S.H., and the Phineas and Ferb episode "Phineas and Ferb: Mission Marvel", Doctor Strange in Avengers Assemble, Ultimate Spider-Man, and Spider-Man).
- Specific date unknown: Amy Winfrey, American animator (South Park, Tuca & Bertie), screenwriter, songwriter, director (BoJack Horseman, Greatest Party Story Ever, Tuca & Bertie) and voice actress (creator and voice of Charlotte and Marion in Making Fiends).

=== June ===
- June 5: Marc Worden, Canadian actor (voice of Yasutora Sado in Bleach, Iron Man in the Marvel Animated Features, Slam in The Zeta Project, Killer Moth in the Teen Titans episode "Can I Keep Him?", Warhawk and Future Parasite in the Justice League Unlimited episode "Epilogue").
- June 6:
  - Emilie-Claire Barlow, Canadian singer and actress (voice of Sailor Mars and Sailor Venus in the original English dub of Sailor Moon, Courtney in the Total Drama franchise, Mrs. Ridgemount in Stoked, Bunny in Almost Naked Animals, Theresa Falcone in Fugget About It, Alice Gehabich in Bakugan Battle Brawlers).
  - Yasumichi Kushida, Japanese voice actor (voice of Vice Principal in Haikyu!!, Shinobi in Naruto, dub voice of Hulk in The Avengers: Earth's Mightiest Heroes, Avengers Assemble, Ultimate Spider-Man, and Hulk and the Agents of S.M.A.S.H.), (d. 2023).
- June 11: Salli Saffioti, American actress (voice of Ingrid Hunnigan in the Resident Evil franchise, Clawdeen Wolf, Cleo de Nile and Mrs. O'Shriek in the Monster High franchise, The Triad in High Guardian Spice, Jacinda in the Amphibia episode "Toad to Redemption", Penelope Pussycat in the Bugs Bunny Builders episode "Catwalk").
- June 21: Dan Scanlon, American animator, storyboard artist, director and screenwriter (Pixar).
- June 27:
  - Christianna Lang Daley, American animator (The Simpsons).
  - Wagner Moura, Brazilian actor, voice actor and filmmaker (voice of Death in Puss in Boots: The Last Wish).
- June 28: Jason J. Lewis, American actor (voice of Superman and various other characters in Justice League Action, Ganthet in Green Lantern: Beware My Power).
- June 29: Bret McKenzie, New Zealand comedian, actor, musician and producer (voice of Alien in The Drinky Crow Show, Kurt Hardwick in The Simpsons episode "Elementary School Musical"; composed songs for the episodes "Friend with Benefit" and "Panic on the Streets of Springfield").

=== July ===
- July 4: Kousuke Takeuchi, Japanese voice actor (voice of Hikaru Amane in The Prince of Tennis, Shuun Kakei and Harao Kiminari in Eyeshield 21, Tesshin in Ginga Densetsu Weed, Dragon Ryu in Duel Masters Victory, Mitsuo Mishima in Between the Sky and Sea), (d. 2022).
- July 9: Fred Savage, American actor and director (voice of the title character in Oswald, Noah Nixon in Generator Rex, Goober and Richie Osborne in BoJack Horseman, Prince Thomas in The Legend of Prince Valiant episode "Peace on Earth", Hank Hall / Hawk in the Justice League Unlimited episode "Hawk and Dove", Steve and Westworld Investor in the Robot Chicken episode "Scoot to the Gute", Parker in the Bob's Burgers episode "Boywatch", Kyle H. and himself in the Family Guy episodes "Fox-y Lady" and "Customer of the Week", additional voices in the Captain Planet and the Planeteers episode "The Ark").
- July 15: Gabriel Iglesias, American comedian and actor (voice of Jimmy in The Nut Job and The Nut Job 2: Nutty by Nature, Pepe Rodriguez in The Book of Life, Jokey Smurf in Smurfs: The Lost Village, Speedy Gonzales in Space Jam: A New Legacy, Guaca in The Emperor's New School).
- July 19: Benedict Cumberbatch, English actor (voice of Severus Snape and Quilloughby in The Simpsons, Classified in Penguins of Madagascar, the title character in The Grinch, Daddy in The Tiger Who Came to Tea, Doctor Strange in What If...?).
- July 27: Eddie Guzelian, American television writer (Disney Television Animation, Big Guy and Rusty the Boy Robot, Jackie Chan Adventures, Warner Bros. Animation, The Secret Saturdays, The Penguins of Madagascar, Peter Rabbit, Monsters vs. Aliens, LoliRock, Kuu Kuu Harajuku) and producer (American Dragon: Jake Long).
- July 31: Mela Lee, American actress (voice of Rin Tohsaka in Fate/stay night, Rena Ryuugu and Toshiki Inukai in When They Cry, Tikki in Miraculous: Tales of Ladybug & Cat Noir, Kikimora in The Owl House, Principal Rivers in The Loud House, Princess Zanda in Avengers Assemble).

=== August ===
- August 1: Don Hertzfeldt, American animator, writer, and independent filmmaker (It's Such a Beautiful Day, World of Tomorrow, Rejected).
- August 6: Soleil Moon Frye, American actress (voice of Punky Brewster in It's Punky Brewster, Amanda Duff in Tiny Toon Adventures, Zoey in The Proud Family franchise, Jade in Bratz).
- August 8: JC Chasez, American musician, actor, and member of NSYNC (voiced himself in The Simpsons episode "New Kids on the Blecch" and the What's New, Scooby-Doo? episode "A Scooby-Doo Valentine").
- August 11: Will Friedle, American actor (voice of Terry McGinnis / Batman in the DC Animated Universe, Ron Stoppable in Kim Possible, Doyle in The Secret Saturdays, Star-Lord in Guardians of the Galaxy, Lion-O in ThunderCats, Blue Beetle in Batman: The Brave and the Bold, Bumblebee in the Transformers franchise, Deadpool in the Ultimate Spider-Man episode "Ultimate Deadpool", Kyle Rayner in the Justice League Unlimited episode "The Return").
- August 22: Chris Wylde, American actor (voice of Bread Baron in Future-Worm!, Gary and Viper in Pickle and Peanut, Angwin in Amphibia, Ribby in The Cuphead Show!).
- August 27: Sarah Chalke, Canadian actress and model (voice of Marie Antoinette in Clone High, Magee in the Prep & Landing franchise, Beth Smith in Rick and Morty, Mrs. Murawski in Milo Murphy's Law, Gina Jabowski in Paradise PD, Stella in Dogs in Space, the Professor in Hailey's On It!, David's Mom in the Special Agent Oso episode "The Manny with the Golden Bear").
- August 28: Angus Oblong, American writer and illustrator (creator of The Oblongs).
- August 29: Christopher J. Prouty, American television writer (The Fairly OddParents) and script coordinator (Nickelodeon Animation Studio).

=== September ===
- September 4: Jun Fukushima, Japanese voice actor and narrator (voice of Shoukichi Naruko in Yowamushi Pedal, Yoshihisa Manabe in Kotoura-san, Kazuma Sato in KonoSuba, Formaggio in JoJo's Bizarre Adventure: Golden Wind).
- September 6: Robin Atkin Downes, English actor (voice of Mumm-Ra in ThunderCats, Baron Strucker, Abomination, Baron Zemo, and Mister Fantastic in various series for Marvel Animation, Man-Bat and Deathstroke in Beware the Batman, Hex in Ben 10, Weather Wizard and Firefly in Batman: The Brave and the Bold, Falcon Graves in DuckTales, Adegast in The Owl House episode "Witches Before Wizards", Gil Broome / Steam Lantern in the Green Lantern: The Animated Series episode "Steam Lantern").
- September 20:
  - Enuka Okuma, Canadian actress (voice of Rhodonite in Steven Universe, Lady Une in the Gundam franchise).
  - Jon Bernthal, American actor (voice of Rat-a-Pult in SuperMansion, Trigon in Justice League vs. Teen Titans).

=== October ===
- October 4: Alicia Silverstone, American actress (voice of Sharon Spitz in Braceface, Queen Marlena in Masters of the Universe: Revelation).
- October 6: Brett Gelman, American actor and comedian (voice of Magic Myc in Inside Job, Jeff in TripTank and Jeff & Some Aliens, Marcellus in Arlo the Alligator Boy and I Heart Arlo, Rocket Horse in the Aqua Teen Hunger Force episode "Robot Horse & Jet Chicken", Ring Master in the Adventure Time episode "Sad Face").
- October 9: Nick Swardson, American actor, stand-up comedian, screenwriter, and producer (voice of Blake in Bolt, Kelsey in Hotel Transylvania 2, Remy in Hell and Back, Bunny in Leo).
- October 13: Illya Owens, American film editor (The Grim Adventures of Billy & Mandy, Chowder, Disney Television Animation, Randy Cunningham: 9th Grade Ninja, Hair Love, Vivo).
- October 19: Omar Gooding, American actor (voice of Jared Tate in Batman Beyond, Wade in the Static Shock episode "Shock to the System").
- October 20: Dan Fogler, American actor and comedian (voice of Gribble in Mars Needs Moms, Chairman and Yummo Wickersham in Horton Hears a Who!, Zheng in Kung Fu Panda, Governor Bradford in Free Birds).
- October 22: Greg Colton, American animator (Dilbert), storyboard artist (3-South, Invader Zim, The Powerpuff Girls, ¡Mucha Lucha!) and director (Family Guy).
- October 23: Ryan Reynolds, Canadian-American actor (voice of Ty Cheese in Zeroman, Guy in The Croods franchise, the title character in Turbo, Pikachu in Detective Pikachu, Overweight Guy in the Family Guy episode "Jesus, Mary and Joseph!", himself in the Family Guy episodes "Stewie Goes for a Drive" and "Follow the Money", and the Corner Gas Animated episode "Ruby Re-Burn").
- October 24: Arturo Del Puerto, American actor (voice of Panchito Pistoles in DuckTales, Rico in the Elena of Avalor episode "Crash Course").
- October 26: Brad Neely, American comic book artist, television writer, and producer (South Park, China, IL, Brad Neely's Harg Nallin' Sclopio Peepio).
- October 31: Bianca DeGroat, American actress (portrayed herself in the For Real segments of Cyberchase).

=== November ===
- November 4: Jonathan Kimmel, American actor, television writer, production assistant (South Park), director, producer (Drawn Together, Crank Yankers), composer and brother of Jimmy Kimmel (voice of Sonny and Jon the Businessman in Crank Yankers, The King in Drawn Together, Scab in The Wild, Dr. Lawrence 'Brad' Perkins and Molemen in Saul of the Mole Men, Boneologist in the Minoriteam episode "Tribe & Prejudice").
- November 9: Federica De Bortoli, Italian actress (dub voice of Lexi Bunny in Loonatics Unleashed, Saturn Girl in Legion of Super Heroes, Candy in Dave the Barbarian, Rapunzel in Rapunzel's Tangled Adventure).
- November 12: Tevin Campbell, American singer and songwriter (voice of Powerline in A Goofy Movie).
- November 17: Chris Demetral, American former actor (voice of Mato in The Wild Thornberrys episode "Pack of Thornberrys", Corey Cavalieri in the Batman Beyond episode "Sentries of the Last Cosmos", Bret in The Zeta Project episode "Quality Time").
- November 19: Blair Kitchen, Canadian animator (Nelvana, Titan A.E., Anne of Green Gables: The Animated Series, The Abrafaxe – Under The Black Flag, Osmosis Jones, The Ripping Friends, Kronk's New Groove, Curious George, Busytown Mysteries, Cuppa Coffee Studios, Looney Tunes Cartoons) and storyboard artist (Hoze Houndz, Nelvana, Johnny Test, The Book of Life, Trollhunters: Tales of Arcadia, Welcome to the Wayne, Ferdinand, Next Gen, Maya and the Three), (d. 2020).
- November 27: Jaleel White, American actor, writer and producer (voice of the title character in Adventures of Sonic the Hedgehog, Sonic the Hedgehog, and Sonic Underground, Bladebeak in Quest for Camelot, young Martin Luther King Jr. in Our Friend, Martin, Gene the Genie in DuckTales, Gadgetmobile in Inspector Gadget's Last Case, K-999 in The Problem Solverz, Percy in SuperF*ckers, Daryl and Cool Shade in the Regular Show episode "TGI Tuesday", Boy Who Cried Wolf in the Happily Ever After: Fairy Tales for Every Child episode "Aesop's Fables: A Whodunit Musical", Steve Urkel and Urkel-Bot in the Scooby-Doo and Guess Who? episode "When Urkel-Bots Go Bad!", Miner in the Teen Titans Go! episode "The Night Begins to Shine - Chapter One: Mission to Find the Lost Stems").
- November 28: Ryan Kwanten, Australian actor and producer (voice of Kludd in Legend of the Guardians: The Owls of Ga'Hoole, Brewster the Beast Trapper in Jake and the Never Land Pirates and Blinky Bill in Blinky Bill the Movie).
- November 29:
  - Chadwick Boseman, American actor (voice of T'Challa/Black Panther in What If...?), (d. 2020).
  - Anna Faris, American actress (voice of Sam Sparks in Cloudy with a Chance of Meatballs and Cloudy with a Chance of Meatballs 2, Jeanette in the Alvin and the Chipmunks franchise, Jailbreak in The Emoji Movie, Chartreuse and Lil' Bunny in HouseBroken, Ashley the Female Hacker in The Simpsons episode "Lisa the Boy Scout").

=== December ===
- December 2: Murray Miller, American television producer, writer, and voice actor (Clone High, King of the Hill, American Dad!).
- December 4: Jonathan Forbes, Irish actor (voice of Connor in Thomas & Friends).
- December 5: Amy Acker, American actress (voice of Huntress in Justice League Unlimited, Nova in Scooby-Doo! Mystery Incorporated, Lois Lane in Superman: Red Son).
- December 8: Dominic Monaghan, British-Irish actor (voice of Wrot in The Lord of the Rings: The War of the Rohirrim, Fig in the Sofia the First episode "The Crown of Blossoms", Archibald Desnay in The Legend of Vox Machina, Hamylton in Angry Birds Mystery Island).
- December 16: Erik Sommers, American television producer and screenwriter (3-South, Crank Yankers, Drawn Together, American Dad!, The Lego Batman Movie).
- December 17: Dan Hageman, American screenwriter and producer (Ninjago, Hotel Transylvania, The Lego Movie, Trollhunters: Tales of Arcadia, The Lego Ninjago Movie, The Croods: A New Age, Trollhunters: Rise of the Titans, Star Trek: Prodigy).
- December 26:
  - Brad Swaile, Canadian voice actor (voice of Light Yagami in Death Note, Rock in Black Lagoon, Mousse in Ranma ½, teen Gohan in the Ocean dub of Dragon Ball Z, various characters in the Gundam franchise, Nightcrawler in X-Men: Evolution, Dooley in the Krypto the Superdog episode "Furry Fish").
  - Joe Manganiello, American actor (voice of Hefty Smurf in Smurfs: The Lost Village, Ax Tagrin in Star Wars Resistance, Viper Fang in Big City Greens, Coldsnap in the Bubble Guppies episode "Winter Sports Competition", Courthard in the Love, Death & Robots episode "In Vaulted Halls Entombed").
- December 29: Danny McBride, American actor, comedian, producer and writer (voice of Fred McDade in Despicable Me, Voneeta Teets in Good Vibes, Wolf Boss in Kung Fu Panda 2, Jimmy in Chozen, Orpheus in Hell and Back, Honey Mustard in Sausage Party, Bomb in The Angry Birds Movie and The Angry Birds Movie 2, Rick Mitchell in The Mitchells vs. the Machines, Gregory in the Animals episode "Turkeys").

=== Specific date unknown ===
- Qui Nguyen, American playwright and screenwriter (Peg + Cat, Raya and the Last Dragon, Strange World).
- Dan Cantrell, American composer (The Marvelous Misadventures of Flapjack).
- Todd Halford, American modeler and production assistant (Mainframe Entertainment), (d. 2001).

== Deaths ==
=== February ===
- February 1: Hans Richter, German film producer of animated films, painter, graphic artist, and art historian (Pioneer of abstract animation, directed the animated short films Rhythmus 21, and Ghosts Before Breakfast), dies at age 87.
- February 3: Ramsay Hill, British actor (voice of Labrador Retriever and TV Announcer in One Hundred and One Dalmatians), dies at age 86.
- February 6: Vince Guaraldi, American jazz composer (Peanuts), dies at age 47.
- February 13: John Lounsbery, American animator (Walt Disney Company), dies at age 64.

=== March ===
- March 3: Ray Gilbert, American lyricist (Song of the South, The Three Caballeros), dies at age 63.
- March 8: Romer Zane Grey, American animator (Romer Grey Studio) and comics writer, dies at age 66.
- March 15: Larry Thor, Canadian newscaster, announcer, and actor (voice of Tock the Watchdog in The Phantom Tollbooth), dies at age 59.

=== June ===
- June 19: Mike Arens, American animator and comics artist (Walt Disney Company, Hanna-Barbera), dies at age 60.

=== August ===
- August 8: Winston Hibler, American screenwriter and film producer (Walt Disney Company), dies at age 65.
- August 19: Alastair Sim, Scottish actor (voice of Ebenezer Scrooge in A Christmas Carol), dies at age 75.

=== October ===
- October 19: Donald W. Graham, Canadian-American animator, artist and art instructor (Walt Disney Company), dies at age 73.
- October 23: Francisco Macián, Spanish animator and film director and producer (El mago de los sueños), dies at age 46.

=== November ===
- November 7: Roy Williams, American animator storyman (Walt Disney Animation Studios) and presenter, dies at age 69.

=== December ===
- December 5: Tack Knight, American animator and comics artist (Animated Film Corporation, Walt Disney Company, Fleischer Brothers, The Adventures of Horace Cope), dies at age 81.
- December 16: Ashton B. Collins Sr., American inventor and marketer (creator of the character Reddy Kilowatt, producer on the animated film Reddy Made Magic, produced and released by Walter Lantz Productions), dies at age 91.
- December 20: Ned Washington, American lyricist (Walt Disney Animation Studios), dies at age 75.
- December 21: Rod Scribner, American animator (Warner Bros. Cartoons, Peanuts specials) and producer (Playhouse Pictures), dies at age 66.
- December 25: Frankie Darro, American actor (voice of Lampwick in Pinocchio), dies at age 59.
- December 27: André Daix, French animator and comics artist (Professeur Nimbus), dies at age 75.

== See also ==
- 1976 in anime
