= 1976 in Japanese television =

Events in 1976 in Japanese television.

== Debuts ==
| Show | Station | Premiere Date | Genre | Original Run |
|---|---|---|---|---|
| 3000 Leagues in Search of Mother | Fuji TV | January 4 | anime | January 4, 1976 – December 26, 1976 |
| Battle Hawk | Tokyo Channel 12 | October 4 | tokusatsu | October 4, 1976 – March 28, 1977 |
| Blocker Gundan 4 Machine Blaster | Fuji TV | July 5 | anime | July 5, 1976 – March 28, 1977 |
| Candy Candy | NET | October 1 | anime | October 1, 1976 - February 7, 1979 |
| Chōdenji Robo Combattler V | NET | October 7 | anime | October 7, 1976 - March 31, 1977 |
| Choujin Bibyun | NET | July 6 | tokusatsu | July 6, 1976 – March 29, 1977 |
| Dino Mech Gaiking | Fuji TV | April 1 | anime | April 1, 1976 – January 27, 1977 |
| Dokaben | Fuji TV | October 6 | anime | October 6, 1976 – December 26, 1979 |
| Enban Sensō Bankid | Nippon TV | October 3 | tokusatsu | October 3, 1976 – March 23, 1977 |
| Gowappa 5 Gōdam | NET | April 4 | anime | April 4, 1976 – December 29, 1976 |
| Groizer X | Tokyo Channel 12 | July 1 | anime | July 1, 1976 – March 31, 1977 |
| Hoka Hoka Kazoku | Fuji TV | October 1 | anime | October 1, 1976 – March 31, 1982 |
| Migoro! Tabegoro! Waraigoro!! | NET | October | variety | October 1976 – March 1978 |
| Ninja Captor | Tokyo Channel 12 | April 7 | tokusatsu | April 7, 1976 – January 26, 1977 |
| Piccolino no Bōken | NET | April 27 | anime | April 27, 1976 – May 31, 1977 |
| Pro-Wres no Hoshi Aztecaser | NET | October 7 | tokusatsu | October 7, 1976 – March 31, 1977 |
| Space Ironman Kyodain | MBS | April 2 | tokusatsu | April 2, 1976 - March 11, 1977 |
| The Kagestar | NET | April 5 | tokusatsu | April 5, 1976 - November 29, 1976 |

== Ongoing ==
- Music Fair, music (1964–present)
- Mito Kōmon, jidaigeki (1969–2011)
- Sazae-san, anime (1969–present)
- Ōedo Sōsamō, jidaigeki (1970–1984)
- Ōoka Echizen, jidaigeki (1970–1999)
- Star Tanjō!, talent (1971–1983)
- Himitsu Sentai Goranger, tokusatsu (1975–1977)
- Ganbare!! Robocon, tokusatsu (1974–1977)
- FNS Music Festival, music (1974–present)
- Ikkyū-san, anime (1975–1982)
- Panel Quiz Attack 25, game show (1975–present)

== Endings ==
| Show | Station | Ending Date | Genre | Original Run |
|---|---|---|---|---|
| Adventures of Pepero the Andes Boy | NET | March 29 | anime | October 6, 1975 – March 29, 1976 |
| Akumaizer 3 | NET | June 29 | tokusatsu | October 7, 1975 – June 29, 1976 |
| Arabian Nights: Sinbad's Adventures | Fuji TV | September 29 | anime | October 1, 1975 – September 29, 1976 |
| Akumaizer 3 | NET | March 26 | anime | April 4, 1975 – March 26, 1976 |
| First Human Giatrus | TBS | March 27 | anime | October 5, 1974 – March 27, 1976 |
| Getter Robo G | Fuji TV | March 25 | anime | May 15, 1975 – March 25, 1976 |
| Laura, the Prairie Girl | TBS | March 30 | anime | October 7, 1975 – March 30, 1976 |
| Steel Jeeg | NET | August 29 | anime | October 5, 1975 – August 29, 1976 |
| The Adventures of Maya the Honey Bee | NET | April 20 | anime | April 1, 1975 – April 20, 1976 |
| The Kagestar | NET | November 29 | tokusatsu | April 5, 1976 - November 29, 1976 |
| Time Bokan | Fuji TV | December 25 | anime | October 4, 1975 – December 25, 1976 |
| UFO Robot Grendizer | Fuji TV | March 25 | anime | May 15, 1975 – March 25, 1976 |
| Wanpaku Omukashi Kum Kum | TBS | March 26 | anime | October 3, 1975 - March 26, 1976 |

== See also ==
- 1976 in anime
- 1976 in Japan
- List of Japanese films of 1976
