= 1976 in Japan =

- Decades: 1950s; 1960s; 1970s; 1980s; 1990s
- See also: Other events of 1976; History of Japan • Timeline • Years

Events in the year 1976 in Japan. It corresponds to Shōwa 51 (昭和51年) in the Japanese calendar.

== Incumbents ==
- Emperor: Hirohito
- Prime minister: Takeo Miki (Liberal Democratic) until December 24, Takeo Fukuda (Liberal Democratic)
- Chief Cabinet Secretary: Ichitaro Ide until December 24, Sunao Sonoda
- Chief Justice of the Supreme Court: Tomokazu Murakami until May 24, Ekizo Fujibayashi from May 25
- President of the House of Representatives: Shigesaburō Maeo until December 9, Shigeru Hori from December 24
- President of the House of Councillors: Kenzō Kōno
- Diet sessions: 77th (regular session opened on December 27, 1975, to May 24), 78th (extraordinary, September 16 to November 4), 79th (extraordinary, December 24 to December 28), 80th (regular, December 30 to June 9, 1977)

=== Governors ===
- Aichi Prefecture: Yoshiaki Nakaya
- Akita Prefecture: Yūjirō Obata
- Aomori Prefecture: Shunkichi Takeuchi
- Chiba Prefecture: Kiichi Kawakami
- Ehime Prefecture: Haruki Shiraishi
- Fukui Prefecture: Heidayū Nakagawa
- Fukuoka Prefecture: Hikaru Kamei
- Fukushima Prefecture: Morie Kimura (until 11 August); Isao Matsudaira (starting 16 September)
- Gifu Prefecture: Saburō Hirano (until 14 December); vacant thereafter (starting 14 December)
- Gunma Prefecture: Konroku Kanda (until 1 August); Ichiro Shimizu (starting 2 August)
- Hiroshima Prefecture: Hiroshi Miyazawa
- Hokkaido: Naohiro Dōgakinai
- Hyogo Prefecture: Tokitada Sakai
- Ibaraki Prefecture: Fujio Takeuchi
- Ishikawa Prefecture: Yōichi Nakanishi
- Iwate Prefecture: Tadashi Chida
- Kagawa Prefecture: Tadao Maekawa
- Kagoshima Prefecture: Saburō Kanemaru
- Kanagawa Prefecture: Kazuji Nagasu
- Kochi Prefecture: Chikara Nakauchi
- Kumamoto Prefecture: Issei Sawada
- Kyoto Prefecture: Torazō Ninagawa
- Mie Prefecture: Ryōzō Tagawa
- Miyagi Prefecture: Sōichirō Yamamoto
- Miyazaki Prefecture: Hiroshi Kuroki
- Nagano Prefecture: Gon'ichirō Nishizawa
- Nagasaki Prefecture: Kan'ichi Kubo
- Nara Prefecture: Ryozo Okuda
- Niigata Prefecture: Takeo Kimi
- Oita Prefecture: Masaru Taki
- Okayama Prefecture: Shiro Nagano
- Okinawa Prefecture: Chōbyō Yara (until 24 June); Koichi Taira (starting 25 June)
- Osaka Prefecture: Ryōichi Kuroda
- Saga Prefecture: Sunao Ikeda
- Saitama Prefecture: Yawara Hata
- Shiga Prefecture: Masayoshi Takemura
- Shiname Prefecture: Seiji Tsunematsu
- Shizuoka Prefecture: Keizaburō Yamamoto
- Tochigi Prefecture: Yuzuru Funada
- Tokushima Prefecture: Yasunobu Takeichi
- Tokyo: Ryōkichi Minobe
- Tottori Prefecture: Kōzō Hirabayashi
- Toyama Prefecture: Kokichi Nakada
- Wakayama Prefecture: Shirō Kariya
- Yamagata Prefecture: Seiichirō Itagaki
- Yamaguchi Prefecture: Masayuki Hashimoto (until 30 June); Toru Hirai (starting 22 August)
- Yamanashi Prefecture: Kunio Tanabe

== Events ==
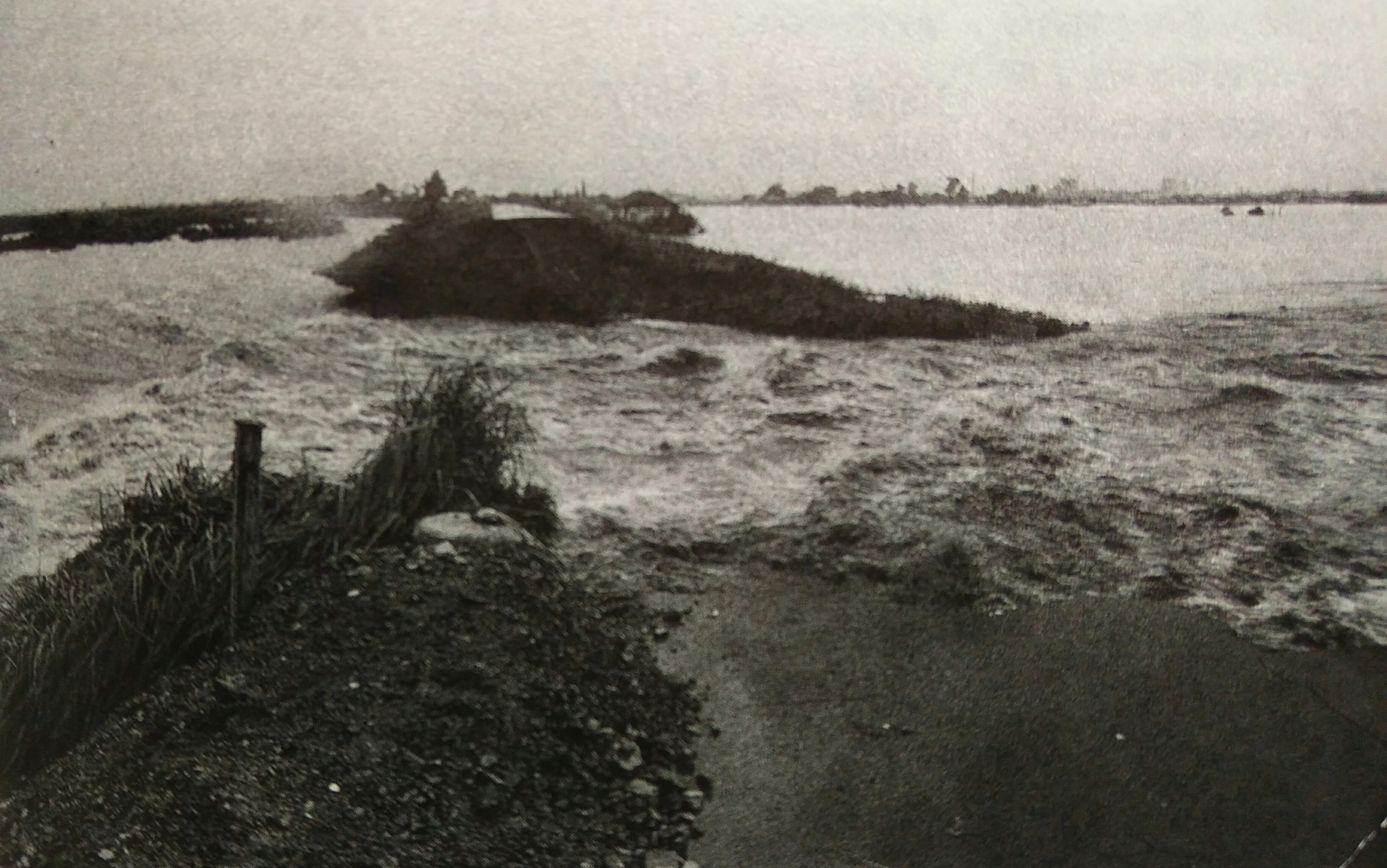
A levee collapse, following to massibie flood by Typhoon Fran, near Nagara River, Gifu Prefecture, on 12 September

- March 2 – A time bomb goes off in the lobby of the Hokkaido Government Main Building in Sapporo, killing 2 and injuring 95.
- March 23 – Yoshio Kodama Residence Cessna Suicide Attack Incident (児玉誉士夫邸セスナ機特攻事件)
- May 15 – According to Japan National Police Agency official confirmed report, a riot by motorbike gang group (Bōsōzoku) attack to police officer in Chuō-ku, Kobe, the resulting to official, killed one journalist, twenty policemen were injured.
- June 26 – Muhammad Ali vs. Antonio Inoki was a controversial spectacle fight, held in Tokyo, between the boxing heavyweight champion, Ali, and Japanese professional wrestling champion, Inoki.
- September 6 – Soviet Air Force pilot Lt. Viktor Belenko lands a MiG-25 jet fighter at Hakodate, Hokkaido, requests political asylum in the United States.
- September 12 – Typhoon Fran, according to Fire and Management Disaster Agency of Japan confirmed report, 171 persons were killed and 537 injured.
- October 29 – A massive fire in Sakata, Yamagata Prefecture, according to Fire and Management Disaster Agency confirmed report, one person was killed, 1,003 were injured, and 1,774 houses and buildings with 22.5 hectare (55.26 acre) were lost.
- December 5 – General election of 1976 - The Liberal Democratic Party win 249 out of 511 seats but lose 22 seats, majority control over the House of Representatives owing to the Lockheed scandal.
- December 21 – Chaos broke out across Japan following the sale of the Year-end Jumbo lottery. Two people died, and at least 30 people were injured.
- December 24 – Prime Minister Takeo Miki resigns following poor results in the 1976 General election and is succeeded by Takeo Fukuda.
- Full date unknown:
  - Helios Techno Holding Co., Ltd. is established.

== Births ==
- January 4 – Shiro Amano, manga artist/writer
- January 5 – Shintarō Asanuma, voice actor
- January 12 – Miki Nakatani, actress
- January 28 – Emiko Kado, professional wrestler (d. 1999)
- February 14 – Juju, jazz singer
- February 16 – Kyo, rock musician
- February 27 – Yukari Tamura, voice actress and songwriter
- March 22 – Asako Toki, singer and songwriter
- March 30 – Ayako Kawasumi, voice actress
- April 2 – Daisuke Namikawa, voice actor
- April 10
  - Yoshino Kimura, actress
  - Norihiro Akahoshi, former professional baseball player
- April 17 – Taishi Mori, manga artist
- May 4 – Anza, singer and actress
- June 1 – Kōhei Murakami, actor
- June 11 – Gran Naniwa, professional wrestler
- June 29 – Haruka Igawa, actress
- July 4 – Daijiro Kato, motorcycle racer
- August 24 – Shinji Udaka, baseball player
- August 29 – Mieko Kawakami, singer and writer
- September 20 – Yui Horie, voice actress
- October 19 – Ryuji Imada, golfer
- November 19 – Jun Shibata, singer and songwriter
- December 18 – Koyuki, actress

== Deaths ==
- January 2 – Kazuo Dan, novelist and poet (b. 1912)
- January 19 – Hidetsugu Yagi, electrical engineer (b. 1886)
- January 27 – Kaneko Daiei, Buddhist philosopher (b. 1881)
- March 23 – Mitsuyasu Maeno, actor (suicide) (b. 1947)
- May 30 – Mitsuo Fuchida, aviator, naval officer and Christian evangelist (b. 1902)
- June 7 – Shigetarō Shimada, Imperial Japanese Navy admiral during World War II (b. 1883)

== See also ==
- 1976 in Japanese television
- List of Japanese films of 1976
- 1976 in Japanese music
