= Franco Godi =

Italian composer

- Born: June 10, 1940 (age 85); Milan
- Occupations: composer record producer

Franco Godi (born 10 June 1940) is an Italian composer, conductor, arranger and record producer.

Born in Milan, Godi grew up in Prato, where he started his musical activity as a member of a band. After working in a local radio station, in 1962 he composed his first jingle for the Bertolli oil, and from then he became the most active composer in the field of commercials and Caroselli in Italy, as to be called "Mr. Jingle".

Godi was also active as a film score composer, particularly in the field of animation, where he had a long collaboration with Bruno Bozzetto, and also composed theme songs for a large number of television programs and series. He is the founder of the record label Best Sound, which produced some of the early hip hop Italian groups, including Articolo 31 and Gemelli Diversi.

== Discography ==
Year	Title	Label	Notes
1968	VIP - Mio Fratello Superuomo Soundtrack	CAM	
1972	Pop-Paraphrenia.....	Fonovideo	Collaboration with Rocchi & Chiarosi
1977	Herr Rossi Sucht Das Glück	Satellit & EMI Electrola	
1977	Herr Rossi Sucht Das Glück Folge 2	Satellit & EMI Electrola	
1978	Rossi, Wenn Du Wärest - Folge 3	Satellit & EMI Electrola	
1978	Rossi, Wenn Du Wärest - Folge 4	Satellit & EMI Electrola	
1978	Drama Test	Music Scene	Collaboration with O. Rocchi & Chiarosi
1978	Le Canzoni De Il Signor Rossi	RCA Original Cast	
1983	Mr. Godi / Mr. Jingle (The Advertising Music In Italy)	Best Sound	
1990	Music For Images And Messages	Best Sound	Compilation
1999	Signor Rossi	Crippled Dick Hot Wax!	Compilation; recorded 1970–1977
2004	La Linea - La Musica (Original Soundtrack)	Crippled Dick Hot Wax!	Recorded 1979–1986
????	Sound - Wave	Cinemusic	

== Filmography ==
Year	Film	Director	Notes
1967	Life In A Tin	Bruno Bozzetto	Short Film
1968	The SuperVips	Bruno Bozzetto	
1970	Il signor Rossi al Camping	Bruno Bozzetto	Short Film
1972	Lineman season 1	Osvaldo Cavandoli	TV show,
1974	Self Service	Bruno Bozzetto	Short Film
1974	Mr. Rossi in Venise	Bruno Bozzetto	Short Film
1974	Paolo il freddo	Ciccio Ingrassia	
1975	The Exorcist: Italian Style	Ciccio Ingrassia	
1976	Il signor Rossi cerca la felicità	Bruno Bozzetto	
1976	Allegro non troppo	Bruno Bozzetto	'Ballet Themes'
1976	Mr Rossi's Vacation	Bruno Bozzetto	
1977	Mr. Rossi's Dreams	Bruno Bozzetto	
1977	Supergulp, i fumetti in TV	Sandro Lodolo	Season 1
1978	The Last Savage	Alfredo Castiglioni & Angelo Castiglioni	
1979	Lineman season 2	Osvaldo Cavandoli	TV show
1981	Supergulp, i fumetti in TV	Sandro Lodolo	Season 3
1982	Shocking Africa	Alfredo Castiglioni & Angelo Castiglioni	Short Film
1982	Tennis Club	Bruno Bozzetto	Short Film
1984	Moa Moa	Bruno Bozzetto	Short Film
1986	Lineman season 3	Osvaldo Cavandoli	TV show
1988	Don Tonino Season 1	Fosco Gasperi	TV series
1990	Don Tonino Season 2	Fosco Gasperi	TV series
2001	Senza filtro	Mimmo Raimondi	Actor, 'JD'
2006	53 días de invierno	Judith Colell	Writer of 'Misty Lovers'
