= Giuseppe Rinaldi =

Italian actor (1919–2007)

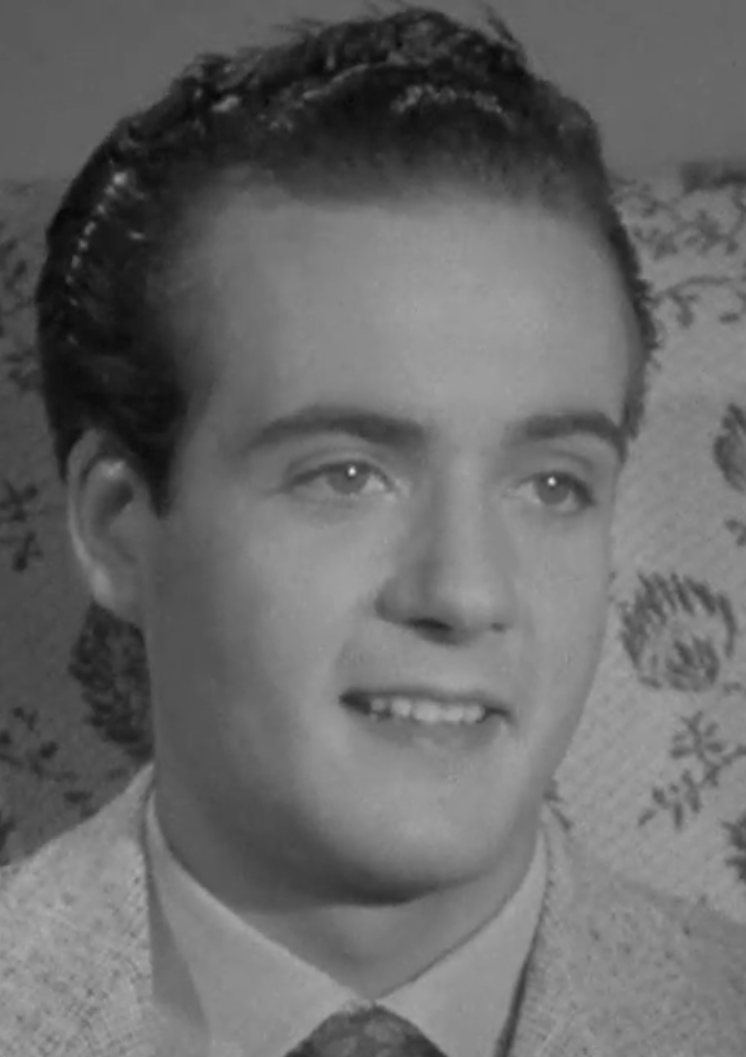
- Rinaldi in The Man on the Street (1941)
- Born: 14 September 1919; Rome, Italy
- Died: 15 December 2007 (aged 88); Rome, Italy
- Other names: Peppino Rinaldi
- Occupations: Actor; voice actor; dubbing director
- Years active: 1939–1997
- Spouse(s): Marina Dolfin (divorced); Maria Pia Casilio
- Children: Massimo; Antonella; Francesca

Giuseppe Rinaldi (14 September 1919 – 15 December 2007) was an Italian actor and voice actor.

== Biography ==
Born in Rome, Rinaldi appeared in more than 20 films between 1939 and 1982. During his time, he was considered to be one of the greatest dubbers in Italy. He provided the Italian voices of Marlon Brando, Jack Lemmon, Rock Hudson, Paul Newman, Van Johnson and James Dean. Other actors dubbed by him included Peter Sellers, Frank Sinatra, Glenn Ford, David Tomlinson, Richard Burton, George Peppard, Burt Lancaster, Charles Bronson, Kirk Douglas, Gregory Peck, Roger Moore, Jeffrey Hunter, Max von Sydow, and Christopher Plummer. He even dubbed many Italian actors in post-syncronization, voicing many roles performed by Antonio Cifariello, Mario Merola, and Renato Salvatori.

In Rinaldi's animated film roles, he voiced Bruno Bozzetto's character Mr. Rossi in two films and a TV show, Pongo in the Italian dub of the 1961 animated film One Hundred and One Dalmatians as well as Prince Charming in the Italian version of Cinderella. Other animated dubbing roles included Jim Dear in Lady and the Tramp, The Great Prince of the Forest in the 1968 redub of Bambi and Dallben in The Black Cauldron. He also voiced Jolly Jumper in the 1991 live-action film Lucky Luke and in the following short-lived TV series (in the English language edition, the same character was voiced by Roger Miller).

=== Personal life ===
Rinaldi was once married to actress Marina Dolfin. They had two children together; Massimo and Antonella. From his second marriage to actress Maria Pia Casilio, they had one daughter; Francesca. All three of his children are voice actors.

Rinaldi died on 15 December 2007, aged 88. He had retired from his career 10 years earlier.

== Filmography ==
=== Cinema ===
Year	Title	Role	Notes
1939	Department Store	Skier	
1939	The Night of Tricks		
1939	Heartbeat		
1940	The First Woman Who Passes	Raoul d'Aubigny	
1940	Then We'll Get a Divorce	Bob	
1940	The Cavalier from Kruja	Essad Haidar	
1940	Tormented Hearts [it]	Paolo Antinori	
1941	The Man on the Street	Stelio Corsi	
1941	The Prisoner of Santa Cruz	Paolo Costa	
1942	Forbidden Music	Giulio Folchi	
1942	Disturbance	Saverio	
1942	Black Gold	Carlo Marini	
1943	Farewell Love!	Giustino Morelli	
1945	Romulus and the Sabines	Emilio	
1946	L'elisir d'amore [it]		
1947	L'amante del male	Cugino della contessina	
1947	Sangue a Ca' Foscari		
1948	Immigrants	Ingegnere	
1950	Night Taxi	Il ragionere	
1963	Outlaws of Love	Narrator	Anthology comedy
1970	A Pocketful of Chestnuts	Poker Player Doctor	
1972	Chung Kuo, Cina	Narrator (voice)	Documentary
1977	Mr. Rossi's Dreams	Mr. Rossi (voice)	Animated film
1978	Mr. Rossi's Vacation	Mr. Rossi (voice)	Animated film

=== Television ===
Year	Title	Role	Notes
1955	L'assassino	Corrado	TV play
1972–1981	SuperGulp!	Mr. Rossi (voice)	Animated series
1983	La fuggidiva	Rinaldi, the interviewer	TV film

=== Dubbing ===
==== Films (Animation, Italian dub) ====
Year	Title	Role(s)	Ref
1950	Cinderella	Prince Charming	
1955	Lady and the Tramp	Jim Dear	
1960	Alakazam the Great	Prince Amat	
1961	One Hundred and One Dalmatians	Pongo	
1966	Winnie the Pooh and the Honey Tree	Narrator	
1968	Winnie the Pooh and the Blustery Day	Narrator	
1968	Bambi	The Great Prince of the Forest (1968 redub)	
1985	The Black Cauldron	Dallben	
1986	Peter Pan	Captain Hook (1986 redub)	

==== Films (Live action, Italian dub) ====
Year	Title	Role(s)	Original actor	Ref
1946	It's a Wonderful Life	Marty Hatch	Harold Landon	
1964	Mary Poppins	George Banks	David Tomlinson	
1967	Casino Royale	Evelyn Tremble	Peter Sellers	
1972	The Godfather	Vito Corleone	Marlon Brando	
1973	Hitler: The Last Ten Days	Adolf Hitler	Alec Guinness	
1983	The World of Don Camillo	Crucifix	Allan Arbus	
1994	The Hudsucker Proxy	Sidney J. Mussburger	Paul Newman	
