= Mr. Rossi Looks for Happiness =

- U.S VHS cover
- Directed by: Bruno Bozzetto
- Written by: Bruno Bozzetto; Guido Manuli; Maurizio Nichetti
- Produced by: Bruno Bozzetto
- Starring: Carlo Romano; Gianfranco Mauri; Grazia Pivetti; Carlo Bonomi
- Edited by: Giancarlo Rossi
- Music by: Franco Godi
- Release date: 25 November 1976 (Italy)
- Running time: 81 minutes
- Country: Italy
- Language: Italian

Mr. Rossi Looks for Happiness (Italian: Il signor Rossi cerca la felicità) is a 1976 traditionally animated Italian feature film directed by Bruno Bozzetto. It was the first feature-length film in the Mr. Rossi franchise. The film follows the titular character as he tries to find a life he can be happy in by traveling through time with the help of a fairy named Sicura and the companionship of his boss's dog, Gastone.

== Plot ==
Mr. Rossi introduces himself and his life as an average factory worker constantly tormented by his rich boss. He tries hard to sound happy before eventually breaking down and asking for help while looking out his window at night. These cries alert Fairy Sicura (who is alternatively referred to as "Fata" in the English dub by Family Home Entertainment, which means "fairy" in Italian), a fairy who uses magic to keep people happy. Sicura says she can cure his misery by granting him a magical whistle that will take him any time period he wishes. Mr. Rossi blows the whistle to transport himself to a time before human history, but not before Gastone (who is alternatively referred to as "Harold" in the F.H.E. dub), the dog directed by Mr. Rossi's boss to bark at him constantly while he's outside, clamps onto the back of his shirt to leave with him.

Mr. Rossi and Gastone befriend one another as they are forced to rely on one another for survival against dinosaurs who want matches from Mr. Rossi to make fire, and then from combatants who try to kill Mr. Rossi for entertainment in the Roman Colosseum during the reign of the Roman Empire, learning to blow the whistle to escape trouble. After narrowly escaping alive, the pair return home to the present day, where the magic whistle is run over by a car and they are forced to return to their normal lives. Although the two have become friends, Mr. Rossi's life remains otherwise the same and, thus, he remains miserable.

Fairy Sicura, once again responding to Mr. Rossi's indirect cries for help from his window, says she can choose a travel location for Mr. Rossi's adventures with the magic whistle that will surely make him happy. After removing Gastone's ability to bark- to his and Mr. Rossi's despair- she drops the two off in the middle ages in an unspecified area of Europe, which she states is her period of origin. The pair escape royal guards and a royal opposition army after accidentally pulling out the tresses of a princess while trying to find shelter in her castle, transporting themselves to an unnamed remote island likely some time around from the 1600s-1800s. Sicura shows up once again to give Gastone, who has fallen into a large hole, the ability to speak like a human, before leaving. Upon finding a treasure chest, the two get into a fight with a parrot who tries to warn them about a pirate who will steal all of their gold. Angry, the parrot directs an unnamed African tribe to attack and eat the two. After they find their way home, Mr. Rossi vows to never travel through time again and throws away his second magic whistle.

Mr. Rossi, still upset with the circumstances with his life, is approached for a third time by Fairy Sicura, who suggests he tries traveling to the fantasy world of "The Fairytale Kingdom" rather than through real life. Gastone decides to tag along, and they meet with a variety of fantasy figures before they end up at Snow White's house, leading to Gastone being poisoned by a witch and having to be woken up with a kiss from a prince. The prince, angry at having been tricked by a witch into kissing a dog, the two, along with Mr. Rossi, down as the three escape to a time in Egypt during the reign of Tutankhamun. The witch walks off to find more people to poison, Mr. Rossi is enslaved by Tutankhamun to finish building a pyramid, and Gastone is taken in by the Egyptians as a God. Mr. Rossi drives away the worshippers of Gastone, transfers the two of them home, and throws away the third magic whistle.

Fairy Sicura finds Mr. Rossi again while flying around town and tries, to his dismay, to give him another magic whistle. He takes the whistle in attempts to get her to leave him alone, and leaves his house to pretend to use it. Gastone sees this and, thinking Mr. Rossi is actually trying to time travel again, blows the whistle to send the pair to the early colonial American West. They first must escape a shootout in which they have been set up to be killed, and then from a fatal fall down a waterfall made by massive rainstorm- a storm triggered by Gastone's harmonica performance for an unnamed Indigenous American tribe.

After noticing the pair's return home and Mr. Rossi's attempt to throw away her last magic whistle, Fairy Sicura offers to take the pair to the future, where everyone travels via flying houses that give them everything they need. Mr. Rossi accidentally flies himself into space, where policing is incredibly strict, and gets stuck with a prison sentence of 70 years. The three travel back to the present day one last time before Sicura tells Mr. Rossi that the only time period where he will be happy is the present and that his happiness must come from within rather than from a change of circumstance. Mr. Rossi then achieves this happiness by convincing his visiting boss to use the last magic whistle, removing the main source of stress from Mr. Rossi's life.

== Voice Cast ==
Character	Original	English
Mr. Rossi	Carlo Romano	Arthur Grosser
Fairy Sicura	Grazia Pivetti	Kathleen Fee
Gastone	Gianfranco Mauri	Vlasta Vrána
Boss	Carlo Bonomi	Neil Shee

== Home media ==
The original film received home releases on DVD in a set of all of the Mr. Rossi films and as a standalone DVD. The German dub of the film received a DVD release as a part of a box set spanning the Mr. Rossi franchise. An English dub of film- often referred to as the second English dub of the film due to its release after the British dub- was released by itself as a VHS tape in North America by Family Home Entertainment in 1983.

== See also ==
- List of animated feature-length films
