= Mr. Rossi's Vacation =

- Italian poster
- Directed by: Bruno Bozzetto
- Written by: Bruno Bozzetto; Guido Manuli; Maurizio Nichetti
- Produced by: Bruno Bozzetto
- Starring: Giuseppe Rinaldi; Gianfranco Mauri; Carlo Bonomi; Gianpaolo Rossi
- Edited by: Giancarlo Rossi
- Music by: Franco Godi
- Release date: 1978 (Italy)
- Running time: 80 minutes
- Country: Italy
- Language: Italian

Mr. Rossi's Vacation (Italian: Le vacanze del signor Rossi) is a 1978 traditionally animated Italian feature film directed by Bruno Bozzetto. It is the third and last film featuring Mr. Rossi.

== Plot ==
It's a story about Mr. Rossi and his dog who go on vacation and all the adventures they have, from being on a tyrannical farmer's farm and leading an animal revolt, to climbing the Andes, to heading to the beach and being serenaded by strange fish.

== Cast ==
Character	Original	English
Mr. Rossi	Giuseppe Rinaldi	Arthur Grosser
Gastone/Harold	Gianfranco Mauri	Vlasta Vrána
the purple sheep	Gianpaolo Rossi	Unknown
the good man	Gianpaolo Rossi	Unknown
Barba di Rame/a watchdog of the cruncher	Gianpaolo Rossi	Unknown

=== Additional voices ===
- Carlo Bonomi

== English ==
The film was dubbed into English in 1981.

== Home media ==
In the United States, the English dub version was released on VHS by Family Home Entertainment in 1985.

== See also ==
- Lists of animated films
