= List of Japanese films of 1976 =

A list of films released in Japan in 1976 (see 1976 in film).

Title	Director	Cast	Genre	Notes
1976
Assault! Jack the Ripper	Yasuharu Hasebe	Tamaki Katsura; Yutaka Hayashi	Roman porno / "Violent Pink"	
Baka Masa Hora Masa Toppa Masa				
Boso panikku: Dai gekitotsu	Kinji Fukasaku		Action	
Brother and Sister	Tadashi Imai	Kumiko Akiyoshi		
Cloistered Nun: Runa's Confession	Masaru Konuma	Runa Takamura	Roman porno	
Death at an Old Mansion	Yoichi Takabayashi			Entered into the 26th Berlin International Film Festival
Dojoji	Kihachiro Kawamoto		Folklore	
Frosty's Winter Wonderland	Arthur Rankin Jr., Jules Bass	Dennis Day, Paul Frees, Jackie Vernon, Shelley Winters	Animated	
Fumo Chitai	Satsuo Yamamoto	Hideji Otaki		
God Speed You! Black Emperor	Mitsuo Yanagimachi			
Gorenger: The Red Death Match				
Gorenger: Fire Mountain's Last Explosion				
Gorenger: The Bomb Hurricane				Only original Gorenger movie.; First original Super Sentai movie.
Hitogoroshi				
In the Realm of the Senses	Nagisa Oshima	Eiko Matsuda, Tatsuya Fuji	Drama romance	Japanese-French co-production
The Inugamis	Kon Ichikawa			Won Best Film at the 1st Hochi Film Award
Lady Moonflower	Katsuhiko Fujii	Naomi Tani	Roman porno	
The Little Drummer Boy: Book II	Jules Bass, Arthur Rankin Jr.		Animated	
New Battles Without Honor and Humanity: The Boss's Last Days				
Kimi yo funnu no kawa wo watare				
Kurutta yajû	Sadao Nakajima		Drama, Action, Crime	
Rudolph's Shiny New Year	Jules Bass, Arthur Rankin Jr.	Billie Mae Richards, Red Skelton, Morey Amsterdam, Frank Gorshin, Paul Frees, Don Messick, Harold Peary	Animated	
Sister Street Fighter – Fifth Level Fist	Shigehiro Ozawa	Etsuko Shihomi	Martial arts	
The Classroom of Terror				
Tora's Pure Love	Yoji Yamada	Kiyoshi Atsumi	Comedy	18th in the Otoko wa Tsurai yo series
Tora-san's Sunrise and Sunset	Yoji Yamada	Kiyoshi Atsumi	Comedy	17th in the Otoko wa Tsurai yo series
Watashi no sex-hakusho	Chûsei Sone		Drama	
Watcher in the Attic	Noboru Tanaka	Junko Miyashita	Roman porno	Adaptation of an Edogawa Rampo story
Yakuza Graveyard	Kinji Fukasaku	Tetsuya Watari	Yakuza	

== See also ==
- 1976 in Japan
- 1976 in Japanese television
