= Mr. Rossi's Dreams =

1977 film by Bruno Bozzetto

- Italian poster
- Directed by: Bruno Bozzetto
- Written by: Bruno Bozzetto; Guido Manuli; Maurizio Nichetti
- Produced by: Bruno Bozzetto
- Starring: Giuseppe Rinaldi; Gianfranco Mauri; Franco Godi; Carlo Bonomi; Gianpaolo Rossi
- Edited by: Giancarlo Rossi
- Music by: Franco Godi
- Release date: 1977 (Italy)
- Running time: 80 minutes
- Country: Italy
- Language: Italian

Mr. Rossi's Dreams (Italian: I sogni del signor Rossi) is a 1977 traditionally animated Italian feature film directed by Bruno Bozzetto. Is the second feature film of Mr. Rossi.

== Plot ==
After a long and tiring week of work, Mr. Rossi returns home to his home where the dog Gastone awaits him, who after a week of solitude wants to go out, run and go to the cinema. Because Gastone's heroes are those of the screen, television and literature, it is in these characters that the dog imagines as his master. We will then see a Rossitarzan, a Rossi-astronaut, Rossi-Holmes, Rossi-Zorro, Rossi-scientist, Rossi-Lancelot, Rossi-Aladino and Rossi-Hollywood actor. But once the dreams are over, for Rossi there will be a return to the mediocrity of his life.

== Cast ==
Character	Original	English
Mr. Rossi	Giuseppe Rinaldi	Arthur Grosser
Gastone/Harold	Gianfranco Mauri	Vlasta Vrána
lamp salesman	Franco Godi	Unknown
Herlotto	Carlo Bonomi	Unknown
farmer	Gianpaolo Rossi	Arthur Grosser

=== Additional Voices ===
- Original: Carlo Bonomi
- English: Arthur Grosser (Driver, Genie), Neil Shee (Narrator, Hippo, Tiger, Reporter, Dog, Pedro, Producer), Vlasta Vrána (Merlin, Bulldog, Genie, Servant)

== English voice actor ==
The dubbing was realized in the 1980s.

== See also ==
- List of animated feature-length films
