= Forbidden Music =

1942 film directed by Carlo Campogalliani

- Directed by: Carlo Campogalliani
- Written by: Carlo Campogalliani; Nino Vito Cavallo; Carlo Duse
- Produced by: Francesco Curato
- Starring: Tito Gobbi; María Mercader; Giuseppe Rinaldi
- Cinematography: Enzo Serafin; Giovanni Vitrotti
- Edited by: Mario Bonotti
- Music by: Ettore Campogalliani; Gian Luigi Centemeri
- Production companies: Appia Cinematografica; Elica Film
- Distributed by: Cine Tirrenia
- Release date: 22 October 1942
- Running time: 82 minutes
- Country: Italy
- Language: Italian

Forbidden Music (Italian: Musica proibita) is a 1942 Italian drama film directed by Carlo Campogalliani and starring Tito Gobbi, María Mercader and Giuseppe Rinaldi. An elderly composer recalls his youthful romance with a woman while a student in Florence.

It was made at the Fert Studios in Turin.

== Cast ==
- Tito Gobbi as Paolo Marini, detto Paolo Folchi
- María Mercader as Claretta Melzi
- Giuseppe Rinaldi as Giulio Folchi
- Loredana as Elena Landi
- Mario Casaleggio as Il maestro Bignami
- Carlo Romano as Otello
- Enzo Morisi as Arnaldo Rovere
- Carlo Duse as Il marchese Melzi
- Letizia Quaranta as La marchesa Beatrice Melzi
- Giorgio Costantini as Mario Melzi
- Mario Siletti as Il conte Landi, padre di Elena
- Ilena Jurick
- Valfrido Picardi as L'impresario Salvetti
- Lori Randi
- Giuseppe Zago

== Bibliography ==
- Bayman, Louis. The Operatic and the Everyday in Postwar Italian Film Melodrama. Edinburgh University Press, 2014.
