= Migoro! Tabegoro! Waraigoro!! =

Japanese television series (1976–1978)

- Genre: Variety
- Country of origin: Japan
- Original language: Japanese

Original release
- Network: NET
- Release: October 1976 – March 1978

Migoro! Tabegoro! Waraigoro!! (Japanese: みごろ!たべごろ!笑いごろ!!) was a Japanese variety television series first broadcast on NET between October 1976 and March 1978. The audience rating of the series reached more than 20%.

== Cast ==
- Shirō Itō
- Masao Komatsu
- Candies
- Yūzō Kayama

== Characters ==
Characters included Densen Man.

== Music ==
Songs included "Densen Ondo" (Japanese: 電線音頭) and "Shirake Tori Ondo" (Japanese: しらけ鳥音頭).

== Broadcast and release ==
A re-broadcast on CS communications satellite television began in 2025.

Migoro! Tabegoro! Waraigoro!! Candies Premium Box was released in 2010.

== See also ==
- 1976 in Japanese television
