= The Man on the Street =

- Directed by: Roberto Roberti
- Written by: Guglielmo Giannini; Ferdinando Spirito
- Starring: Armando Falconi; Carla Del Poggio; Giuseppe Rinaldi
- Cinematography: Arturo Gallea
- Music by: Alexandre Derevitsky
- Production company: Organizzazione Fulcro
- Distributed by: Variety Distribution
- Release date: 10 October 1941
- Running time: 85 minutes
- Country: Italy
- Language: Italian

The Man on the Street (Italian: La bocca sulla strada) is a 1941 Italian drama film directed by Roberto Roberti and starring Armando Falconi, Carla Del Poggio and Giuseppe Rinaldi.

It was made at Cinecittà in Rome. The film's sets were designed by Giuseppe Spirito and Fratelli Cimino

== Cast ==
- Armando Falconi as Don Gennaro Cuomo
- Carla Del Poggio as Graziella
- Giuseppe Rinaldi as Stelio Corsi
- Guglielmo Barnabò as L'industriale Sebastiano Corsi
- Vera Bergman as Alba Corsi
- Franco Rondinella as Salvatore
- Franco Coop as Il marchese Andrea Del Fermo
- Vittorina Benvenuti as Donna Olimpia Del Fermo
- Emilio Petacci as Il notaio
- Alfredo Martinelli as Il conte Rosati
- Alfredo Morati as Il duca D'Arcetri
- Luisa Ventura as Giovanna
- Giuseppe Ricagno as Il maggiordomo dei Del Fermo
- Sergio Leone as Un bambino
- Adele Paternò

== Bibliography ==
- Landy, Marcia. Italian Film. Cambridge University Press, 2000.
