= Lydia Simoneschi =

Italian voice actress (1908–1981)

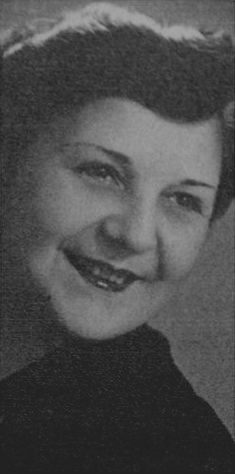
- Simoneschi in 1950
- Born: 4 April 1908; Rome, Italy
- Died: 5 September 1981 (aged 73); Rome, Italy
- Other names: Lidia Simoneschi
- Occupations: Actress; voice actress; dubbing director
- Years active: 1932–1976
- Spouse: Franz Lehmann (died 1942)
- Children: 2
- Father: Carlo Simoneschi

Lydia Simoneschi (4 April 1908 – 5 September 1981) was an Italian actress and voice actress. During her career, she gave her voice to actresses mainly during the Golden Ages.

== Biography ==
Born in Rome and the daughter of silent film actor and director Carlo Simoneschi, she began her acting career when she was very young in Camillo Pilotto's stage company; in the early 1930s she made her film debut, but her inconspicuous physical appearance did not help her in front of the camera. However, her persuasive, passionate and sophisticated voice paved the way for her to become a voice actress.

From the early 1940s until the first half of the 1960s, Simoneschi became one of the most prominent Italian voice actresses, lending her voice to almost all the greatest Hollywood and European divas which include Barbara Stanwyck, Susan Hayward, Ingrid Bergman, Marlene Dietrich, Joan Crawford, Olivia de Havilland, Vivien Leigh and Maureen O'Hara. In Simoneschi's animated roles, she provided the Italian voices of the Blue Fairy in Pinocchio, Flora in Sleeping Beauty, Madam Mim in The Sword in the Stone and the Fairy Godmother in the 1967 redub of Cinderella.

One of Simoneschi's main skills was that of being able to adapt very well to the different acting styles of the numerous actresses to whom she lent her voice. From 1964 she has also been a dubbing director and kept working in this environment until her retirement in 1976: in forty years of career as a voice actress, Simoneschi is estimated to have given her voice to over five thousand films.

=== Personal life ===
Simoneschi was married to Regia Marina member Franz Lehmann until his death in 1942. They had one son, Giorgio. She later had a second son, Gianni, with Franz Lehmann's brother Luigi on 9 May 1949. In the spring of 1980 the then President of Italy Sandro Pertini named her Knight of the Republic for her artistic merits.

== Death ==
Simoneschi died in Rome on 5 September 1981, at the age of 73.

== Filmography ==
=== Cinema ===
Year	Title	Role	Notes
1932	The Old Lady		
1932	Pergolesi	Nicoletta	
1933	Non c'è bisogno di denaro		
1936	Bayonet	Marina	
1958	Gli zitelloni	Moglie del presidente del tribunale	
1959	The Moralist	Vera's mother	

== Voice work ==
Year	Title	Role	Notes
1965	West and Soda	Esmeralda	Animated film
1968	VIP my Brother Superman	Happy Betty	Animated film
1975	King Dick	Esibizionista Cicciona	Animated film

=== Dubbing ===
==== Films (Animation, Italian dub) ====
Year	Title	Role(s)	Ref
1947	Pinocchio	The Blue Fairy	
1948	Bambi	Bambi's mother	
1959	Sleeping Beauty	Flora	
1960	Goliath II	Goliath II's mother	
1961	One Hundred and One Dalmatians	Nanny	
1963	The Sword in the Stone	Madam Mim	
1967	The Jungle Book	Winifred	
1967	Cinderella	Fairy Godmother (1967 redub)	
1973	Robin Hood	Lady Kluck	

==== Notable dubbed actresses ====
- Lauren Bacall
- Lucille Ball
- Anne Baxter
- Joan Bennett
- Ingrid Bergman
- Clara Calamai
- Claudette Colbert
- Valentina Cortese
- Joan Crawford
- Linda Darnell
- Danielle Darrieux
- Bette Davis
- Yvonne De Carlo
- Olivia de Havilland
- Marlene Dietrich
- Joan Fontaine
- Ava Gardner
- Lillian Gish
- Susan Hayward
- Katharine Hepburn
- Betty Hutton
- Jennifer Jones
- Lila Kedrova
- Deborah Kerr
- Angela Lansbury
- Vivien Leigh
- Gina Lollobrigida
- Sophia Loren
- Myrna Loy
- Ida Lupino
- Silvana Mangano
- Michèle Morgan
- Maureen O'Hara
- Eleanor Parker
- Donna Reed
- Ginger Rogers
- Eleonora Rossi Drago
- Jane Russell
- Margaret Rutherford
- Simone Signoret
- Barbara Stanwyck
- Gene Tierney
- Alida Valli
- Shelley Winters
- Jane Wyman
