= Shirō Itō =

Japanese actor (born 1937)

- Born: June 15, 1937 (age 89); Tokyo, Japan
- Occupations: Actor; comedian; television presenter
- Years active: 1958–2027 (scheduled)

Shirō Itō (伊東 四朗, Itō Shirō; born June 15, 1937) is a Japanese actor, comedian and television presenter.

== Filmography ==
=== Film ===
- Zatoichi and the One-Armed Swordsman (1971)
- Lupin III: Strange Psychokinetic Strategy (1974)
- Princess from the Moon (1987)
- A Taxing Woman (1987)
- Minbo (1992)
- Nin x Nin: Ninja Hattori-kun, the Movie (2004), Jinzo Hattori
- The Uchōten Hotel (2006)
- Talk Talk Talk (2007)
- Tsukiji Uogashi Sandaime (2008)
- The Hovering Blade (2009)
- The Hikita's Are Expecting! (2019)
- The Woman of S.R.I. the Movie (2021)
- Doctor-X: The Movie (2024), Ryunosuke Busujima

=== Television ===
- Ten to Chi to (1969)
- Oshin (1983–84), Tanimura Sakuzo
- Hōjō Tokimune (2001), Hōjō Masamura
- Shinsengumi! (2004)
- Clouds Over the Hill (2009)
- Onihei Hankachō, Amabiki no Bungorō (2009)
- The Waste Land (2009), Seizo Hisamatsu
- Taira no Kiyomori (2012), Emperor Shirakawa
- Doctor-X: Surgeon Michiko Daimon (2012)
- Taiga Drama ga Umareta Hi (2023)

=== Variety shows ===
- Migoro! Tabegoro! Waraigoro!!
- Ito Family (1997–2007)
- IQ Sapuri (2004–2009)
- Gaki no Tsukai (Youth High School, New Years Special) (2020)
