= Grasshoppers (Cavallette) =

- Directed by: Bruno Bozzetto
- Written by: Bruno Bozzetto
- Produced by: Bruno Bozzetto
- Music by: Roberto Frattini
- Release date: 6 March 1990 (Italy)
- Running time: 9 minutes
- Country: Italy
- Language: Italian

Grasshoppers (Cavallette) is an Italian animated short by Bruno Bozzetto which condenses the whole of human civilization into 9 minutes, focusing primarily on the human race's predilection for warfare and the vanity of war. It was nominated for an Academy Award for Best Animated Short Film in 1990, but lost to Aardman's Creature Comforts.

== Summary ==
Each piece of history is presented as a simple vignette, usually depicting a few simply-drawn characters arguing and making war, over and over again. Generally, a single figure is meant to stand in for an entire group (i.e., a single Caesar-like caricature for the entire line of Roman Emperors).

There is very little spoken dialogue; instead, most of the cartoon is accompanied by a bouncy piano-driven score, which frequently changes style to suit the particular historical era. The score, however, rests on a single simple theme, which is Antonín Dvořák's "Humoresque No. 7", to which it frequently returns in between vignettes.

== Plot ==
In the course of 9 minutes, Grasshoppers takes us through the following parts of history:

- The discovery of fire, and the development of tools and weapons, which Modern Man uses to remove the threat of the larger but less intelligent Neanderthal.
- Ancient Egypt: an animal worshipper clashes with a sun-worshipper.
- A tragedy in ancient Greece, where a dancer and a musician fall in love and are killed by a king, who is then attacked and defeated by the Roman Empire.
- The Roman Empire, represented by a single "Caesar-like" figure, who repeatedly sends troops off to plunder the cultures at the fringes of the empire, until they eventually come back to defeat the now lazy, unprepared later Empire. The birth of Jesus Christ is also alluded to, but it only distracts the warring parties for a split second.
- The continual fight for supremacy between the monarchies of medieval Western Europe (including an allusion to Joan of Arc).
- The rise of Islam, leading eventually to the Crusades.
- Genghis Khan's siege of China, and the construction of the Great Wall.
- The Spanish conquest of the Americas.
- The French Revolution
- The British/French Wars (possibly the wars of the First and Second Coalition).
- The American Revolution
- The Napoleonic Wars
- The United States' systematic removal of Native Americans
- World War II and Nazi Germany, which leads to the Atomic Age (a bright white flash from off-screen vaporizes goose-stepping Nazis, though not a literal occurrence, like many events in the cartoon, a metaphor for the fact that the atomic bomb effectively ended World War II, and ushered in a frightening new era).
- Recent years, up to the present day (1990, the year of the cartoon), which encompasses the Cold War, the Vietnam and/or Korean Wars, and the continual skirmishing that occurs still today, between all nations, organizations, and individuals.

As the centuries (and later decades) pass, the pace of the animation grows gradually faster and more frantic.

At the beginning and end of the cartoon, and occasionally in between vignettes, the cartoon abandons the struggles of humanity to focus briefly on a shot of grass growing and insects buzzing over the ruins of previous battles. In the final shot, the camera finally zooms in tighter on the grass to allow us to glimpse two grasshoppers happily mating.
