= Under the Chinese Restaurant =

- Italian theatrical release poster by Enzo Sciotti
- Directed by: Bruno Bozzetto
- Written by: Bruno Bozzetto; Fabio Comana
- Cinematography: Agostino Castiglioni
- Edited by: Roberto Frattini
- Music by: Ugo Rossi
- Release dates: April 16, 1987 (Milan, Italy)
- Country: Italy
- Language: Italian

Under the Chinese Restaurant (Italian: Sotto il ristorante cinese, also known as Trouble in Paradise) is a 1987 Italian fantasy-comedy film written and directed by Bruno Bozzetto. It is the first and only live action film by Bozzetto.

== Cast ==
- Claudio Botosso as Ivan
- Amanda Sandrelli as Eva
- Claudia Lawrence as Bibi
- Bernard Blier as The Professor
- Nancy Brilli as Ursula
- Giuseppe Cederna as Giovanni
- Cinzia Monreale as The Robber
- Haruhiko Yamanouchi as The Chinese Chef

== Release and reception ==
Sotto il ristorante cinese was released on April 16 in Milan, Turin, Genoa and Naples, Italy.

Deborah Young of Variety reviewed the film at the Cannes Film Market on May 9, 1987 and found the film well filmed as a whole, while adding that the "erotic candor sometimes seems precocious for kids who'd go for such an innocent tale."
