= IQ Sapuri =

Japanese game show

- 脳内エステ IQサプリ
- Genre: Game show
- Starring: Shiro Ito; Minako Nakano; Koji Imada; Hidehiko Ishizuka
- Country of origin: Japan
- Original language: Japanese

Production
- Producer: Kyodo Television
- Running time: 57 minutes

Original release
- Network: Fuji TV
- Release: April 24, 2004 – March 14, 2009

Beauty Treatment in the Brain IQ Supplement (脳内エステ IQサプリ, Nōnai Esute IQ Sapuri) is a Japanese game show that aired Saturday nights from 19:00-19:54 JST on Fuji TV. It consisted of mostly logic puzzles and brain teasers. Some examples of the games are:

- Kanji Puzzle
- Match Sticks
- Mis-match Manga
- Spot the Difference

Each game ends with Shiro Ito getting hit by Moyatto Balls.

== Video games ==
Two video games based on the game show called Beauty Treatment in the Brain IQ Supplement DS (脳内エステ IQサプリDS, Nōnai Esute IQ Sapuri Dii Esu) and Beauty Treatment in the Brain IQ Supplement DS 2: Refreshing Decisive Battle (脳内エステ IQサプリDS2 スッキリキング決定戦, Nōnai Esute IQ Sapuri Dii Esu Tsuu Sukkirikingu Kettei-sen) were published by Spike for the Nintendo DS in 2006 and 2007, respectively.
