= VIP my Brother Superman =

- Directed by: Bruno Bozzetto
- Screenplay by: Bruno Bozzetto; Attilio Giovannini; Guido Manuli
- Story by: Bruno Bozzetto
- Produced by: Leslie Parkyn; Julian Wintle
- Cinematography: Luciano Marzetti
- Edited by: Luciano Marzetti; Giancarlo Rossi
- Music by: Franco Godi
- Production company: Bruno Bozzetto Film
- Release date: 1968 (Italy)
- Running time: 79 minutes
- Country: Italy

VIP my Brother Superman (Italian: VIP, mio fratello superuomo), often known in English as The SuperVips, is a 1968 Italian animated superhero musical directed by Bruno Bozzetto. It is a parody of superheroes and enjoyed a good commercial and critical success. In 2008, it was followed by a 3D animation spin-off TV-series, PsicoVip.

== Plot ==
Recounting the adventures of the last in a line of Supermen, the film pokes fun at the processes that lie behind advertising, politics and our consumer society.

Bruno Bozzetto's animated satire about two descendants of superpowered beings, known as the Vips. One of these modern day superheroes—SuperVip, to be exact—is easily recognizable as such, possessing an Adonis-like physique, a dynamic personality and an array of heightened abilities. The other—MiniVip—is not quite so prepossessing. His growth is stunted, he wears horn-rimmed glasses, his paunch is wider than his chest, and his powers are a bit more limited than his brother's, being able only to fly through two little wings while emitting a small glow at night that makes him similar to a firefly. But both Vips are needed when a Happy Betty, lady tycoon with a taste for ruling the world, rears her ugly head. The question is, can MiniVip defeat his worst enemy—his intimidated ego—to help save the day?

== Cast ==
Character	Original	English
Mini VIP	Oreste Lionello	Unknown
Lisa	Fiorella Betti	Unknown
Nervustrella	Micaela Esdra	Unknown
Colonel	Corrado Gaipa	Unknown
Schultz	Pino Locchi	Unknown
Happy Betty	Lydia Simoneschi	Unknown

== Production ==
VIP, My Brother Superman was the second feature length animation made by director Bruno Bozzetto after his Western spoof West and Soda. Bozzetto felt that an American he refers to as Lady Robinson was "a real pain in the ass!" as she would come to Milan and felt "entitled to talk about the film, and came up with mind-blowing bullshit!" The character known as Happy Betty has slave employees in the film who are Asian, which led to American finances of the film to make objections. Bozzetto stated that Lady Robinson felt the film could not be sold to Japan with the Asian slave characters and asked to make them green.

== Release ==
My Brother Superman was released in Italy in 1968. In the United Kingdom and some other English-speaking countries, it is titled The SuperVips. An airing on Channel 4 in the U.K. in 1990 also used this title. The film was released on DVD in the United States by DigiView Entertainment as Vip, My Brother Superman. The film was also released on October 7, 2014, on All Regions DVD. This is a restored version of this film and the picture quality is improved compared to the DigiView release. The audio is in Italian 5.1 and Italian dual mono. This DVD has extra content, including a 45-minute interview with Bruno Bozzetto, storyboards and original promotional material.
