= 1976 in anime =

The events of 1976 in anime.

== Releases ==
English name	Japanese name	Type	Demographic	Regions
The Adventures of Huckleberry Finn	ハックルベリィの冒険 (Huckleberry no Bōken)	TV	Family	Portugal, Spain, Netherlands, Germany, Italy, France, Russia, Arabia, Japan, China (Taiwan), Korea
3000 Leagues in Search of Mother	母をたずねて三千里 (Haha o Tazunete Sanzenri)	TV	Family	Italy, Japan, Spain, Arabia, Germany, Philippines, China (Taiwan), Korea, Portugal, Russia
Gloizer X	グロイザーX (Guroizā X)	TV	Shōnen	Spain, Italy, Portugal, Japan, China (Taiwan)
Japanese Folklore Tales (Season 2)	まんが日本昔ばなし （第2期） (Manga Nihon Mukashi Banashi (Phase 2))	TV	Family	Japan
Paul's Miraculous Adventure	ポールのミラクル大作戦 (Pōru no Mirakuru Daisakusen)	TV	Children	Poland, Italy, Spain, Japan, Korea
UFO Robot Grendizer vs. Great Mazinger	UFOロボ グレンダイザー対グレートマジンガー (UFO Robo Gurendaizā tai Gurēto Majingā)	Movie	Shōnen	France, Spain, Arabia, Japan
Puss 'n Boots Travels Around the World	長靴をはいた猫 80日間世界一周 (Nagagutsu o Haita Neko: Hachijū Nichi-kan Sekaiisshū)	Movie	Family, Children	Spain, Italy, France, Netherlands, Poland, Japan, Russia
Gaiking	大空魔竜ガイキング (Daikū Maryū Gaikingu)	TV	Shōnen	Japan, Spain, Italy, Russia, Netherlands, United States
Dash Machine Hayabusa	ダッシュ！マシンハヤブサ (Dasshu! Mashin Hayabusa)	TV	Shōnen	Italy, Russia, Arabia, Japan
Cat Eyed Boy	妖怪伝 猫目小僧 (Yōkaiden Nekome Kozō)	TV	Shōnen	Japan
Go-wapper 5 Go-dam	ゴワッパー5ゴーダム (Gowappā Faibu Gōdamu)	TV	Shōnen	Japan, Italy
UFO Warrior Dai Apolon	UFO戦士ダイアポロン (Yūfō Senshi Dai Aporon)	TV	Shōnen	Japan, Spain, Italy
Combattler V	超電磁ロボ コン・バトラーブイ (Chōdenji Robo Konbatorā Bui)	TV	Shōnen	Japan, Philippines, Spain, Arabia, Chinese (Hong Kong), Chinese (Taiwan), Korea
The Adventures of Piccolino	ピコリーノの冒険 (Pikorīno no Bōken)	TV	Family, Children	Italy, Spain, Japan, France, Netherlands, Portugal, Germany, Arabia, Korea
Blocker Gundan 4 Machine Blaster	ブロッカー軍団IVマシーンブラスター (Burokkā Gundan IV Mashīn Burasutā)	TV	Shōnen	Japan, Italy, Philippines
Grendizer, Getter Robo G, Great Mazinger: Decisive Battle! The Monster of the Ocean	グレンダイザー・ゲッターロボG・グレートマジンガー 決戦!大海獣 (Gurendaizā Gettā Robo Jī Gurēto Majingā Kessen! Daikaijū)	Movie	Shōnen	France, Spain, Japan
Magnetic Robot Ga Keen	マグネロボ・ガ・キーン (Magunerobo Ga Kiin)	TV	Shōnen	Spain, Italy, Japan, Poland, Arabia, China (Taiwan)
The Affectuous Family	ほかほか家族 (Hoka Hoka Kazoku)	TV	Family, Children	Japan
Candy Candy	キャンディ・キャンディ (Kyandi Kyandi)	TV	Shōjo	France, Portugal, Italy, Spain, Russia, Arabia, Japan, Sweden, Philippines, Netherlands
Dinosaur Expedition Born Free	恐竜探検隊ボーンフリー (Kyōryū Tankentai Born Free)	TV	Shōnen	Italy, Arabia, Japan, China (Taiwan), Korea
The Magnificent Chief Clerk	花の係長 (Hana no Kakarichō)	TV	Seinen	Japan
Little Lulu and Her Little Friends	リトル・ルルとちっちゃい仲間 (Ritoru Ruru to Chitchai Nakama)	TV	Children	France, Spain, Italy, Japan, Portugal, Arabia
Dokaben	ドカベン (Dokaben)	TV	Shōnen	Japan, Italy
Manga Fairy Tales of the World	まんが世界昔ばなし (Manga Sekai Mukashi Banashi)	TV	Family	Portugal, Spain, Italy, Arabia, Japan, Korea
Robot Child Beeton	ろぼっ子ビートン (Robokko Beeton)	TV	Children	Japan
UFO Robot Grendizer: The Red Sunset Confrontation	UFOロボ グレンダイザー/赤い夕陽の対決 (Yūfō Robo Gurendaizā: Akai Yuuhi no Taiketsu)	Movie	Shōnen	Japan
Dojoji Temple	道成寺 (Dojoji Temple)	Short	Family	Japan

== See also ==
- 1976 in animation
