= Helios Techno Holding Co., Ltd. =

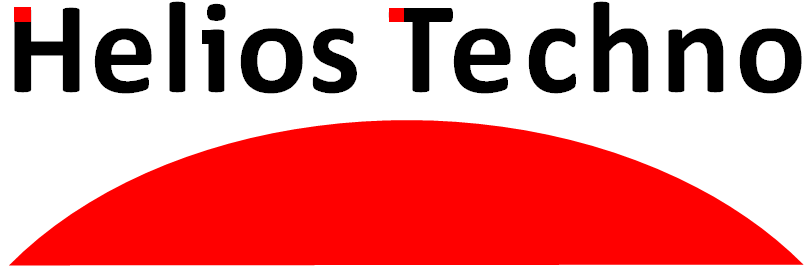
- Native name: ヘリオス テクノ ホールディング株式会社
- Company type: Public
- Traded as: TYO: 6927
- Industry: Holding company
- Predecessor: Phoenix Electric Co., Ltd
- Founded: 2009; 17 years ago
- Headquarters: Himeji, Japan
- Key people: Yoshihisa Sato (President)
- Revenue: ▲¥10.87 billion (2024); ¥7.99 billion (2023)
- Operating income: ▲¥1.47 billion (2024); ¥420 million (2023)
- Net income: ▲¥2.29 billion (2024); ¥270 million (2023)
- Number of employees: 277 (2024)
- Subsidiaries: Nakan Techno Co., Ltd.; Techno Provider Co., Ltd.; Lux Co., Ltd.; Pec Lamp Usa Corp.
- Website: heliostec-hd.co.jp

Helios Techno Holding (ヘリオス テクノ ホールディング株式会社, Heriosu Tekuno Hōrudingu Kabushiki Kaisha) is a Japanese holding company located in Himeji, Hyogo which is active in four business fields: lamps, manufacturing equipment, inspection equipment, and human resource services. It was formed in 2009 through business acquisition and integration instigated by Phoenix Electric Co. It is listed in the Tokyo Stock Exchange in the First Section.

== History ==
=== Timeline ===
- 1976 - Phoenix Electric Co., Ltd. was established.
- 1989 - The company was listed in JASDAQ.
- 1995 - The company applied Chapter 11.
- 1996 - Listing in JASDAQ was discontinued.
- 1997 - Patent "double seal" was appeared.
- 1998 - Chapter 11 was finished.
- 2002 - The company was listed in JASDAQ.
- 2004 - The company won Porter prize: Michael E. Porter.
- 2005 - The company was listed in the Second Section: Tokyo Stock Exchange.
- 2006 - The company acquired ISO14001.

The company was listed in the First Section.

== Large stock holders ==
- namco
- InFocus
