= Shinji Udaka =

Japanese baseball player (born 1976)

Shinji Udaka (宇高 伸次, Udaka Shinji) (born August 24, 1976 in Kadoma, Osaka) is a Japanese baseball player. He played for the Osaka Kintetsu Buffaloes from 1999 to 2003. In the 1999 draft, he was selected as the number 1 overall pick.
