= Mr. Rossi =

- First appearance: Un Oscar per il Signor Rossi (1960)
- Last appearance: "Rossi Boomer" (2025)
- Created by: Bruno Bozzetto
- Portrayed by: Carlo Romano, Giuseppe Rinaldi

In-universe information
- Species: Human
- Gender: Male
- Nationality: Italian

Mr. Rossi (Italian: Signor Rossi) is a cartoon character created by Italian animator Bruno Bozzetto. He was first seen in several short films, about ten minutes each. The show had a life span of 15 years with 6 episodes, 3 movies and 11 skits.

In Italy, Rossi is the most common surname, suggesting to the Italian viewer that Mr. Rossi stands for the average Italian man and that he could be anyone. He also appears in a couple of feature length animations, including one where he is seen unhappy in life and single, until he befriends his neighbour's talking dog Harold (Gastone in its original Italian) and a witch who grants him wishes, where they have many exciting adventures. In Italy the show was known as Il Signor Rossi cerca la felicità, whilst in English-speaking countries it was known as The Fantastic Adventures of Mr. Rossi (where it was broken down into a TV series for children's TV) or Mr. Rossi Looks for Happiness.

== Episodes ==
The Mr. Rossi short films were as follows (original Italian titles in parentheses):

1. An Award for Mr. Rossi (1959) (Un Oscar per il Signor Rossi)
2. Mr. Rossi goes Skiing (1963) (Il Signor Rossi va a sciare)
3. Mr. Rossi on the Beach (1964) (Il Signor Rossi al mare)
4. Mr. Rossi Buys a Car (1966) (Il Signor Rossi compra l'automobile)
5. Mr. Rossi at Camping (1970) (Il Signor Rossi al camping)
6. Mr. Rossi at the Safari (1971) (Il Signor Rossi al safari fotografico)
7. Mr. Rossi in Venice (1974) (Il Signor Rossi a Venezia)

These short films contained no spoken dialogue and any captions to accompany the film usually appeared in Italian, English, French, Spanish and German.

The feature length Mr. Rossi films include:

1. Mr. Rossi Looks for Happiness (1976) (Il Signor Rossi cerca la felicità)
2. Mr. Rossi's Dreams (1977) (I Sogni del signor Rossi)
3. Mr. Rossi's Vacation (1978) (Le Vacanze del signor Rossi)

In 1975, there was a short mini series called Mr. Rossi's Sporting Feats. It contained 11 episodes and each one was two minutes long approximately. Each episode focused on Mr. Rossi attempting to partake in one sport, with very unusual results.

These episodes featured the following:

1. Rowing
2. Fencing
3. Skiing
4. Gymnastics
5. Cycling
6. Athletics
7. Basketball / volleyball
8. Tennis
9. Swimming
10. Running
11. Football

In Bruno Bozzetto's 1976 feature-length film Allegro non troppo, Mr. Rossi briefly appears in an animation embedded in a live-action sequence.

Over 47 years later, Mr. Rossi would return to animation in the 2025 short film "Rossi Boomer."
