= West and Soda =

- 2006 DVD cover
- Directed by: Bruno Bozzetto
- Written by: Bruno Bozzetto; Attilio Giovannini
- Produced by: Bruno Bozzetto
- Starring: Nando Gazzolo; Vittoria Febbi; Carlo Romano
- Cinematography: Luciano Marzetti; Roberto Scarpa
- Music by: Giampiero Boneschi
- Production company: Cineriz
- Release date: 1 October 1965 (Italy)
- Running time: 86 minutes
- Country: Italy
- Language: Italian

West and Soda (also known as The West Way Out) is a 1965 Italian animated Western comedy film directed by Bruno Bozzetto. It is a parody of the traditional American Western.

In an interview, Bozzetto claimed to have invented the Spaghetti Western genre with this film, an achievement usually attributed to Sergio Leone with his A Fistful of Dollars which was released the year before, but whose development started later and was faster than the traditionally animated West and Soda.

== Plot ==
The plot of the film follows the traditional stranger arriving in a small western town. The stranger finds a pretty woman holding out from selling her uniquely green land to the local big shot, who is harassing her in hope of seducing her/buying her land. There is an ongoing mystery about how the stranger got a hold of the gold nugget he possesses, though at the end of the film it is revealed that he found it in a soap box (it is fake).

== Cast ==
Character	Original	English
Johnny	Nando Gazzolo	Unknown
Clementine	Vittoria Febbi	Unknown
The Boss	Carlo Romano	Unknown
Ursus	Luigi Pavese	Unknown
Slim	Willy Moser	Unknown
Esmeralda	Lydia Simoneschi	Unknown
The Boss's Horse	Ferruccio Amendola	Unknown

== DVD ==
A PAL R2 DVD of the film has been released in Italy. It contains 40 minutes of extra material, including interviews, a completely restored version of the film as well as English subtitles.

== See also ==
- List of animated feature-length films
