= Arthur Grosser =

American actor and chemist

Arthur Grosser is a Canadian actor and chemist who was a professor of physical chemistry at McGill University, Montreal. He has done a lot of voice acting work in several animated series as well as in video games such as Ubisoft's Splinter Cell and Assassin's Creed. A native of Brooklyn, New York City, he is the author of the 1981 book Cookbook Decoder, among other chemistry textbooks, and has had parts in several movies, his latest is the 2013 movie Honeymoon (live-action).

== Filmography ==
=== Television ===
- Seeing Things (1981) - Coroner, Leopold, Dr. Rogers
- Ultra Seven (1985) - Manabe (voice)
- The Happy Castle (1989) (voice)
- Urban Angel (1991) - Bill Rack

=== Film ===
- Ford: The Man and the Machine (1987) - Junior Partner
- Charlie Strapp and Froggy Ball Flying High (1991) - Kung Tallkotte
- Café Olé (2000) - Sydney Purvis
- Hellhounds (2009) - Charon (voice)
- Barney's Version (2010) - Mr. Dalhousie

=== Animation/Anime ===
- John the Fearless (1984)
- The Wonderful Wizard of Oz (1986) - Lord Kaliko
- Adventures of the Little Koala (1987) - Duckbill
- Diplodos (1988) - Bubbles
- Jungle Book Shōnen Mowgli (1989) - Bagheera
- Saban's Adventures of Pinocchio (1990) - Dr. Sorrow
- Sharky & George (1990) - Dr. Jake Eel
- The Littl' Bits (1990) - Mayor Bossabit
- C.L.Y.D.E. (1991) - Alberto
- Second Debut (1991)
- Samurai Pizza Cats (1991) - Bad Max (aka Crow Magnon)
- The Great Cheese Conspiracy (1991) - Conrad
- The Little Lulu Show (1995) – Mr. Jim Tompkins
- Arthur (1996) – Mr. Marco
- Bob Morane (1998) - Professeur Clairembart
- Bad Dog (1998) - Additional Voices
- Papyrus (1998) - Raouser
- Wunschpunsch (2000) - Additional Voices
- What's with Andy? (2003) - Additional Voices
- Hugo the Movie Star (2005) - Dr. Loongkoffer
- Bonifacio in Summertime (2011)
- Pinocchio (2012) - I, Phineas Cricket

=== Video games ===
- Splinter Cell (2002) - Additional Voices
- Far Cry Instincts (2005)
- Assassin's Creed II (2009) - Jacopo de' Pazzi
- Assassin's Creed: Lineage (2009) - Pope Sixtus IV
