= Piccolino no Bōken =

1976 Japanese anime series

- The DVD set cover
- ピコリーノの冒険
- Genre: Fantasy, adventure
- Based on: The Adventures of Pinocchio by Carlo Collodi
- Written by: Iwao Yamazaki; Masao Maruyama; Shûji Yamazaki; Yutaka Kaneko
- Directed by: Shigeo Koshi; Hiroshi Saitô
- Music by: Taiji Nakamura (Japanese version); Karel Svoboda (German version)
- Countries of origin: Japan; West Germany
- Original language: Japanese
- No. of episodes: 52

Production
- Executive producer: Kōichi Motohashi
- Producers: Ihiro Oba; Tadami Watanabe
- Editor: Hajime Okayasu
- Production companies: Asahi Broadcasting Corporation; Nippon Animation; Apollo Film

Original release
- Network: ANN (ABC, TV Asahi) (Japan); ZDF (Germany)
- Release: April 27, 1976 – May 31, 1977

Piccolino no Bōken (ピコリーノの冒険, Pikorīno no Bōken; lit. 'Adventures of Pinocchio') is a 52-episode anime series by Nippon Animation first aired in 1976 which was created in coproduction with the German TV station ZDF and the Austrian TV station ORF. The story is based on the novel The Adventures of Pinocchio (1883) by Italian author Carlo Collodi.

== Plot ==
Although the plot was slightly changed from that of the original story, the basis remained similar.

Set in a small village in the Tuscany district in Italy, the story starts with a poor old carpenter named Geppetto, who lives alone. One day, Geppetto Decides to carve a marionette, from which comes to life and becomes the child he never had. Geppetto decides to call him "Pinocchio".

Later on, Geppetto convinces Pinocchio to start going to the local school. Pinocchio sets out towards the school, but on his way, he meets the Fox (who is pretending to be limping) and the Cat (who is pretending to be blind) who manage to persuade him to join them in a walk to the theater to watch a puppet show and then sell it to the owner of that theater. Without knowing, Pinocchio is forced to join the puppet theater. Pinocchio performs in the theater in different cities and, after he played a role in the show which shows himself's story escaping from Geppetto's house, The owner of the theater lets him go and return home with the gold coins he earned.

On the way home, Pinocchio meets the fox and the cat again, who have decided to trick Pinocchio. They tell him that if he plants the coins in the fields of wonder, they would rapidly grow into a large tree which each of them produce 500 new golden coins. Pinocchio doesn't understand that they are trying to trick him, even though Pinocchio's companion, Gina the duckling, tries to warn him. Pinocchio, who believes to their lies, follows the fox and the cat towards the fields of wonder. They stop at an inn, where the cat and fox eat a full meal on Pinocchio's expense. During the night, the inn keeper wakens Pinocchio, notifying him that the fox and cat had to leave urgently, but they would meet Pinocchio at the fields of wonder. Pinocchio sets out immediately towards the fields of wonder. When he passes through the forest, he meets the fairy, which tells him that he should head to the forest to find the fields of wonder. At the forest, the fox and cat, who are dressed up as robbers, surprise attack him and try to rob Pinocchio. Pinocchio manages to run away. While running into the forest, the cat and the fox (who are still in disguise) manage to seize Pinocchio, and they hang him on a tree in order to retrieve the golden coins. Pinocchio holds on to the golden coins and, eventually, the fox and the cat decide to leave him hanging on the tree. The fairy with turquoise hair appears later on and rescues Pinocchio.

After Pinocchio continues his journey towards his home, along the way, he meets the Fox and the cat yet again (although he doesn't know that they were the robbers who tried to steal his golden coins). They remind Pinocchio about the fields of wonder, and he agrees to follow them once again in order to plant the golden coins. When they reach the fields of wonder, Pinocchio plants the golden coins in the soil, and while he goes to get water, the fox and the cat dig up the golden coins and quickly disappear. After Pinocchio discovers that he was a victim of fraud, he goes back to Geppetto.

Later on, Pinocchio, The fox and the cat, and several children join a wanderer, who leads them towards the land of toys, which consists of amusement facilities and as much candy as they desire. The next morning Pinocchio and his friends wake up and discover that they have transformed into donkeys during the night, the real reason for which they were initially brought to the land of toys by the wanderer. The donkeys are later on taken to the market and sold by the wanderer to a circus. Only after Pinocchio understands that the curse would be removed only after he would change his ways and would start doing good deeds, does he decide to change his ways. After Pinocchio manages to save the circus from burning in a big fire, he transforms back to his former-self.

Later on, Geppetto is tricked by the fox and the cat and, therefore, he sets out to search for Pinocchio in the ocean. After Pinocchio discovers that, he decides to search for Geppetto. While searching for Geppetto out in the ocean, Pinocchio gets swallowed by a whale. In the whale's stomach, he meets Geppetto (who had also been swallowed by the whale). Pinocchio manages to find the courage and wisdom needed to get himself and Geppetto out of the whale's stomach safely.

Eventually, as a token to Pinocchio's good deeds, the fairy with turquoise hair decides to transform Pinocchio into a real boy.

== Comparison with the original story ==
- The roles of the fox and the blind cat were expanded and transformed into "the bad but entertaining" figures. In most of the series episodes, their mischief and often criminal behavior used Pinocchio's naivety and kindness, and practically generated most of the events in the series.
- The role of the Talking Cricket, which represents Pinocchio's conscience, was replaced with a little duckling and a woodpecker.
- The role of the Fairy with Turquoise Hair was also expanded and she gets to rescue Pinocchio from harm several times while she transforms herself into different forms including a giant pigeon (the Fairy's role was merged with that of the Pigeon from Collodi's original book).

== Characters ==
- Pinocchio (Masako Nozawa)
- Gina the duck (Kazuko Sugiyama)
- Boro the fox (Sanji Hase)
- Giulietta the cat (Miyoko Asou)
- Geppetto (Junji Chiba)
- Nymph (Mami Koyama)
- Rocco the bird (Kaneta Kimotsuki)
- Dora the cat (Ichirô Nagai)
