= Bruno Bozzetto =

Italian cartoonist and animator (born 1938)

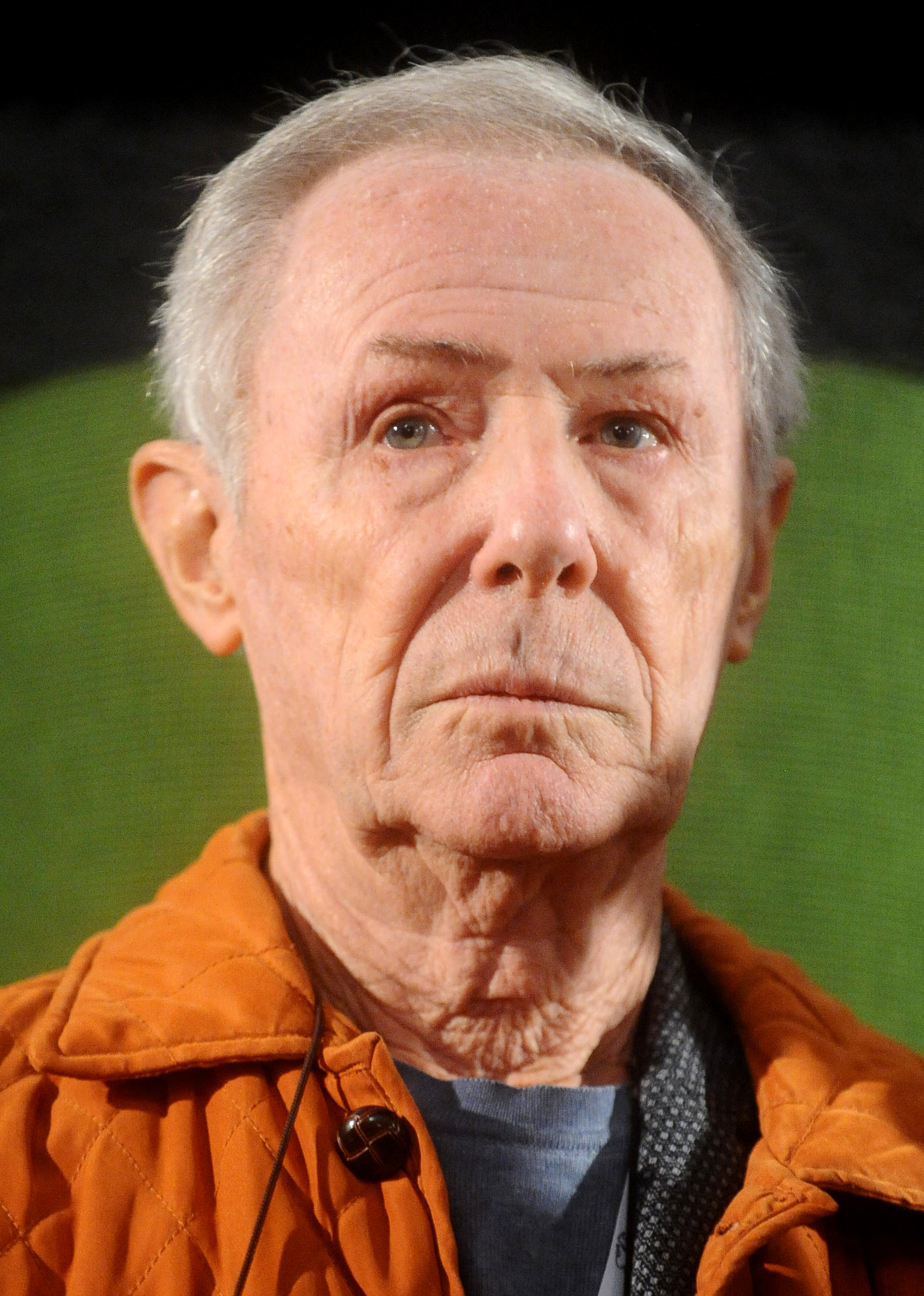
- Bruno Bozzetto at Lucca Comics & Games 2016
- Born: 3 March 1938 (age 88); Milan, Kingdom of Italy
- Occupation: Director
- Years active: 1958–present
- Known for: West and Soda; Mr. Rossi; Allegro non troppo

Bruno Bozzetto (born 3 March 1938) is an Italian cartoonist, animator and film director. He is known for his political and satirical productions. He created his first animated short, "Tapum! the weapons' story" in 1958 at the age of 20. His most famous character, a hapless little man named "Signor Rossi" (English: Mr. Rossi), has been featured in many animated shorts as well as starring in three feature films: Mr. Rossi Looks for Happiness (1976), Mr. Rossi's Dreams (1977), and Mr. Rossi's Vacation (1977).

== Biography ==
In 1965, Bozzetto produced his first feature-length animated film: West and Soda, a parody of American Western films. In 1968, Bozzetto released VIP my Brother Superman, a superhero parody. However, his best-known work is probably the 1976 feature film Allegro non troppo, a collection of short pieces set to classical music in the manner of Walt Disney's Fantasia, but more humorous in nature, economical in execution and with more sophisticated narrative themes. After a long break, Bozzetto produced a live-action film in 1987, Under the Chinese Restaurant, his last feature film work until assisting on the pilot for Mammuk (2002), an animated film set in prehistoric times (now being produced by Rai Cinema and The Animation Band).

1990 saw the release of Grasshoppers (Cavallette), which was an Academy Award nominee for the Academy Award for Best Animated Short Film in 1991.

Although he gained critical acclaim and personal satisfaction primarily through his feature-length cartoons and the series Signor Rossi, in the 1980s and the first half of the 1990s he was known to most of Europe for the short cartoon series he created for the Swiss television RSI in collaboration with Guido Manuli.

- Stripy (1973 - 1984, 13 episodes of 9’ each)

Stripy is an animated character known for his cheerful approach to life. He became an easily recognizable personage largely due to the distinctive laugh created by Carlo Bonomi and for his catchy theme music.

- Lilliput Put (1980, 13 episodes of 6’ each)

A serial of episodes which tell a story about several insects, that are, the caterpillar, the grasshopper, the mosquito, the ant, the worm, the cricket, the snail, the flea, the dragonfly, the ladybird, the termite, the bee and the spider.

- Mr. Hiccup (1983, 39 episodes of 3’ each)

A serial about a character with the longest hiccups in the world.

The three cartoon series were extremely successful, especially in the Central European countries.

In 1995, he produced an animated short for Hanna-Barbera's What a Cartoon! series entitled Help? and in 1996, in cooperation with RAI and with the support of Cartoon (Media Programme of the European Union), he created The Spaghetti Family, a 26-episode cartoon television series.

Since 1999, Bozzetto turned to flash cartoons, most notably with the award-winning Europe and Italy, a commentary on European vs. Italian socio-cultural attributes. He also laid inspiration for the countryballs meme.

In 2018, Bozzetto wrote Minivip & Supervip - Il mistero del Via Vai, a graphic novel featuring the characters from his 1968 film, with artwork by Grégory Panaccione. The two also collaborated on Tugèin, published by ReNoir Comics in 2022.

== Filmography ==
=== Feature films ===
- West and Soda (1965)
- The SuperVips (Vip - Mio fratello superuomo, 1968)
- Mr. Rossi Looks for Happiness (1976)
- Allegro non troppo (1976)
- Mr. Rossi's Dreams (I sogni del Signor Rossi, 1977)
- Mr. Rossi's Vacation (Le vacanze del Signor Rossi, 1978)
- Under the Chinese Restaurant (Sotto il ristorante cinese, 1987)

=== Shorts ===
This list is only a short sampling of the many shorts Bozzetto has put out over the years.

- Life in a Tin (1967)
- Ego (1969)
- Opera (1973)
- Self Service (1974)
- Striptease (1977)
- Baby Story (1978)
- Moa Moa (1984)
- Baeus (1987)
- Grasshoppers (Cavallette) (1990)
- Big Bang (1990)
- Dancing (1991)
- Help? (1996, aired as part of What a Cartoon!)
- Europe vs. Italy (1999)
- Yes & No - A Dyseducational Road Movie (2001)
- Adam (2002)
- Olympics (2003)
- Mr. Otto in 17 (2004)
- Looo (2004)
- Sex and Fun (2007)
- Camuni (2009)
- Lazy Dog (2012)
- EU and USA (2018)
- Ecosystem (2019)
- Sapiens? (2024)

== Awards (selected recent) ==
- (2003) Bergamo International Cinema Festival: Career award (Premio delle mura)
- (2001) Tehran Second International Animation Festival: Special Award of the Jury (“Europe and Italy”)
- (2000) World Festival of Animated Film - Animafest Zagreb: Special Jury Award "for original observation of human diversity"
- (1998) Animafest Zagreb: Life Achievement Award "for outstanding and universal contribution to the development of the art of animation"
