= Allegro non troppo =

- Theatrical release poster
- Directed by: Bruno Bozzetto
- Written by: Bruno Bozzetto; Guido Manuli; Maurizio Nichetti
- Produced by: Bruno Bozzetto
- Starring: Maurizio Micheli; Maurizio Nichetti; Néstor Garay; Maurialuisa Giovannini
- Cinematography: Mario Masini
- Music by: Recordings from Deutsche Grammophon
- Production companies: Bruno Bozzetto Film; Ministero del Turismo e dello Spettacolo (uncredited)
- Distributed by: Roxy International (1977) (Italy); Specialty Films (1977) (USA) (subtitled)
- Release dates: 12 March 1976 (Italy, limited release); 22 December 1977 (Italy)
- Running time: 85 minutes
- Country: Italy
- Language: Italian

Allegro non troppo is a 1976 Italian animated film directed by Bruno Bozzetto. Featuring six pieces of classical music, the film is a parody of Walt Disney's 1940 feature film Fantasia, two of its segments being derived from the earlier film. The classical pieces are set to color animation and present both comedic, tragic and tragicomic stories.

A framing device at the beginning and in between segments presents black and white live-action sequences, displaying the fictional animator, orchestra, conductor and filmmaker, with humorous scenes about the fictional production of the film. Some of these sections mix animation and live action.

The film was released in two versions. The first includes live action sequences in between the classical pieces; the second version of the film omits them, replacing them with animated Plasticine letters spelling out the title of the next piece of music.

While Allegro non troppo spoofs its source, The Walt Disney Company has been positively receptive towards the film. Disney veteran Ward Kimball would recommend the Boléro segment to his animation students, and the Walt Disney Family Museum held an exhibit on Bruno Bozzetto, featuring his work on the film.

== Title ==
In music, an instruction of "allegro ma non troppo" means to play "fast, but not overly so". Without the "ma", the Italian sentence should be rewritten as "non troppo allegro", which literally means "not so happy", and in musical terms it could be interpreted as "not too fast". While "allegro ma non troppo" bears a positive connotation (as in "happy, just not so much"), "non troppo allegro" sounds more negative (as in "not really that happy").

== Program ==
- Claude Debussy's Prélude à l'après-midi d'un faune: an elderly satyr repeatedly attempts to cosmetically recapture his youth and virility, but all in vain. With each failure, the satyr gets smaller and smaller, until he roams across a vast countryside which turns out to be a woman's body.
- Antonín Dvořák's Slavonic Dance No. 7, Op. 46, begins in a large community of cliff-side cave-dwellers. A solitary caveman, wanting to better himself, goes out onto the plain and builds himself a new home. From this point on, the rest of the community copies everything that he does. Annoyed that everyone is able to keep up with his advances so quickly, his attempts to break away from them leads to his planning a bizarre act of mass vengeance with unintended and humorous consequences.
- Maurice Ravel's Boléro: liquid at the bottom of a Coca-Cola bottle left behind after a visit by a spacecraft acquires life, and progresses through fanciful representations of the stages of evolution and history until skyscrapers erupt from the ground and destroy all that has come before. This segment parallels The Rite of Spring segment from Fantasia, complete with a solar eclipse. Its opening moment was used as the image for the film poster.
- Jean Sibelius's Valse triste: a solitary cat wanders in the ruins of a large house. The cat remembers the life that used to fill the house when it was occupied. These images fade away, as does the cat, just before the ruins are demolished.
- Antonio Vivaldi's Concerto in C major, RV 559: a female bee prepares to dine on a flower in elaborate style, complete with utensils and a portable TV. She suffers a number of interruptions by two lovers having a romantic interlude on the nearby grass.
- Igor Stravinsky's The Firebird (specifically The Princesses' Khorovod and The Infernal Dance of King Katschey) begins in claymation during which God, which after a number of false starts, creates Adam and Eve as portrayed in Genesis. The action by then has switched to cel animation. The Serpent of Eden comes up to them, but fails, and swallows the apple. The serpent then undergoes a symbolic Fall of Man.
- In an epilogue sequence, the film's host asks an animated Igor-type monster (called "Franceschini") to retrieve a finale for the film from a basement storeroom. Franceschini rejects several of these, but approves of one which depicts an escalating series of accidents featuring an assortment of short orchestral clips. Among them are Johannes Brahms' Hungarian Dance No. 5, Johann Sebastian Bach's Toccata and Fugue in D minor, Dvorak's Slavonic Dance No. 7 (from before) and Franz Liszt's Hungarian Rhapsody No. 2.

== Source of music ==
All of the recordings used in the film were courtesy of Deutsche Grammophon.

=== Live action sequences ===
The film has a framing device shot in live action black and white, referring the opening of Deems Taylor's introductions from Fantasia, including the Presenter (Maurizio Micheli) starts off with an exaggerated version of Taylor's opening introduction in the earlier film. The Orchestra Master" (Néstor Garay) and an orchestra made up of old ladies as the Orchestra Master. The Presenter introduces the Animator (Maurizio Nichetti). A pretty young cleaning woman (Marialuisa Giovannini) also appears in each segment. The sequence includes tongue-in-cheek references to Walt Disney's work, including Fantasia.

== Cast ==
Character	Original actor	English voice
The Presenter	Maurizio Micheli	Unknown
The Animator	Maurizio Nichetti	Unknown
The Orchestra Master	Néstor Garay	Unknown
The Cleaning Girl	Maurialuisa Giovannini	Unknown
Man in Gorilla Costume	Osvaldo Salvi	Unknown

== Release ==
Allegro non troppo released in Italy on March 12, 1976, and released in the United States a year later.

On 12 February 2026, GKIDS acquired North American rights to Bozzetto's output, including Allegro; a 50th-anniversary re-release of the latter (double-billed with Fantasia (which was re-released by Walt Disney Studios Motion Pictures through the Walt Disney Pictures banner) on 29 March) was re-released on 27 March.

== Reception ==
Allegro non troppo holds a 90% "Fresh" rating at Rotten Tomatoes based on 20 reviews. Film journalist Phil Hall wrote that the Valse triste sequence was "genuinely heartbreaking" and "one of the most beautiful [sequences] in animation history." Janet Maslin of The New York Times said "His [Bozzetto’s] movie is full of clashing colors and incongruous styles, with characters inspired by anything from Keane paintings to herbal shampoo commercials. The best that can be said for such a mélange is that it is genuinely exhausting."

Allegro non troppo was given a Critics' Referendum Prize at the Yellow Kid Awards in Lucca in 1976.

== See also ==
- List of animated package films
