= List of animated television series of 1976 =

A list of animated television series first aired in 1976.

Animated television series first aired in 1976
| Title | Episodes | Country | Year | Notes | Technique |
|---|---|---|---|---|---|
| 3000 Leagues in Search of Mother | 52 | Japan | 1976 | | Anime |
| Die Abenteuer der Maus auf dem Mars | 52 | Austria; Hungary; Switzerland; West Germany; Yugoslavia | 1976–82 | | Traditional |
| Albert et Barnabé | 10 | France | 1976 | | Stop Motion |
| Blocker Gundan 4 Machine Blaster | 38 | Japan | 1976–77 | | Anime |
| Candy Candy | 115 | Japan | 1976–79 | | Anime |
| Cat Eyed Boy | 24 | Japan | 1976 | | Anime |
| Chōdenji Robo Combattler V | 54 | Japan | 1976–77 | | Anime |
| Chorlton and the Wheelies | 40 | United Kingdom | 1976–79 | | Stop Motion |
| Clue Club | 16 | United States | 1976 | | Traditional |
| Dokaben | 163 | Japan | 1976–79 | | Anime |
| Dynomutt, Dog Wonder | 20 | United States | 1976–77 | Spin-off of The Scooby-Doo Show. Originally a segment on The Scooby-Doo/Dynomutt Hour | Traditional |
| Fred Basset | 20 | United Kingdom | 1976 | | Traditional |
| Gaiking | 44 | Japan | 1976–77 | | Anime |
| Gideon | 60 | France | 1976 | | Traditional |
| Gowappa 5 Gōdam | 36 | Japan | 1976 | | Anime |
| Groizer X | 36 | Japan | 1976–77 | | Anime |
| Hoka Hoka Kazoku | 1428 | Japan | 1976–82 | | Anime |
| Huckleberry no Bōken | 26 | Japan | 1976 | | Anime |
| Jabberjaw | 16 | United States | 1976 | | Traditional |
| Jamie and the Magic Torch | 39 | United Kingdom | 1976–79 | | Traditional |
| Kagee Mukashibanashi | 65 | Japan | 1976–79 | | Anime |
| Kyoryu Tankentai Born Free | 25 | Japan | 1976–77 | | Anime |
| Little Lulu and Her Little Friends | 26 | Japan | 1976–77 | | Traditional |
| Machine Hayabusa | 21 | Japan | 1976 | | Anime |
| Magne Robo Gakeen | 39 | Japan | 1976–77 | | Anime |
| Manga Furusato Mukashi Banashi | 26 | Japan | 1976 | | Anime |
| Manga Hana no Kakarichō | 25 | Japan | 1976–77 | | Anime |
| Manga Nihon Mukashi Banashi | 1471 | Japan | 1976–94 | | Anime |
| Manga Sekai Mukashi Banashi | 127 | Japan | 1976–79 | | Anime |
| Margo the Mouse | 13 | Poland | 1976–83 | | Traditional |
| Misterjaw | 34 | United States | 1976 | | Traditional |
| Monica and Friends | 230 | Brazil | 1976–2022 | Currently the longest-running Brazilian television series in the world. | Traditional/Flash |
| The Mumbly Cartoon Show | 16 | United States | 1976–77 | Originally a segment on The Tom & Jerry/Grape Ape/Mumbly Show. | Traditional |
| Noah and Nelly in... SkylArk | 15 | United Kingdom | 1976–77 | | Traditional |
| Pachyderm Story | 3 | France | 1976 | | Traditional |
| Paddington | 56 | United Kingdom | 1976–86 | | Stop-motion |
| Pat & Mat | 130 | Czech Republic | 1976–20 | | Stop-motion |
| Paul's Miraculous Adventure | 50 | Japan | 1976–77 | | Anime |
| Piccolino no Bōken | 52 | Japan | 1976–77 | | Anime |
| The Red and the Blue | 39 | Italy | 1976 | | Stop-motion |
| Robokko Beeton | 50 | Japan | 1976–77 | | Anime |
| Rubovia | 6 | United Kingdom | 1976 | | Stop-motion |
| The Scooby-Doo Show | 40 | United States | 1976–78 | Spin-off of Scooby-Doo, Where Are You!. Originally a segment on The Scooby-Doo/Dynomutt Hour. | Traditional |
| The Scooby-Doo/Dynomutt Hour | 16 | United States | 1976 | | Traditional |
| Shin Don Chuck Monogatari | 73 | Japan | 1976–78 | | Anime |
| Tarzan, Lord of the Jungle | 36 | United States | 1976–80 | | Traditional |
| UFO Warrior Dai Apolon | 47 | Japan | 1976–77 | | Anime |

== See also ==
- List of animated feature films of 1976
- List of Japanese animation television series of 1976
