= List of animated feature films of 1976 =

This is a list of animated feature films first released in 1976.

== List ==
Title	Country	Director	Production company	Animation technique	Format	Notes	Release date	Duration
Agaton Sax and the Bykoebing Village Festival; Agaton Sax och Byköpings gästabud	Sweden	Stig Lasseby	Svensk Filmindustri (SF); Svenska Filminstitutet (SFI); Teamfilm AS	Traditional	Theatrical		November 20, 1976	77 minutes
Allegro Non Troppo; Not Too Cheerful	Italy	Bruno Bozzetto	Bruno Bozzetto Film	Traditional	Theatrical		March 12, 1976	85 minutes
Brigand Jurko; Brigand Jurko	Czechoslovakia	Viktor Kubal	Slovenská filmová tvorba, Stúdio hraných filmov Bratislava – Koliba	Traditional	Theatrical			76 minutes
Cheorin 007 철인 007 (Iron Man 007)	South Korea	Han Ha-lim	Dong-A Advertising	Traditional	Theatrical		December 13, 1976	62 minutes
Colargol in the Wild West; Colargol na Dzikim Zachodzie	Poland	Tadeusz Wilkosz	Se-ma-for	Stop motion	Theatrical			
Da lu de gushì 大橹的故事	China	You Lei	Shanghai Animation Film Studio	Stop motion	Theatrical			
Davy Crockett on the Mississippi	United States; Australia	Charles A. Nicholas	Hanna-Barbera Australia	Traditional	Television special	Originally aired as the 23rd installment of the CBS animated anthology series Famous Classic Tales (1970–1984).	November 20, 1976	47 minutes
Donald Duck's Fun Festival	United States		Walt Disney Productions	Traditional	Theatrical; Compilation film	Film compiled from Disney theatrical animated shorts; originally released theatrically for overseas markets and never in the United States.		63 minutes
Everybody Rides the Carousel	United States	John Hubley	Hubley Studios	Traditional	Theatrical		September 10, 1976	72 minutes
The Four Secrets; Los cuatro secretos	Argentina	Simón Feldman	Producciones Cinematográficas H.L.F.	Traditional/Live action	Theatrical; Live-action animated film		December 8, 1976	70 minutes
From the Earth to the Moon	Australia	Richard Slapczynski	Air Programs International	Traditional	Television special	Originally aired as the 20th installment of the CBS animated anthology series Famous Classic Tales (1970–1984).	January 1, 1976	46 minutes
I, Tintin; Moi, Tintin	Belgium; France	Henri Roanne; Gérard Valet	Belvision Studios; Pierre Films; Rova	Traditional/Live action	Theatrical; Documentary film			51 minutes
Jinse de dayan 金色的大雁	China	Te Wei; Chen Zuwei	Shanghai Animation Film Studio	Cutout	Theatrical			
Master of the World	Australia	Leif Gram	Air Programs International	Traditional	Television special	Originally aired as the 22nd installment of the CBS animated anthology series Famous Classic Tales (1970–1984).	October 23, 1976	60 minutes
Mr. Rossi Looks for Happiness; Il Signor Rossi cerca la felicità	Italy; Germany	Bruno Bozzetto	Bruno Bozzetto Film; Hessischer Rundfunk (HR); Televisione Svizzera Italiana (TSI); Wagner-Hallig Film	Traditional	Theatrical		March 4, 1976	80 minutes
Mr. Rossi's Vacation; Le vacanze del signor Rossi	Italy	Bruno Bozzetto	Bruno Bozzetto Film; Wagner-Hallig Film	Traditional	Theatrical		October 1976	84 minutes
Off on a Comet	Australia	Richard Slapczynski	Air Programs International	Traditional	Television special	Originally aired as the 21st installment of the CBS animated anthology series Famous Classic Tales (1970–1984).	January 1, 1976	50 minutes
Once Upon a Girl	United States	Don Jurwich	Concelation a Girl, Inc. Tommy J. Productions	Traditional	Theatrical; Live-action animated film	Originally rated X, rating surrendered by Severin Films for unrated DVD release.	June 20, 1976	77 minutes
Puss 'n Boots Travels Around the World; Nagagutsu o Haita Neko: Hachijū Nichi-kan Sekaiisshū	Japan	Hiroshi Shidara	Toei Animation	Traditional	Theatrical	Second sequel to The Wonderful World of Puss 'n Boots (1969).	March 20, 1976	69 minutes
Robot Taekwon V 로보트 태권브이 (Roboteu Taegwon Beui)	South Korea	Kim Cheong-gi	Yoo Productions; Seoul Donghwa	Traditional	Theatrical		July 24, 1976	76 minutes
Robot Taekwon V: Space Mission 로보트 태권 V – 제2탄 우주작전 (Roboteu Taegwon Beui – Je2tan Ujujagjeon)	South Korea	Kim Cheong-gi	Yoo Productions	Traditional	Theatrical		December 13, 1976	75 minutes
Rudolph's Shiny New Year	United States; Japan	Jules Bass; Arthur Rankin Jr.	Rankin/Bass; Video Tokyo Production	Stop motion	Television special	Sequel to Rudolph the Red-Nosed Reindeer (1964).	December 10, 1976	50 minutes
The Smurfs and the Magic Flute; La flûte à six schtroumpfs (The Flute with Six Smurfs)	France; Belgium	Peyo; Jose Dutillieu; Eddie Lateste	Atlantic Releasing Corporation, Target International, Roehall	Traditional	Theatrical	The film was released in the United States on November 25, 1983, after The Smurfs gained popularity from the successful TV series in the U.S.	January 21, 1976	71 minutes
The Three Wise Men; Los Tres Reyes Magos	Mexico	Fernando Ruiz; Adolfo Torres Portillo	CFA-Ruiz; CINSA; Corporación Nacional Cinematográfica (CONACINE)	Traditional	Theatrical	First Mexican animated feature; produced in 1974, but left unreleased until two years later.	July 1, 1976	85 minutes
The Twelve Tasks of Asterix; Les Douze Travaux d'Astérix	France	René Goscinny; Albert Uderzo; Pierre Watrin	Studios Idéfix	Traditional	Theatrical	Third installment in the Asterix film series, and the first to have a completely original screenplay.	March 12, 1976	82 minutes

== See also ==
- List of animated television series of 1976
