= List of Chorlton and the Wheelies episodes =

The following is an episode list for the television series Chorlton and the Wheelies. The first episode originally aired in the United Kingdom and New Zealand on 27 September 1976, and the programme ran for three series over three years. The final episode aired on 18 December 1 978. 40 episodes were produced.

Chorlton and the Wheelies was an animated children's television series that followed the adventures of Chorlton, a happiness dragon, in Wheelie World.

== Episodes ==
=== Series overview ===
Season	Episodes	Originally aired
1	13	27 September 1976
2	13	26 September 1977
Specials	01	24 December 1977
3	13	26 August 1978

=== Series 1 (1976) ===
Episode #	Episode Title	Air date
1	"Happiness Is Hatched"	27 September 1976
2	"Happiness Is Dragon-Shaped"	4 October 1976
3	"Chorlton Says It With Flowers"	11 October 1976
4	"The Lost Wheelie"	18 October 1976
5	"Chorlton And The Crime Wave"	25 October 1976
6	"Chorlton Gets His Wheels"	1 November 1976
7	"The Great Drought"	8 November 1976
8	"The Wheel Hockey Derby"	15 November 1976
9	"Many Happy Returns"	22 November 1976
10	"The Dancing Lesson"	6 December 1976
11	"The Day Of The Grand Race"	13 December 1976
12	"When The Band Played On And On"	20 December 1976
13	"Chorlton's Gift Of Happiness"	27 December 1976

=== Series 2 (1977) ===
Episode #	Episode Title	Air date
1	"Up And Down Plants"	26 September 1977
2	"Toady Trouble"	3 October 1977
3	"Tyred Out"	10 October 1977
4	"Chorlton And The Silence Spell"	17 October 1977
5	"Chorlton And The Singing Stones"	25 October 1977
6	"Inside The Kettle"	31 October 1977
7	"Day Of The See-Through Chorlton"	7 November 1977
8	"Double Trouble"	14 November 1977
9	"Chorlton And The Keep-Fit Class"	21 November 1977
10	"Wishing Tree"	28 November 1977
11	"Take Your Partners"	5 December 1977
12	"Octoblob"	12 December 1977
13	"Chorlton and the Snow Dragon"	19 December 1977

=== Christmas Special (1977) ===
Episode #	Episode Title	Air date
1	"Chorlton and the Ice World"	24 December 1977

=== Series 3 (1978) ===
Episode #	Episode Title	Air date
1	"Fenella And The Face Fungus"	26 August 1978
2	"Spot The Happiness Dragon"	2 September 1978
3	"Queen Doris' Silver Jubilee"	9 September 1978
4	"Chorlton And The Spinning Spell"	16 September 1978
5	"The Day The Lights Went Out"	23 September 1978
6	"Free-Wheeling Fenella"	30 September 1978
7	"Hop, Skip And Crunch"	7 October 1978
8	"Hide And Shriek"	14 October 1978
9	"Octoblob At Twilight" (Halloween Episode)	21 October 1978
10	"Pablo's World"	28 October 1978
11	"Skateboard Special"	4 November 1978
12	"Some Like It Hot"	11 November 1978
13	"Royal Wheelie World Pipe Band" (Last Episode)	18 December 1978
