= Chorlton and the Wheelies =

British children's television series (1976–1978)

- Genre: Children's
- Created by: Brian Cosgrove; Mark Hall
- Written by: Jo Kemp; Brian Trueman
- Directed by: Chris Taylor
- Voices of: Joe Lynch
- Theme music composer: Joe Griffiths
- Composer: Joe Griffiths
- Country of origin: United Kingdom
- Original language: English
- No. of seasons: 3
- No. of episodes: 40 (list of episodes)

Production
- Executive producers: Brian Cosgrove; Mark Hall
- Running time: 11 minutes
- Production company: Cosgrove Hall Productions

Original release
- Network: ITV
- Release: 26 September 1976 – 17 December 1979

Chorlton and the Wheelies is a British animated children's television series that ran from 27 September 1976 until 17 December 1979 on the British television channel ITV. 40 episodes were produced. The show followed the adventures of Chorlton, an anthropomorphic "happiness dragon", in "Wheelie World" (where people moved on wheels instead of legs).

Chorlton and the Wheelies was created by Cosgrove Hall Productions for Thames Television and broadcast on the ITV network.

The eponymous lead character gets his name from the suburb of Manchester in which the Cosgrove Hall studio was based: the legend "Made in Chorlton-cum-Hardy" is found written on the inside of the egg from which he hatches in the very first episode of the series.

== Synopsis ==
The series takes place in "Wheelie World", which is inhabited principally by the "wheelies", a race of anthropomorphic creatures who locomote by means of wheels. They have three wheels each: two large ones at the front (resembling feet), and a smaller centred one at the back (resembling a tail). The wheels are replaceable, and suitable wheels grow on vegetation found in Wheelie World.

The wheelies are in conflict with Fenella the Kettle Witch, an evil witch who speaks in a very strong Welsh accent and lives in Wheelie World but separately from the wheelies, in Spout Hall, an oversized kettle. Fenella hates happiness, and uses her powers primarily to make the wheelies unhappy. She has magical capabilities, including a form of teleportation which is her main mode of transport, and enchanted assistants including a magic book called 'Claptrap Von Spilldebeans' (who helps concoct her spells) and O'Reilly the Telescope, which gives her advice on magic. Minions include spikers (sinister looking objects like conker shells with baleful eyes, which roll everywhere) and toadies (pointed toadstools with similar eyes, which travel by bobbing through the ground as though it were water and who speak with a Chinese accent).

The wheelies have adopted into their society a "happiness dragon", Chorlton, who appears in Wheelie World at the very beginning of the series, hatching out of an egg. Chorlton is perpetually good-natured and perpetually clueless. For example, he fails to perceive Fenella as a villain, and affectionately refers to her as a "little old lady". Nevertheless, his presence negates the unhappiness magic, so the wheelies treat him as a hero. Being "Made in Chorlton-cum-Hardy" (Greater Manchester) he has a strong Lancashire accent.

== Development ==
Plots are extremely simple, mainly revolve around Fenella's schemes to make the wheelies unhappy and Chorlton's accidental rectification of everything that goes wrong. Around these events, the characters' simple and exaggerated personalities are on show.

The idea of 'wheelies' came about after the difficulties of moving many different characters using stop-frame animation. Characters on wheels were easier to manipulate than those with legs that needed fractionally moving many times for each second of filming. Similarly, choosing teleportation as Fenella's principal means of transportation means that usually Chorlton is the only character whose walking needs to be animated.

The show was sold to numerous countries around the world.

== Characters ==
The characters include, amongst others:

- Chorlton the Happiness Dragon - where he goes, happiness follows. He thwarts Fenella's evil schemes by accident, and is always apologetic to her afterwards. His catchphrase at the end of every episode is "Bye bye, little old lady!" (addressed to Fenella). He does not understand that the witch is evil.
- Fenella Fellorick, the Kettle Witch - a Welsh witch who does not like anyone to enjoy themselves. She lives in a gigantic kettle called Spout Hall, along with her henchmen Claptrap and O'Reilly.
- Zoomer - a wheelie boy, notable for his speed of locomotion. He wears an old-fashioned flying cap and goggles.
- Jenny - a wheelie girl with ginger hair and freckles. She fancies Chorlton.
- King Otto and Queen Doris - The monarchy of Wheelieworld. Otto has a huge red nose and a bow tie, while Doris has purple hair and an enormous clown smile.
- The Minister of wheel estate - the political wheelie, who bears a striking resemblance to Harold Wilson, who had recently been Prime Minister of the UK. His real name is revealed to be Arthur in season 3.
- Claptrap von Spilldebeans - A German spellbook who often speaks in rhyme and comes up with Fenella's schemes.
- O'Reilly the one eyed telescope - An Irish telescope that Fenella stole from the end of Dún Laoghaire East pier.
- Clifford - A giant, Fenella's son and Quinine's nephew. He is so tall the only part of him that ever is in shot is his leg.
- Pablo Perdito - A world famous Latin American dancing duck.
- Floyd - The only toady to have pink spots rather than green (first called by name in the series two episode "Toady Trouble" - possible hidden reference to the band Pink Floyd).
- Quinine Fellorick the Pink Suit - Fenella's sister, who also does not like anyone to enjoy themselves.

Joe Lynch narrated the show as well as providing all the voices for the characters and the show's theme tune was written and sung by Joe Griffiths.

== Credits ==
- Narrator: Joe Lynch (UK version)
- Written by: Brian Trueman
- Music: Joe Griffiths
- Animation: Joe Dembinski, Jackie Cockle
- Props: Chris Walker
- Original Storyline: Jo Kemp
- Camera: Jim Noble
- Editing: Dave Street
- Executive Producer: John Hambley
- Produced by: Brian Cosgrove, Mark Hall
- Directed by: Chris Taylor
- Cosgrove-Hall Productions MCMLXXVI-MCMLXXIX
- Thames Colour Production
