= 1976 in film =

The year 1976 in film involved some significant events.

== Events ==
- January – Paramount Pictures sets up a separate motion picture division and names David V. Picker as president.
- March 22 – Filming begins on George Lucas' Star Wars science fiction film. In one of the most lucrative business decisions in film history, Lucas declines his directing fee of $500,000 in exchange for complete ownership of merchandising and sequel rights.
- April 1 – The Rocky Horror Picture Show is officially re-released as a midnight movie at the Waverly Theater (Now the IFC Center) in Greenwich Village in New York City, starting through the run and still being shown in there as of 2013 all around the world.
- April 9 – Alfred Hitchcock's last film, Family Plot, is released.
- August 11 – John Wayne appears in his final film, The Shootist.
- August 26 – Alan Ladd Jr. is promoted from head of worldwide production to president of 20th Century Fox's film division.
- November 15 – Michael Eisner is brought in as president and CEO of Paramount Pictures.
- November 21 – Rocky, the first in the film series opens. It becomes the highest-grossing film released in the year and goes on to win the Academy Award for Best Picture.
- December 5 – Bound for Glory debuts and is the first motion picture in which inventor/operator Garrett Brown used his new Steadicam for filming moving scenes, although its use had already been seen in Marathon Man and Rocky which were filmed later but released earlier.
- December 17 - King Kong opens to the year's highest opening weekend gross and overall box office success.

== Awards ==
Category/Organization	34th Golden Globe Awards January 29, 1977		30th BAFTA Awards March 24, 1977	49th Academy Awards March 28, 1977
Category/Organization	Drama	Musical or Comedy	30th BAFTA Awards March 24, 1977	49th Academy Awards March 28, 1977
Best Film	Rocky	A Star Is Born	One Flew Over the Cuckoo's Nest	Rocky
Best Director	Sidney Lumet; Network		Miloš Forman; One Flew Over the Cuckoo's Nest	John G. Avildsen; Rocky
Best Actor	Peter Finch; Network	Kris Kristofferson; A Star Is Born	Jack Nicholson; One Flew Over the Cuckoo's Nest	Peter Finch; Network
Best Actress	Faye Dunaway; Network	Barbra Streisand; A Star Is Born	Louise Fletcher; One Flew Over the Cuckoo's Nest	Faye Dunaway; Network
Best Supporting Actor	Laurence Olivier; Marathon Man		Brad Dourif; One Flew Over the Cuckoo's Nest	Jason Robards; All the President's Men
Best Supporting Actress	Katharine Ross; Voyage of the Damned		Jodie Foster; Taxi Driver and Bugsy Malone	Beatrice Straight; Network
Best Screenplay, Adapted	Paddy Chayefsky; Network		Alan Parker; Bugsy Malone	William Goldman; All the President's Men
Best Screenplay, Original	Paddy Chayefsky; Network		Alan Parker; Bugsy Malone	Paddy Chayefsky; Network
Best Original Score	Kenneth Ascher and Paul Williams; A Star Is Born		Bernard Herrmann; Taxi Driver	Jerry Goldsmith; The Omen; Leonard Rosenman; Bound for Glory
Best Original Song	"Evergreen"; A Star Is Born		N/A	"Evergreen"; A Star Is Born
Best Foreign Language Film	Face to Face		N/A	Black and White in Color

Palme d'Or (Cannes Film Festival):

Taxi Driver, directed by Martin Scorsese, United States

Golden Bear (Berlin Film Festival):

Buffalo Bill and the Indians, or Sitting Bull's History Lesson, directed by Robert Altman, United States

== Highest-grossing films (U.S.) ==
The top ten 1976 released films by box office gross in North America are as follows:

Highest-grossing films of 1976
Rank	Title	Distributor	Domestic rentals
1	Rocky	United Artists	$55,900,000
2	A Star Is Born	Warner Bros.	$37,100,000
3	King Kong	Paramount	$36,900,000
4	Silver Streak	20th Century Fox	$30,018,000
5	All the President's Men	Warner Bros.	$30,000,000
6	The Omen	20th Century Fox	$28,500,000
7	The Bad News Bears	Paramount	$24,800,000
8	The Enforcer	Warner Bros.	$24,000,000
9	In Search of Noah's Ark	Sunn Classic	$23,800,000
10	Midway	Universal	$21,610,435

== 1976 films ==
=== By country/region ===
- List of American films of 1976
- List of Argentine films of 1976
- List of Australian films of 1976
- List of Bangladeshi films of 1976
- List of British films of 1976
- List of Canadian films of 1976
- List of French films of 1976
- List of Hong Kong films of 1976
- List of Indian films of 1976
  - List of Hindi films of 1976
  - List of Kannada films of 1976
  - List of Malayalam films of 1976
  - List of Marathi films of 1976
  - List of Tamil films of 1976
  - List of Telugu films of 1976
- List of Japanese films of 1976
- List of Mexican films of 1976
- List of Pakistani films of 1976
- List of South Korean films of 1976
- List of Soviet films of 1976
- List of Spanish films of 1976

=== By genre/medium ===
- List of action films of 1976
- List of animated feature films of 1976
- List of avant-garde films of 1976
- List of comedy films of 1976
- List of drama films of 1976
- List of horror films of 1976
- List of science fiction films of 1976
- List of thriller films of 1976
- List of western films of 1976

== Births ==
- January 2 – Paz Vega, Spanish actress
- January 6
  - Johnny Yong Bosch, American actor, voice actor
  - Danny Pintauro, American actor
- January 8 - Jenny Lewis, American singer-songwriter, musician and actress
- January 13
  - Alice Winocour, French screenwriter and director
  - Michael Peña, American actor
- January 15 - Dorian Missick, American actor
- January 18 - Derek Richardson, American actor
- January 20 - Wayne Bastrup, American actor and musician
- January 21 – Lars Eidinger, German film, television and stage actor
- January 28 – Lee Ingleby, English film, television and stage actor
- January 31 - Paul Scheer, American actor, comedian
- February 2 - Lori Beth Denberg, American actress and comedian
- February 3
  - Isla Fisher, Australian actress
  - Tim Heidecker, American comedian, writer, director, actor and musician
- February 5
  - Abhishek Bachchan, Indian actor
  - Tony Jaa, Thai actor, martial artist, director and stuntman
- February 8 - Sharon Duncan-Brewster, British actress
- February 9 – Charlie Day, American actor, screenwriter, producer, comedian, director and musician
- February 10 – Keeley Hawes, English actress
- February 11 – Brice Beckham, American actor
- February 12 - Christopher Pettiet, American actor (d. 2000)
- February 14 – Erica Leerhsen, American actress
- February 23
  - Aaron Aziz, Singaporean actor, singer and film director
  - Kelly Macdonald, Scottish actress
- February 25 – Rashida Jones, American actress, director, writer, and producer
- February 28 - Ali Larter, American actress
- March 5 - Neil Jackson, English actor, musician and writer
- March 8 – Freddie Prinze Jr., American actor, voice actor, writer and producer
- March 13 – Danny Masterson, American actor and DJ
- March 14
  - Daniel Gillies, New Zealand-Canadian actor, producer, director and screenwriter
  - Corey Stoll, American actor
- March 16 – Paul Schneider, American actor
- March 19 - De'Aundre Bonds, American actor
- March 21 – Rachael MacFarlane, American voice actress, singer and writer
- March 22 – Reese Witherspoon, American actress and producer
- March 23
  - Michelle Monaghan, American actress
  - Keri Russell, American actress
- March 25 - Domenick Lombardozzi, American actor
- March 26 – Amy Smart, American actress
- March 27 - Craig Wayans, American writer, producer and actor
- March 30 - Jessica Cauffiel, American actress and singer
- April 1
  - Troy Baker, American voice actor
  - Evan Jones, American actor
  - David Oyelowo, English actor, producer, director
- April 5 – Sterling K. Brown, American actor
- April 6 - Candace Cameron Bure, American actress, producer, author, and talk show panelist
- April 13
  - Glenn Howerton, American actor, writer, producer
  - Jonathan Brandis, American actor (d. 2003)
- April 15 – Susan Ward, American actress and model
- April 16 – Lukas Haas, American actor
- April 17
  - Maïwenn, French actress and filmmaker
  - Monet Mazur, American actress
- April 18 – Melissa Joan Hart, American actress
- April 20 – Joey Lawrence, American actor
- April 23 – Gabriel Damon, American actor
- April 26
  - Elisabet Reinsalu, Estonian actress
  - Thurop Van Orman, American cartoonist, animator, voice actor, producer and director
- April 27 – Sally Hawkins, English actress
- May 1
  - Darius McCrary, American actor, rapper, singer and producer
  - Violante Placido, Italian actress and singer
- May 5
  - Dieter Brummer, Australian actor (d. 2021)
  - Sage Stallone, American actor (d. 2012)
- May 14 - Martine McCutcheon, English actress and singer
- May 22 – Külli Teetamm, Estonian actress
- May 25
  - Erinn Hayes, American actress and comedian
  - Cillian Murphy, Irish actor
  - Ethan Suplee, American film and television actor
  - J. Michael Tatum, American voice actor
- May 28 - Liam O'Brien, American voice actor, writer and director
- May 29 – Yûsuke Iseya, Japanese actor
- May 30 – Omri Katz, American retired actor
- May 31 – Colin Farrell, Irish actor
- June 4 - Damion Poitier, American actor and stuntman
- June 6 - Jonathan Nolan, British-American screenwriter, producer and director
- June 8
  - Eion Bailey, American actor
  - Elliot Graham, American editor and producer (d. 2026)
- June 10 - Simon Fenton, English actor
- June 17 - Scott Adkins, British actor, producer and martial artist
- June 18 - Jonathan Levine, American filmmaker
- June 19 - Ryan Hurst, American actor
- June 21 – Dan Scanlon, American animator, storyboard artist, director and screenwriter
- June 28 - Lorraine Stanley, English actress
- June 29
  - Omar Doom, American actor, musician and artist
  - Bret McKenzie, New Zealand musician, comedian and actor
- July 1 - Thomas Sadoski, American actor
- July 3 - Andrea Barber, American actress and comedian
- July 5
  - Jamie Elman, Canadian-American actor
  - Liberty Phoenix, American former actress
- July 6 - Bashir Salahuddin, American actor, writer and comedian
- July 7 - Hamish Linklater, American actor
- July 9
  - Krondon, American actor and rapper
  - Fred Savage, American actor
- July 12 - Anna Friel, English actress
- July 15
  - Gabriel Iglesias, American stand-up comedian and actor
  - Diane Kruger, German actress
- July 17 - Dagmara Dominczyk, Polish-American actress
- July 18 – Elsa Pataky, Spanish-Australian actress
- July 19
  - Benedict Cumberbatch, English actor
  - Vinessa Shaw, American actress and model
- July 24 - Grégory Gadebois, French actor
- July 31 – Mela Lee, American voice actress
- August 2 – Sam Worthington, Australian actor
- August 8 - Nigél Thatch, American actor
- August 9
  - Rhona Mitra, British actress
  - Audrey Tautou, French actress
- August 23 - Scott Caan, American actor, director and writer
- August 25 – Alexander Skarsgard, Swedish actor
- August 26 – Byron Lawson, Canadian actor
- August 27
  - Sarah Chalke, Canadian actress, model and voice artist
  - RonReaco Lee, American actor
- August 30 - Lillo Brancato, American actor
- September 2 - Tim Key, English actor and comedian
- September 3 – Vivek Oberoi, Indian actor
- September 5 – Carice van Houten, Dutch actress and singer
- September 6
  - Domenica Cameron-Scorsese, American actress
  - Robin Atkin Downes, English actor and voice actor
  - Naomie Harris, English actress
- September 7 - Oliver Hudson, American actor
- September 9
  - Emma de Caunes, French actress
  - Lúcia Moniz, Portuguese singer and actress
- September 13 - Colin Trevorrow, American filmmaker
- September 20
  - Jon Bernthal, American actor
  - Enuka Okuma, Canadian actress
- September 22 - Sala Baker, New Zealand actress and stuntman
- September 24
  - Ian Bohen, American actor
  - Matthew Gravelle, Welsh actor
- September 26 – Kersti Heinloo, Estonian actress
- October 3 – Seann William Scott, American actor, comedian and producer
- October 4 – Alicia Silverstone, American actress
- October 6 - Brett Gelman, American actor and comedian
- October 9
  - Sam Riegel, American voice actor, director and writer
  - Nick Swardson, American actor, stand-up comedian, screenwriter and producer
- October 11 - Emily Deschanel, American actress
- October 14 - Chang Chen, Taiwanese actor
- October 20 – Dan Fogler, American actor, comedian and writer
- October 21 – Andrew Scott, Irish actor
- October 23 – Ryan Reynolds, Canadian actor and film producer
- October 26 - Florence Kasumba, Ugandan-born German actress
- October 31 – Piper Perabo, American actress
- November 1 - Logan Marshall-Green, American actor and filmmaker
- November 5 - Sebastian Arcelus, American actor
- November 7 - Melyssa Ade, Canadian actress
- November 24
  - Coralie Fargeat, French film director and screenwriter
  - Hiroyuki Ikeuchi, Japanese actor
- November 28 - Ryan Kwanten, Australian actor and producer
- November 29
  - Chadwick Boseman, American actor and playwright (d. 2020)
  - Anna Faris, American actress, podcaster and writer
- December 1 - Dean O'Gorman, New Zealand actor
- December 5 - Amy Acker, American actress
- December 7 – Mark Duplass, American filmmaker, actor, writer, and musician
- December 8 – Dominic Monaghan, English actor
- December 23 - Kyle Kinane, American stand-up comedian and actor
- December 27 - Aaron Stanford, American actor
- December 28 - Joe Manganiello, American actor
- December 29
  - Dome Karukoski, Finnish director
  - Danny McBride, American actor, comedian and writer
- December 31 - Chris Terrio, American screenwriter and director

== Deaths ==
Month
Date
Name
Age
Country
Profession
Notable films
January
1
Walter Janssen
88
Germany
Actor
- The Great Longing
- Maskerade
12
Agatha Christie
85
UK
Writer
- Witness for the Prosecution
- Murder on the Orient Express
13
Margaret Leighton
53
UK
Actress
- The Go-Between
- The Best Man
18
Sonia Dresdel
66
UK
Actress
- This Was a Woman
- The Fallen Idol
23
Paul Dupuis
62
France
Actor
- Against the Wind
- Madness of the Heart
23
Paul Robeson
77
US
Actor, Singer
- Show Boat
- The Proud Valley
29
Michael Gwynn
59
UK
Actor
- Cleopatra
- Jason and the Argonauts
February
4
Roger Livesey
69
UK
Actor
- The Entertainer
- The Life and Death of Colonel Blimp
11
Lee J. Cobb
64
US
Actor
- On the Waterfront
- The Exorcist
11
John Twist
77
US
Screenwriter
- King Richard and the Crusaders
- Annie Oakley
12
Sal Mineo
37
US
Actor
- Rebel Without a Cause
- Exodus
13
Lily Pons
77
France
Singer, Actress
- I Dream Too Much
- Hitting a New High
13
John Lounsbery
64
US
Animator
- Dumbo
- Lady and the Tramp
15
Maria Corda
77
Hungary
Actress
- White Rose
- The Private Life of Helen of Troy
16
Campbell Singer
66
UK
Actor
- The Square Peg
- The Hands of Orlac
24
Peter Madden
71
UK
Actor
- From Russia with Love
- Doctor Zhivago

26
Frieda Inescort
75
UK
Actress
- A Place in the Sun
- The Letter
March
3
Doris Hill
70
US
Actress
- Sons of the Saddle
- Men Are Like That
5
Charles Lederer
69
US
Screenwriter
- His Girl Friday
- Ocean's 11
14
Busby Berkeley
80
US
Director, Choreographer
- 42nd Street
- Hollywood Hotel
17
Luchino Visconti
69
Italy
Director, Writer
- The Leopard
- Death in Venice
20
Michael Goodliffe
61
UK
Actor
- Cromwell
- Jigsaw
28
Richard Arlen
76
US
Actor
- Wings
- Wildcat
April
2
Ray Teal
74
US
Actor
- Judgment at Nuremberg
- Ace in the Hole
4
George Pastell
53
Cyprus
Actor
- From Russia with Love
- The Magus
5
Howard Hughes
70
US
Director, Producer
- Hell's Angels
- The Outlaw
5
Robert Lord
75
US
Screenwriter, Producer
- One Way Passage
- 20,000 Years in Sing Sing
11
Liam Dunn
59
US
Actor
- Blazing Saddles
- Young Frankenstein
12
Paul Ford
74
US
Actor
- Advise & Consent
- The Music Man
21
Léonide Moguy
75
Russia
Director, Writer
- Paris After Dark
- Action in Arabia
25
Carol Reed
69
UK
Director, Writer
- OIiver!
- The Third Man
26
Neil McCallum
46
Canada
Actor
- The Longest Day
- Dr. Terror's House of Horrors
26
Sid James
62
UK
Actor
- The Lavender Hill Mob
- Trapeze
29
Thelma Connell
63
UK
Film Editor
- Alfie
- The Deadly Affair
May
3
David Bruce
62
US
Actor
- Susie Steps Out
- Lady on a Train
7
Alan Baxter
67
US
Actor
- Saboteur
- The Set-Up
27
Hilde Hildebrand
78
Germany
Actress
- Victor and Victoria
- Little Dorrit
27
Ruth McDevitt
80
US
Actress
- The Parent Trap
- The Birds
June
5
Violet Wilkey
73
US
Actress
- The Birth of a Nation
- The Burned Hand
6
Victor Varconi
85
Hungary
Actor
- The King of Kings
- The Sea Hawk
9
Sybil Thorndike
93
UK
Actress
- The Magic Box
- Melba
10
Adolph Zukor
103
US
Producer, Studio Executive
- Wings
- Shanghai Express
25
Johnny Mercer
66
US
Songwriter
- The Harvey Girls
- Darling Lili
28
Stanley Baker
48
UK
Actor
- The Guns of Navarone
- Helen of Troy
July
2
Frances Howard
73
US
Actress
- The Shock Punch
- The Swan
7
Norman Foster
72
US
Actor, Director
- Pilgrimage
- State Fair
12
James Wong Howe
76
China
Cinematographer
- The Rose Tattoo
- Hud
17
Rina Morelli
67
Italy
Actress
- The Leopard
- Senso
28
Lucie Mannheim
77
Germany
Actress
- The 39 Steps
- The High Command
August
2
Fritz Lang
85
Germany
Director, Writer
- Metropolis
- The Big Heat
6
William Mervyn
64
UK
Actor
- The Ruling Class
- The Long Arm
10
Ray Corrigan
74
US
Actor
- The Three Mesquiteers
- Range Busters
17
William Redfield
49
US
Actor
- One Flew Over the Cuckoo's Nest
- Death Wish
17
Murvyn Vye
60
US
Actor
- A Connecticut Yankee in King Arthur's Court
- Al Capone
18
Luigi Serventi
91
Italy
Actor
- A Woman's Story
- The Story of a Poor Young Man
28
Alastair Sim
75
UK
Actor
- The Green Man
- Scrooge
September
10
Dalton Trumbo
70
US
Screenwriter
- Spartacus
- Roman Holiday
30
Paul Dehn
63
UK
Screenwriter
- Goldfinger
- Murder on the Orient Express
October
5
Barbara Nichols
47
US
Actress
- Sweet Smell of Success
- The Naked and the Dead
14
Edith Evans
88
UK
Actress
- Tom Jones
- The Nun's Story
November
3
Ramsay Hill
86
US
Actor, Technical Advisor
- The Crusades
- One Hundred and One Dalmatians
15
Jean Gabin
72
France
Actor
- La Grande Illusion
- Port of Shadows
22
Rupert Davies
60
UK
Actor
- Waterloo
- The Criminal
28
Rosalind Russell
69
US
Actress
- His Girl Friday
- Auntie Mame
29
Godfrey Cambridge
43
US
Actor
- Cotton Comes to Harlem
- The President's Analyst
December
3
Mary Nash
92
US
Actress
- The Philadelphia Story
- The Human Comedy
8
Cathy Downs
50
US
Actress
- My Darling Clementine
- The Dark Corner
12
Jack Cassidy
49
US
Actor
- Bunny O'Hare
- The Eiger Sanction
20
Walter Fitzgerald
80
UK
Actor
- The Fallen Idol
- Man in the Sky

== Film debuts ==
- Diego Abatantuono – Young, Violent, Dangerous
- Victoria Abril – Robin and Marian
- Shohreh Aghdashloo – The Chess Game of the Wind
- Dan Aykroyd – Love at First Sight
- Tony Barry – Break of Day
- Albert Brooks – Taxi Driver
- Dean Cain – Elmer
- Nicholas Campbell – The Omen
- Michael Cavanaugh – The Enforcer
- Chow Yun-fat – Tou tai ren
- Cam Clarke – Baker's Hawk
- James Cromwell – Murder by Death
- Ron Dean – The Last Affair
- Michael Dorn – Rocky
- Bill Duke – Car Wash
- Joe Flaherty – Tunnel Vision
- Paul Freeman – Whose Child Am I?
- Pascal Greggory – Docteur Françoise Gailland
- Richard Griffiths – It Shouldn't Happen to a Vet
- Mariel Hemingway – Lipstick
- Ernie Hudson – Leadbelly
- Amy Irving – Carrie
- Michael Kamen (film composer) – The Next Man
- Alice Krige – Vergeet My Nie
- Jessica Lange – King Kong
- Jennifer Jason Leigh – The Spy Who Never Was
- James Lew – The Killing of a Chinese Bookie
- Delroy Lindo – Find the Lady
- Mark Margolis – The Opening of Misty Beethoven
- Marc McClure – Freaky Friday
- Edie McClurg – Carrie
- Sam McMurray – The Front
- Glenn Morshower – Drive-In
- Bill Murray – Next Stop, Greenwich Village
- Lena Olin – Face to Face
- Holmes Osborne – The Student Body
- Stuart Pankin – Next Stop, Greenwich Village
- Frank Pesce – Rocky
- Tim Pigott-Smith – Aces High
- Mary Kay Place – Bound for Glory
- Jonathan Pryce – Voyage of the Damned
- John Ratzenberger – The Ritz
- James Rebhorn – The Yum-Yum Girls
- Isabella Rossellini – A Matter of Time
- Cecilia Roth – No toquen a la nena
- Deep Roy – The Pink Panther Strikes Again
- Mercedes Ruehl – Dona Flor and Her Two Husbands
- Theresa Russell – The Last Tycoon
- Helen Shaver – Shoot
- Brooke Shields – Alice, Sweet Alice
- Ron Silver – Tunnel Vision
- P.J. Soles – Carrie
- Carol Sutton – Sounder, Part 2
- Holland Taylor – The Next Man
- Tim Thomerson – Car Wash
- Charlene Tilton – Freaky Friday
- Ian Tracey – The Keeper
- Frank Vincent – The Death Collector
- John Waters (actor) – End Play
- Tom Wilkinson – The Shadow Line
- Debra Winger – Slumber Party '57
- Tom Wright – Tomcats
- Keone Young – Baby Blue Marine
