= The Railway Owner =

- Directed by: Eugenio Perego
- Written by: Georges Ohnet (novel); Giuseppe Maria Viti
- Starring: Pina Menichelli; Luigi Serventi; Maria Caserini; Amleto Novelli
- Cinematography: Antonio Cufaro
- Production company: Itala Film
- Distributed by: UCI
- Release date: 25 February 1919
- Running time: 68 minutes
- Country: Italy
- Languages: Silent; Italian intertitles

The Railway Owner (Italian title:Il padrone delle ferriere) is a 1919 Italian silent drama film directed by Eugenio Perego and starring Luigi Serventi, Maria Caserini and Amleto Novelli. It is based on Georges Ohnet's novel Le Maître de Forges.

== Cast ==
- Maria Caserini as Marchesa di Beaulieu
- Myriam De Gaudi as Sig.na Derblay
- Isabel De Lizaso
- Pina Menichelli as Clara de Beaulieu
- Lina Millefleurs as Athenaide Moulinet
- Amleto Novelli as Filippo Derblay
- Luigi Serventi as Duca di Bligny

== Bibliography ==
- Angela Dalle Vacche. Diva: Defiance and Passion in Early Italian Cinema. University of Texas Press, 2008.
