= Tigre reale =

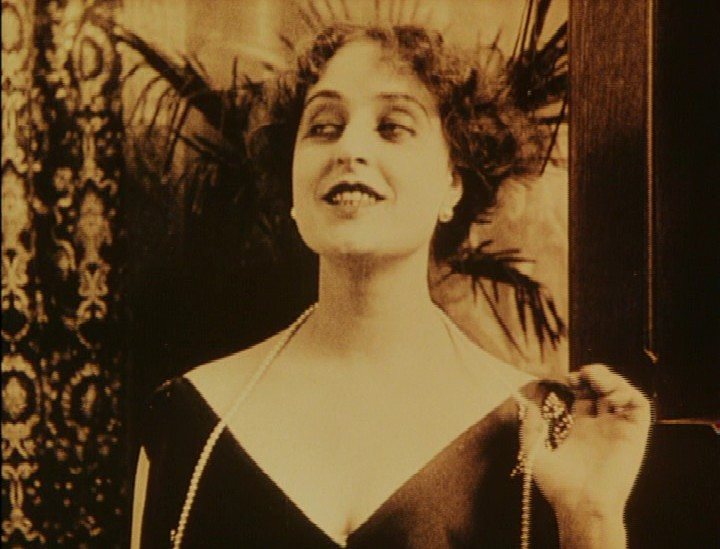
- Pina Menichelli as Contessa Natka
- Directed by: Giovanni Pastrone
- Written by: Giovanni Verga
- Based on: Tigre reale by Giovanni Verga
- Cinematography: Segundo de Chomón, Giovanni Tomatis
- Production company: Itala Film
- Release date: November 9, 1916
- Running time: 80 minutes
- Country: Italy
- Languages: Silent film with Italian intertitles

Tigre reale (The royal tigress) is a 1916 silent film directed by Giovanni Pastrone under the name Piero Fosco, adapting the eponymous 1875 novel by Giovanni Verga.

== Plot ==
Giorgio La Ferlita, Italian diplomat in Paris, falls in love during a reception with the Russian countess Natka, who is told to have led to death her former lover.

Once they have become lovers, she tells him about her past. She was unhappily married, and fell in love with another man named Dolski. When her husband discovered their affair, he had his rival confined in Siberia. Natka followed Dolski in Siberia, but when she finally found him, she discovered that he was with another woman. She ran away and refused to see him any more. Desperate, he committed suicide in front of her door.

After telling Ferlita her story, the countess dismisses him and disappears. After searching in vain during a few months, the diplomat decides to marry the rich Erminia. During his engagement party, he receives a letter from Natka, asking him to join her at a hotel. He leaves the party and comes to her room to find that she has taken a poison and is shaken by convulsions. A short-circuit sets the hotel on fire and her husband, mad with jealousy, locks them in the room. They manage to escape by jumping out of the window while her husband is killed in the fire.

== Cast ==
- Pina Menichelli: Contessa Natka
- Alberto Nepoti: Giorgio La Ferlita
- Febo Mari: Dolski
- Valentina Frascaroli: Erminia
- Ernesto Vaser: il droghiere

== Production ==
The film was produced by Itala Film, the company created by Carlo Rossi and Giovanni Pastrone, alias Piero Fosco.

== Critical reception ==
According to Eugenia Paulicelli, Pina Menichelli in Tigre Reale "is the sex symbol of Italian divas (...) and epitomizes what Fuchs has identified as the notion of appearing naked in full dress. (...) In a magisterial scene, (...) she devours a bouquet of roses, putting them in her mouth and eating them a scene that has overly sexual overtones." Salvador Dali was touched by Menichelli's performance and said "In those days characterized by such a violent eroticism, palms and magnolias were bitten off and devoured by these women." Catherine Ramsey-Portolano considers that Tigre Reale enforces "the role of the female character as representative of power by avoiding the association of the diva with notions of wrongdoing, accomplished through the sublimation of her responsibility and guilt into illness and suffering."

IMDb

- Italy : 9 November 1916
- Spain : 15 December 1916
- Portugal: 12 February 1919
- Japan : April 1919

== Bibliography ==
- V. Attolini - Storia del cinema letterario in cento film - Recco, Le Mani editore, ISBN 8880121030. (in Italian)
