= Férat =

Férat (English: /fɛˈrɑː/, French: [feʁa]) is a French surname. Notable people with the surname include:

- Françoise Férat (born 1949), French politician
- Jules Férat (1829–1906), French artist

== See also ==
- Madeleine Férat
