= Maciste the Athlete =

- Directed by: Vincenzo Denizot; Giovanni Pastrone
- Starring: Bartolomeo Pagano
- Production company: Itala Film
- Distributed by: Itala Film
- Release date: March 1918
- Country: Italy
- Languages: Silent; Italian intertitles

Maciste the Athlete (Italian: Maciste atleta) is a 1918 Italian silent film directed by Vincenzo Denizot and Giovanni Pastrone and starring Bartolomeo Pagano. It is part of the Maciste series.

== Cast ==
- Bartolomeo Pagano as Maciste
- Italia Almirante-Manzini
- Ruggero Capodaglio
- Giulio Andreotti

== Bibliography ==
- Jacqueline Reich. The Maciste Films of Italian Silent Cinema. Indiana University Press, 2015.
