= Leda Gys =

Italian actress (1892–1957)

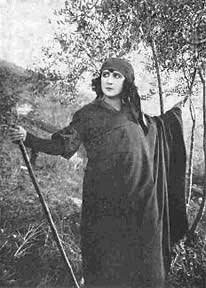
- Born: Giselda Lombardi; 10 March 1892; Rome, Lazio, Italy
- Died: 2 October 1957 (aged 65); Rome, Lazio, Italy
- Occupation: Actress
- Years active: 1913–1929 (film)

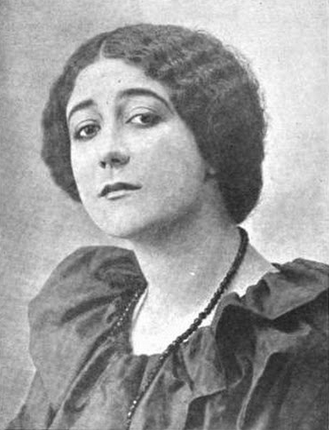
Leda Gys, from a 1917 publication.

Giselda Lombardi, better known by her screen name Leda Gys (10 March 1892 – 2 October 1957), was an Italian film actress of the silent era. The poet Carlo Alberto Salustri gave the aspiring actress her new name and introduced her to the film business in 1913. Her breakthrough role came in the epic Christus, which was shot in Palestine and Egypt. She then married the producer Gustavo Lombardo and worked for his Naples-based Lombardo Films, generally appearing in comedies that were often directed by Eugenio Perego.

== Selected filmography ==
- Pierrot the Prodigal (1914)
- The Wedding March (1915)
- Christus (1916)
- Naples is a Song (1927)

== Bibliography ==
- Abel, Richard. Encyclopedia of Early Cinema. Taylor & Francis, 2005.
