= Maddalena Ferat =

1920 film

- Directed by: Febo Mari; Roberto Roberti
- Written by: Vittorio Bianchi; Émile Zola (novel)
- Starring: Francesca Bertini
- Production companies: Bertini Film; Caesar Film
- Distributed by: Caesar Film
- Release date: December 1920
- Country: Italy
- Languages: Silent; Italian intertitles

Maddalena Ferat is a 1920 Italian silent film directed by Febo Mari and Roberto Roberti and starring Francesca Bertini. It is an adaptation of Émile Zola's 1868 novel Madeleine Férat.

== Cast ==
- Francesca Bertini
- Giorgio Bonaiti
- Achille De Riso
- Giovanni Gizzi
- Mario Parpagnoli
- Giuseppe Pierozzi
- Bianca Renieri
- Antonietta Zanone

== Bibliography ==
- Anna Gural & Robert Singer. Zola and Film: Essays in the Art of Adaptation. McFarland, 2005.
