= The Fall of Troy (film) =

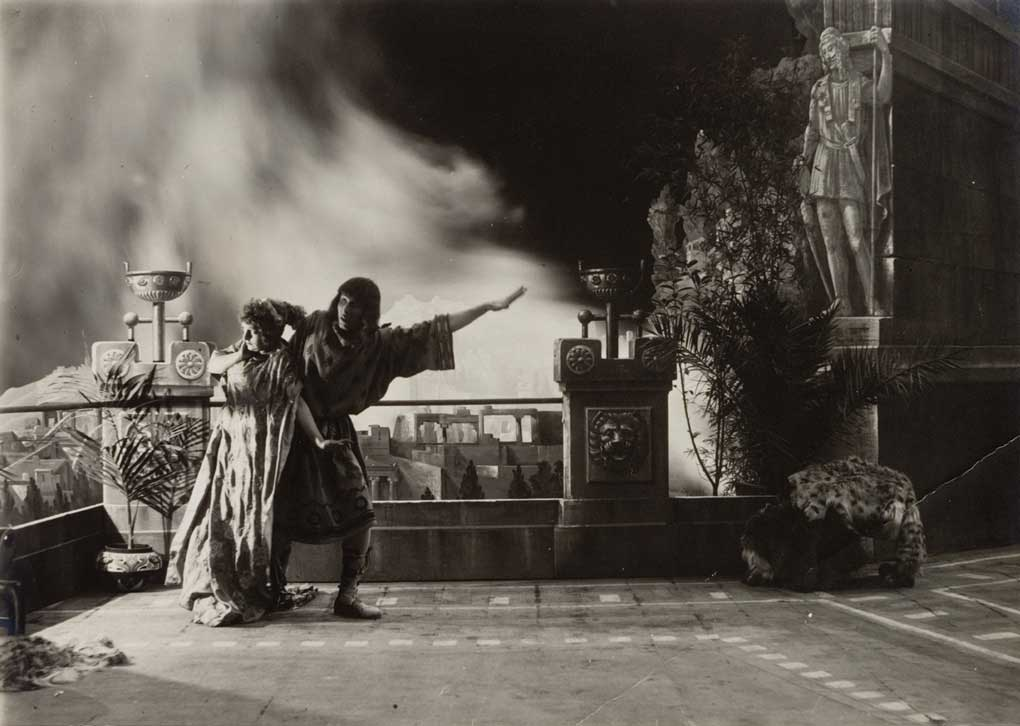
- Directed by: Giovanni Pastrone; Luigi Romano Borgnetto
- Based on: the Iliad by Homer
- Starring: Giovanni Casaleggio
- Production company: Itala Film
- Release date: 8 April 1911
- Running time: 31 min
- Country: Italy
- Language: silent

The Fall of Troy (Italian: La caduta di Troia) is a 1911 Italian silent short film directed by Giovanni Pastrone and Luigi Romano Borgnetto. It is the first known cinematographic adaptation of Homer's epic poem, the Iliad.

== Plot ==
King Menelaus of Sparta temporarily departs from his residence, leaving Queen Helen, his wife, without him. Paris of Troy, the son of King Priam of Troy, is the ambassador of Menelaus' court. When Paris arrives in Sparta, he, with the help of Aphrodite, the Goddess of Love, puts a love spell on Helen and, through divine teleportation, brings her to Troy where the two fall in love. Menelaus’ servant sees what has happened and reports the news to him. Devastated, the king of Sparta seeks revenge by declaring war on Troy. The Greeks attempt to siege the city walls of Troy, but fail. The Greeks then place a huge wooden Trojan horse with Greek warriors hidden inside under the walls of Troy, pretending to be dedicated to the Gods and ending the war. Falling for the trap, the Trojans break down the city walls to bring the wooden horse inside. A Greek spy reports the success of the trap back to Menelaus, and when no one is around, the Greek warriors exit the belly of the wooden horse to set fire to the city. With the city in chaos and the walls in shambles, the Greeks successfully laid siege to Troy and kill Paris at the end of the film.

== Production ==
As some advertising posters of the time testify, the film enjoyed international promotion.

== Cast ==
- Luigi Romano Borgnetto
- Giovanni Casaleggio
- Madame Davesnes
- Emilio Gallo Olga
- Giannini Novelli
- Giulio Vinà

== Promotion ==
Over 800 actors were involved in the filming for what was defined as the most ambitious project that no one had yet attempted in the world of cinema.

== Distribution ==
The film has been distributed since 1911 and is also known under the following titles:

- Brazil - ( A Queda de Tróia )
- Denmark - ( Trojas Fald )
- Norway - ( Trojas Fald )
- Finland - ( Trojan kukistus )
- France - ( La chûte de Troie )
- Netherlands - ( De val van Troje )
- Spain - ( La caida de Troya )
- Hungary - ( Trója eleste )

== Reception ==
600 meters long and projected without interruption in half an hour of show, The Fall of Troy did not take too long to be appreciated, especially at international level. The success achieved by the film, in fact, was crucial in bringing Italian Film to international prominence. In Italy, however, it did not receive any particular acclaim, but in the rest of Europe and in the United States it was received with great enthusiasm. The Fall of Troy made foreign audiences aware of and appreciate the exploits of the nascent Italian cinema.

The success seen by the film in the USA also allowed for the opening of a branch of Itala Films in New York in 1913.

=== Criticism ===
A critic of the New York Dramatic Mirror in April 1911 wrote: "this spectacular and very interesting film demonstrates, from the dramatic point of view, to what heights the art of cinema can reach. The sets embrace a real city and throughout the film an enchanting depth of perspective is maintained, through which an entire army of citizens and soldiers can be seen swarming in dense ranks. In the scenes of the destruction of Troy, one realizes that he is facing an incomparable production of great beauty and multiple artistic merits." The Moving Picture World (another New York newspaper) also wrote: "The question that is heard everywhere: Have you seen The Fall of Troy? gives this great and spectacular production the seal of the film of the week."
