= Madeleine Férat =

1868 novel by Émile Zola

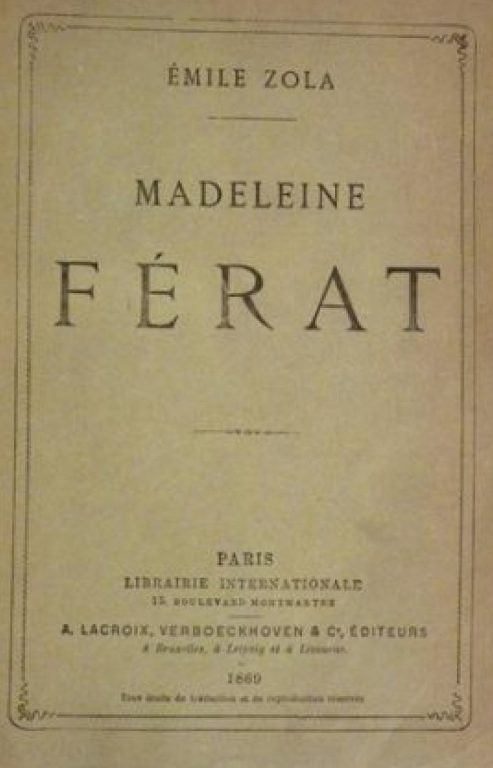
- Author: Émile Zola
- Original title: Shame (La Honte)
- Translator: Alec Brown
- Language: French
- Publisher: Albert Lacroix Elek Books
- Publication date: 1868
- Publication place: France
- English publication date: 1957
- Media type: Print
- Pages: 254
- Preceded by: Thérèse Raquin
- Followed by: Les Rougon-Macquart

Madeleine Férat is an 1868 novel by the French writer Émile Zola. It was his fourth novel, written immediately after Thérèse Raquin, which had been his first commercial and artistic success.

As was common with Zola novels, Madeleine Férat appeared initially in serial form (in L'Evénement Illustrée, from September 2 to October 20, 1868) under the title La Honte (The Shame/Disgrace). It was then published by Albert Lacroix as a single volume under its present title, and with a dedication to the painter Manet.

Madeleine Férat is a novelistic adaptation of an 1865 play by Zola that had not been accepted for production. The story deals with a beautiful woman in love with her husband Guillaume, but she is also still hopelessly and obsessively attracted to her former lover Jacques. This obsession leads to the destruction of Madeleine's marriage, and eventually drives her to suicide, while her husband, for his part, goes insane.

== Plot summary ==
Madeleine Férat's father, after making his fortune, ruins himself in risky speculations. He decides to go to America to rebuild his fortune, but his boat is shipwrecked. Before embarking, he had bequeathed what remained of his wealth to his daughter Madeleine. The guardian to whom he entrusted her offers to marry her; when she refuses, he tries to rape her. She manages to flee, and lives on the dwindling income left to her by her father. Shortly afterward she meets Jacques, a surgeon, and they become lovers. But then he abandons her to go on a mission to Cochinchina.

Next, she meets Guillaume de Viargues. He is the son of a Norman nobleman whose life was devoted to the study of chemistry in the solitude of his castle, La Noiraude. Guillaume's mother is married to a local notary who fell in love with the Count of Viargues before tiring of him and returning to her husband. Guillaume grew up alone in the family castle. His only company was an aged servant, nearly a hundred years old, obsessed with religion. Guillaume is sent to boarding school and is persecuted by the other children, who call him the bastard. His misery at school persists until a student arrives who takes Guillaume under his protection; it is none other than Jacques, who will become Madeleine's first lover.

During their courtship, Guillaume guesses that Madeleine had a romantic past, but he prefers to know nothing about it. It is she who discovers that Guillaume's friend, the one whom Guillaume considers his brother, is her former lover. Soon after this revelation, she hears of Jacques' death in a boating accident. Guillaume's father dies and leaves his fortune to his son. Guillaume learns from the servant in the castle that his father in fact committed suicide with the only products of his chemistry research: poison. The servant regards the suicide as punishment for the Count's past faults.

Guillaume and Madeleine settle into their life in the castle. She opts to not say anything to him about Jacques. She gives birth to a daughter. Guillaume learns one day that Jacques did not die in the sinking of his boat. He returns with his boyhood friend to the castle. Madeleine manages to hide from Jacques, then tells her husband that she and Jacques knew each other. Horrified, Guillaume chooses to flee with his wife under the pretext of an obligation. They go to an inn and try to forget the past, but fate makes them choose a place where Madeleine and Jacques loved each other, which Madeleine discovers in the room. What's more, Jacques himself is at the same inn that night, and manages to speak to Madeleine. He imagines that Madeleine has brought one of her new lovers into the room where she and he had stayed together. She does not tell him she is now Guillaume's wife. They intend to return to the castle in the hope of reaching an understanding concerning their daughter. But Guillaume discovers a resemblance between his daughter and Jacques, which causes him to reject her. The servant continues to persecute them with her sermons. Madeleine and Guillaume prepare to flee to Paris to distract themselves in social life. But they learn that Jacques is attempting to see them again and they decide to return to the castle. Shortly before their return, they learn that their daughter has suffered a smallpox relapse. Madeleine uses the excuse of an oversight to postpone her return. She actually wants to see Jacques again, to tell him that she is married to Guillaume and that Jacques must stay away.

But she cannot help herself; she naturally falls back into Jacques' arms. When she returns to La Noiraude, it is to learn of the death of her daughter. She then goes to the former laboratory of the Count of Viargues, where the poisons with which he committed suicide remain. Her husband tries to prevent her from committing suicide, but when she reveals to him her desperate love for Jacques, Guillaume lets her do it. In a fit of madness, as if delivered, he dances on her corpse, under the eyes of the old servant who sees there the fulfillment of her prophecies: “God has not forgiven!"

== Analysis ==
Zola sets out his vision of heredity which will be developed later in Les Rougon-Macquart.

He introduces as a tragic spring the theory, already contested in his time, of impregnation, put forward by Jules Michelet in L'Amour (1859) and La Femme (1860), and by Doctor Prosper Lucas in the Treatise on Natural Heredity (1847–1850). The theory stated that a woman would keep the indelible imprint of the man who took her virginity: Jacques, "while he matured her virginity, while he made it his for life, he released from the virgin a woman, marked this woman with his footprint."

Madeleine was able to imprint on her first lover in such a way that her daughter resembled him more than her real father. This impregnation inevitably brings her back to her first lover, whatever she does. This fatalism echoes in a disturbing way that which the servant, the old Protestant Cévennes peasant woman, supports with her religious obsessions.

== Translations ==
=== Expurgated ===
- Madeleine Férat (1888) - anonymous translation for H. Vizetelly, Vizetelly & Co.

=== Unexpurgated ===
1. Shame (1954) by Lee Marcourt (Ace Books)
2. Madeleine Férat (1957) by Alec Brown (Elek Books). Republished as Fatal Intimacy (1960)

== Play Version ==
The novel's plot was initially written by Zola as a three-act play in 1865, under the title Madeleine Férat. Unable to find a theater director willing to stage the play, Zola converted it into a novel. Later in 1889, he entrusted the original 1865 play to André Antoine, who performed it without any modifications using his Théâtre-Libre troupe. The text of the play was first published in 1927 by Maurice Le Blond, a writer and son-in-law of Zola, in the Complete Works (Théâtre I, Paris, François Bernouard). The play has never been translated into English.

== Adaptation ==
In 1920, Madeleine Férat was turned into an Italian silent film, Maddalena Ferat, directed by Roberto Roberti and Febo Mari, and starring Francesca Bertini.

== Bibliography ==
- Anna Gural & Robert Singer. Zola and Film: Essays in the Art of Adaptation. McFarland, 2005.
