= A Woman's Story =

1920 film

- Italian film poster
- Italian: La storia di una donna
- Directed by: Eugenio Perego
- Written by: Amleto Palermi
- Starring: Pina Menichelli; Luigi Serventi; Livio Pavanelli
- Cinematography: Antonio Cufaro
- Production company: Rinascimento Film
- Distributed by: UCI
- Release date: May 1920
- Running time: 73 minutes
- Country: Italy
- Languages: Silent; Italian intertitles

A Woman's Story or The Story of One Woman (Italian: La storia di una donna) is a 1920 Italian silent drama film directed by Eugenio Perego and starring Pina Menichelli, Luigi Serventi and Livio Pavanelli. A single mother has to work as a high-class prostitute.

== Cast ==
- Pina Menichelli as Beatrice
- Luigi Serventi as Paolo
- Livio Pavanelli as Fabiano
