= The Fire (1916 film) =

- Directed by: Giovanni Pastrone
- Release date: 7 April 1916
- Running time: 45min
- Country: Italy

The Fire (Italian: Il fuoco) is a 1916 Italian silent film directed by Giovanni Pastrone. It is loosely based on the novel The Flame by Gabriele D'Annunzio.

== Cast ==
- Pina Menichelli - Poet
- Febo Mari - il pittore Mario Alberti
- Felice Minotti
