= Eugenio Perego =

Italian film director

- Born: 28 August 1876; Milan, Lombardy, Italy
- Died: 26 February 1944 (aged 67); Rome, Lazio, Italy
- Occupation: Director
- Years active: 1913–1929 (film)

Eugenio Perego (1876–1944) was an Italian film director of the silent era. During the 1920s he directed a number of comedy films starring Leda Gys.

== Selected filmography ==
- The Two Sergeants (1913)
- The Railway Owner (1919)
- A Woman's Story (1920)
- Chief Saetta (1924)
- Naples is a Song (1927)

== Bibliography ==
- Abel, Richard. Encyclopedia of Early Cinema. Taylor & Francis, 2005.
