= Pierrot the Prodigal =

- Directed by: Baldassarre Negroni
- Written by: Fernand Beissier (play)
- Starring: Francesca Bertini; Leda Gys; Emilio Ghione
- Cinematography: Giorgio Ricci
- Music by: Mario Costa
- Production company: Celio Film
- Distributed by: Celio Film
- Release date: 11 February 1914
- Country: Italy
- Languages: Silent; Italian intertitles

Pierrot the Prodigal (French: Histoire d'un Pierrot) is a 1914 Italian silent film directed by Baldassarre Negroni and starring Francesca Bertini, Leda Gys and Emilio Ghione.

== Cast ==
- Francesca Bertini as Pierrot
- Leda Gys as Louisette
- Emilio Ghione as Pochinet
- Elvira Radaelli as Fifine
- Amedeo Ciaffi as Julot
- Ninne as A Child

== Bibliography ==
- Moliterno, Gino. The A to Z of Italian Cinema. Scarecrow Press, 2009.
