= The Story of a Poor Young Man (1920 film) =

1920 film directed by Amleto Palermi

- Directed by: Amleto Palermi
- Written by: Octave Feuillet (novel); Amleto Palermi
- Starring: Luigi Serventi; Pina Menichelli; Antonio Gandusio
- Cinematography: Antonio Cufaro
- Production company: Rinascimento Film
- Distributed by: UCI
- Release date: October 1920
- Running time: 86 minutes
- Country: Italy
- Languages: Silent; Italian intertitles

The Story of a Poor Young Man (Italian: Il romanzo di un giovane povero) is a 1920 Italian silent drama film directed by Amleto Palermi and starring Luigi Serventi, Pina Menichelli and Antonio Gandusio. It was one of numerous film adaptations of Octave Feuillet's novel of the same name.

== Cast ==
- Luigi Serventi as Massimo
- Pina Menichelli as Margherita
- Gemma De Sanctis
- Antonio Gandusio
- Giuseppe Piemontesi
- Gustavo Salvini

== Bibliography ==
- Angela Dalle Vacche. Diva: Defiance and Passion in Early Italian Cinema. University of Texas Press, 2008.
