= Giovanni Pastrone =

Italian filmmaker (1883–1959)

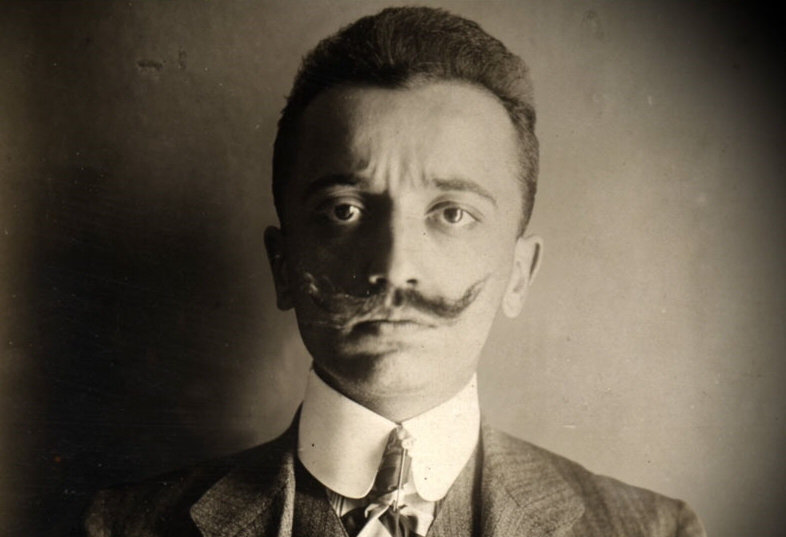
- Giovanni Pastrone in the 1910s
- Born: 13 September 1883; Montechiaro d'Asti, Piedmont, Italy
- Died: 27 June 1959 (aged 75); Turin, Piedmont, Italy
- Resting place: Monumental Cemetery of Turin
- Other name: Piero Fosco
- Occupations: Film director; screenwriter; actor; technician
- Years active: 1908-1923
- Notable work: The Fall of Troy; Cabiria
- Spouse: Anna Maria Prat (m. 1903)

Giovanni Pastrone, also known by his artistic name Piero Fosco (13 September 1883 – 27 June 1959), was an Italian film pioneer, director, screenwriter, actor and technician. He worked during the era of the silent film and influenced many important directors in the international cinema with Cabiria, such as David Wark Griffith in The Birth of a Nation (1915) and Intolerance (1916). Martin Scorsese believes that Pastrone's work in Cabiria can be considered as the invention of the epic movie and he deserves credit for many of the innovations often attributed to D.W. Griffith and Cecil B. DeMille. Among those was the extensive use of a moving camera, thus freeing the feature-length narrative film from "static gaze".

== Biography ==
Giovanni Pastrone was born in Montechiaro d'Asti. He graduated from the Turin Conservatory with a degree in violin, while also completing his accounting studies. After trying his hand at various careers, he moved to Turin with his wife in 1903 to work as a second violinist in the orchestra of the Teatro Regio.

In 1905, Pastrone joined the Turin-based film production company Carlo Rossi & C. as an accountant. Thanks to his knowledge of three foreign languages – French, English and German – Pastrone was able to rapidly climb the ladder. By 1907, he had become the company's chief executive officer. In 1908, he became a co-owner alongside Carlo Sciamengo and launched the new production company, Itala Film.

During his early years with the company, Pastrone worked as both a producer and a director. Under his leadership, Itala became renowned for its technical innovations. The company produced films synchronised with sound discs, realised successful scientific documentaries and developed a manual system for colouring films in multiple colours. Pastrone recruited numerous talented technicians and artists from the French studio Pathé, including the renowned comic actor André Deed, who was famous for playing Boireau in a series of films. Recognising Deed's potential for the Italian market, Pastrone signed him to a contract with Itala to produce one comedy film per week. The first of these, Cretinetti re dei poliziotti, made Deed famous and led to many imitations.

Pastrone personally directed several films, including Il Conte Ugolino (1909), Agnes Visconti (1909), and most notably the 30-minute silent film The Fall of Troy (1910), the first known cinematographic adaptation of Homer's epic poem, the Iliad. A pioneering "early colossal" film, The Fall of Troy is noted for its battle scenes, huge sets, and success in international markets. With over 800 actors involved in the filming, it was hailed as the most ambitious project yet attempted in the world of cinema. While it did not achieve significant success in Italy, the film was enthusiastically received in the United States, where it introduced North American audiences to Italian cinema for the first time. Its international success encouraged Pastrone to create longer, more lavish historical epics.

== Cabiria ==
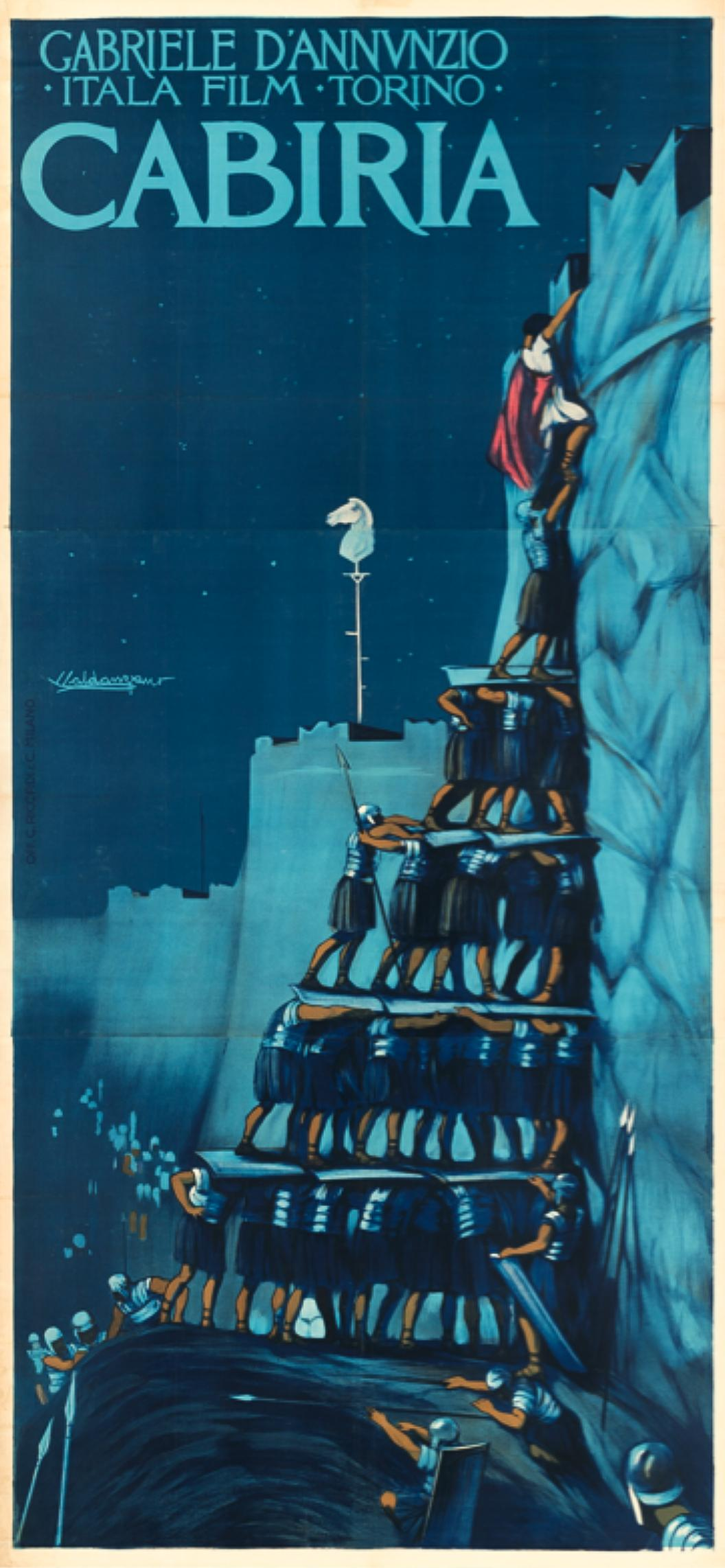
Advertising poster of Cabiria

Pastrone's greatest production was Cabiria (1914), a 35 mm film lasting approximately three hours that contributed considerably to Italy's growth in the production and distribution of feature films abroad. The film was produced in the style of an art film; one of the best Italian writers of the period, Gabriele D'Annunzio, was commissioned to write the screenplay and translate the subtitles into French, English and German. These "written intertitles" contributed to the prestige of the overall work.

The film premiered on 18 April 1914, simultaneously at the Teatro Lirico in Milan and the Teatro Vittorio Emanuele in Turin, where it was accompanied by the theatres' orchestras and choirs. The aim was to present a show that could compete with opera and appeal to bourgeois and aristocratic audiences, who had previously disdained cinematic works considered popular.

Set during the Punic Wars, the film follows the story of an abducted little girl, Cabiria, and features an eruption of Mount Etna, religious rituals in Carthage, the alpine trek of Hannibal, Archimedes' defeat of the Roman fleet at the Siege of Syracuse and Scipio maneuvering in North Africa. The artistic director and first cinematographer was the Spanish filmmaker Segundo de Chomón, who used electric lamps to create chiaroscuro effects and depict the eruption of Mount Etna realistically. Pastrone was the first film director to use the tracking shot, placing the camera on a mobile platform that he had patented two years earlier. This allowed the camera to move freely among the actors, rather than being fixed to the ground. Previously, the camera captured a static scene in which the actors entered the frame, performed their action and then exited, creating a theatrical effect. The tracking shot also enabled the camera to transition seamlessly from long shots to close-ups without cutting. Shots were taken in motion rather than in still frames, giving scenes great spatial depth. This technique had previously been used for interior sequences and Griffith later employed it in landscape shots.

Cabiria was one of the most expensive films of its time, costing around one million two hundred and fifty thousand lire in gold. This was an enormous budget compared to the average production cost of films at that time, which was around 50,000 lire. It was an enormous success, and remained in first screening for around a year in New York and six months in Paris. The film gave rise to the historical epic genre, which remained a cornerstone of both Italian and international cinema for over half a century.

== After Cabiria ==
During this period, Pastrone directed other films under the pseudonym 'Piero Fosco', given to him by D’Annunzio: The Fire (1916), Tigre reale (1916) – based on a novel by Giovanni Verga – and Hedda Gabler (1920) – based on Henrik Ibsen's play of the same name. Pastrone's cinema reveals a precise taste for spectacle, remarkable technical expertise and excellent advertising organisation.

== Retirement ==
At the height of his success in 1919, Pastrone abandoned his film career and Itala Film, which was absorbed into the conglomerate Unione Cinematografica Italiana which itself collapsed after only a few years. He refused numerous job offers in order to devote himself to medical studies. He took little interest in cinema thereafter, except sporadically, until 1931 when he supervised the musical arrangement of his film Cabiria. His health worsened following a fall and he died in Turin on 27 June 1959. He is buried in the Monumental Cemetery of Turin.

== Complete filmography ==
Year	Title	Preservation status
1908	La glu	Cineteca di Bologna, Cineteca Italiana, EYE Film Institute Netherlands and BFI National Archive
1908	Giordano Bruno eroe di Valmy	Lost
1909	Julius Caesar	Cineteca di Bologna, National Museum of Cinema and Cineteca del Friuli
1911	The Fall of Troy	Public domain; Cineteca di Bologna, EYE Film Institute Netherlands, Cineteca Italiana and Archive Film Agency
1913	Stronger than Sherlock Holmes	Public domain; EYE Film Institute Netherlands
1914	Cabiria	Public domain
1916	Tigre reale	Public domain; National Museum of Cinema
1916	The Fire	Public domain; National Museum of Cinema
1916	The Warrior	Public domain; National Museum of Cinema and Cineteca Italiana
1917	La guerra ed il sogno di Momi	Public domain; National Museum of Cinema
1918	Maciste the Athlete	George Eastman Museum Motion Picture Collection
1920	Hedda Gabler	Cineteca del Friuli
1923	Povere bimbe	Lost

=== Acting ===
- Julius Caesar (1909)

== Bibliography ==
- Alovisio, Silvio; Bertellini, Giorgio (2000). "The 'Pastrone System': Itala Film from the Origins to World War I". Film History. 12 (3): 250–261. JSTOR 3815355.
- Moliterno, Gino (2009). The A to Z of Italian Cinema. Lanham, Maryland: Scarecrow Press. ISBN 978-0810870598.
- Musso, Livio (2009). Dal sogno a Cabiria: Giovanni Pastrone a 50 anni dalla morte. Turin: Consiglio regionale del Piemonte. ISBN 978-8896074091.
- Scaparone, Sarah (6 December 2017). "Quando Giovanni Pastrone, il genio di Cabiria, lasciò il cinema per la medicina". La Repubblica.
