= Alberto Fassini =

Italian film producer

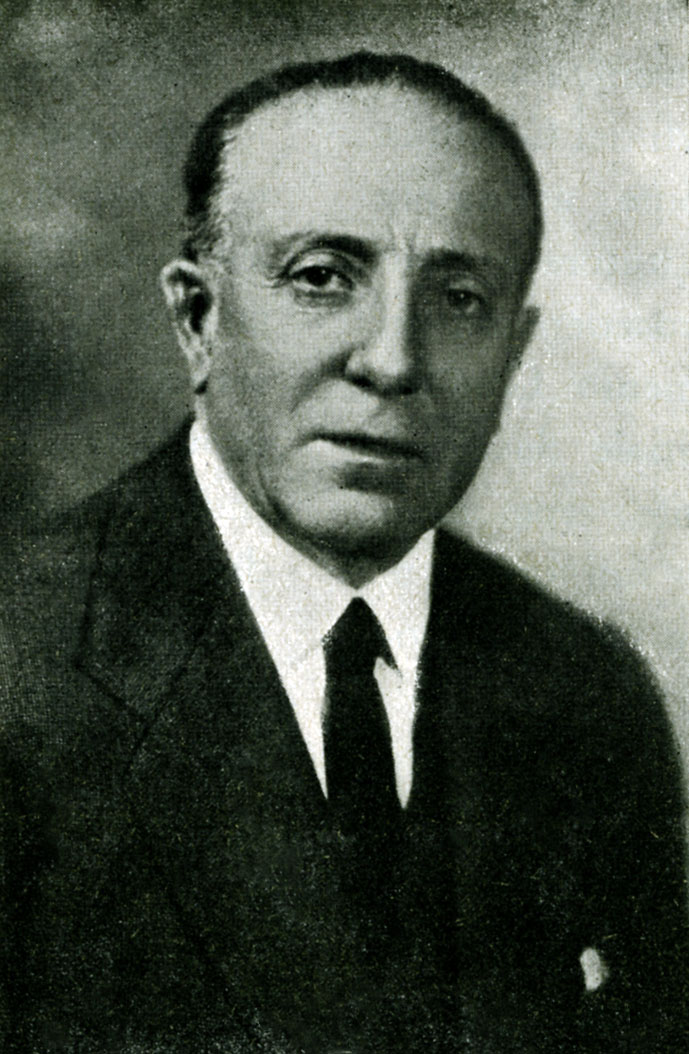
- Alberto Fassini
- Born: 8 April 1875; Moncalvo, Piedmont; Italy
- Died: 8 October 1942; Rome, Lazio; Italy
- Occupation(s): Business tycoon Film producer

Baron Alberto Fassini (1875–1942) was an Italian business tycoon and film producer. Fassini owned a large synthetic textile company, and was close to the regime of the dictator Benito Mussolini. He owned the Palazzo Tittoni where Mussolini lived from 1923 to 1929.

== Film industry ==
Fassini was connected with the Italian production company Cines during the 1910s. In 1919 he was the driving force behind the creation of Unione Cinematografica Italiana (UCI), a conglomerate of leading studios which became the largest producer in the country and aimed to compete with major international companies, particularly those in Hollywood. In 1921 UCI was badly damaged by the collapse of the Banca Italiana di Sconto, which had been a major investor. By this time Fassini had left to join the board of an American shipping company.

== Bibliography ==
- Moliterno, Gino. Historical Dictionary of Italian Cinema. Scarecrow Press, 2008.
- Margherita Sarfatti & Brian Sullivan. My Fault: Mussolini As I Knew Him. Enigma Books, 2013.
