= Naples is a Song =

1927 film

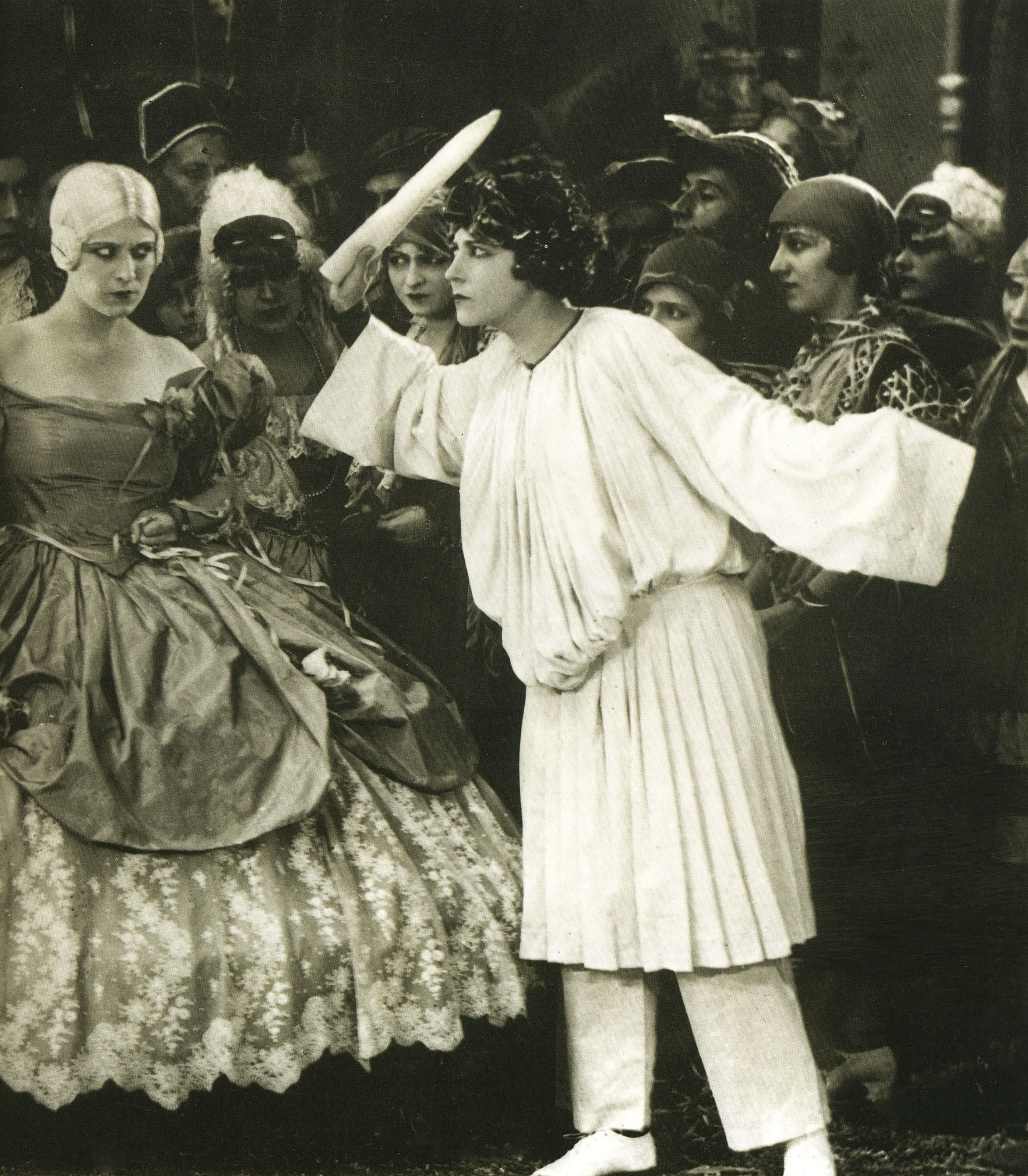
- Directed by: Eugenio Perego
- Starring: Leda Gys; Angelo Ferrari; Giuseppe Gherardi
- Cinematography: Emilio Guattari
- Production company: Lombardo Film
- Distributed by: Lombardo Film
- Release date: 18 March 1927
- Country: Italy
- Languages: Silent; Italian intertitles

Naples is a Song (Italian: Napoli è una canzone) is a 1927 Italian silent film directed by Eugenio Perego and starring Leda Gys, Angelo Ferrari and Giuseppe Gherardi.

== Cast ==
- Leda Gys as Rosella
- Angelo Ferrari as Max
- Giuseppe Gherardi as O' pazzariello
- Carlo Reiter as Don Aristide Nasetti
- Gennaro Sebastiani as Il nanetto
- Lorenzo Soderini as O' prufessore
- Grethel Stein as Mary

== Bibliography ==
- Bruno, Giuliana. Streetwalking on a Ruined Map: Cultural Theory and the City Films of Elvira Notari. Princeton University Press, 1993.
