= Cabiria =

1914 film by Giovanni Pastrone

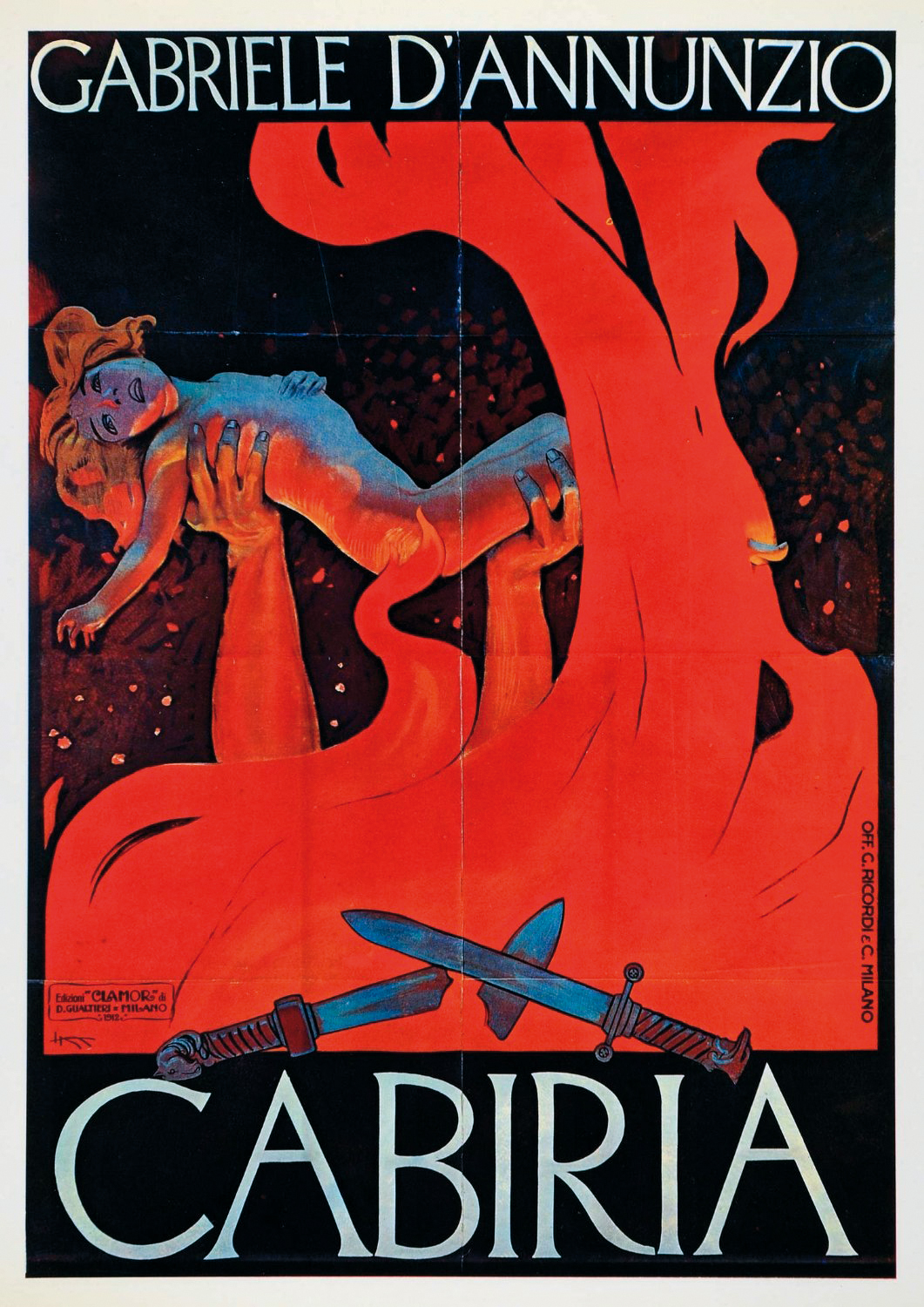
- 1914 poster, designed by Leopoldo Metlicovitz
- Directed by: Giovanni Pastrone
- Screenplay by: Giovanni Pastrone
- Based on: A book by Titus Livius and a novel by Emilio Salgari
- Produced by: Giovanni Pastrone
- Starring: Lidia Quaranta; Umberto Mozzato; Bartolomeo Pagano
- Cinematography: August Battagliotti; Eugenio Bava; Natale Chiusano; Segundo de Chomon; Carlo Franzeri; Giovanni Tomatis
- Music by: Manlio Mazza; Ildebrando Pizzetti
- Production company: Itala Film
- Release date: 18 April 1914 (Italy)
- Running time: 200 minutes (original cut); 190 minutes (2006 restoration); 148 minutes (surviving Italian cuts); 126 minutes (surviving USA cuts)
- Country: Italy
- Languages: Silent; Italian Intertitles
- Budget: £50,000
- Box office: ₤1 million

Cabiria (full video)

Cabiria is a 1914 Italian epic silent film, directed by Giovanni Pastrone and shot in Turin. The film is set in ancient Sicily, Carthage, and Cirta during the period of the Second Punic War (218–202 BC). It follows the story of an abducted little girl, Cabiria, and features an eruption of Mount Etna, religious rituals in Carthage, the alpine trek of Hannibal, Archimedes' defeat of the Roman fleet at the Siege of Syracuse and Scipio maneuvering in North Africa. Apart from being a classic on its own terms, the film is also notable for being the first film in which the long-running film character Maciste makes his debut. According to Martin Scorsese, in this work Pastrone invented the epic movie and deserves credit for many of the innovations often attributed to D.W. Griffith and Cecil B. DeMille. Among those was the extensive use of a moving camera, thus freeing the feature-length narrative film from "static gaze".

The historical background and characters in the story are taken from Livy's Ab Urbe Condita (written ca. 27–25 BC). In addition, the script of Cabiria was partially based on Gustave Flaubert's 1862 novel Salammbô and Emilio Salgari's 1908 novel Cartagine in fiamme (Carthage in Flames). It was the first film shown at the White House, having been viewed on the South Lawn, by the President, First Lady, Vice President, his wife, members of the Cabinet and their wives, due to the summer heat in June 1914.

== Plot summary ==
=== First episode ===
Batto and his young daughter, Cabiria, live in a lavish estate in the shadow of Mount Etna, at Catania, on the island of Sicily. Cabiria plays with dolls with her nurse, Croessa. When the volcanic Etna erupts violently, Batto prays to the god Pluto for deliverance but receives only a brief respite before his home and gardens are destroyed. While attempting to escape, servants discover a secret stairway leading underground. Taking advantage of the chaos and plundering Batto's hidden underground treasure, the servants, along with Croessa and Cabiria, flee to the countryside. Batto and his wife mourn the loss of Cabiria, as they believe her to be buried beneath the rubble.

=== Second episode ===
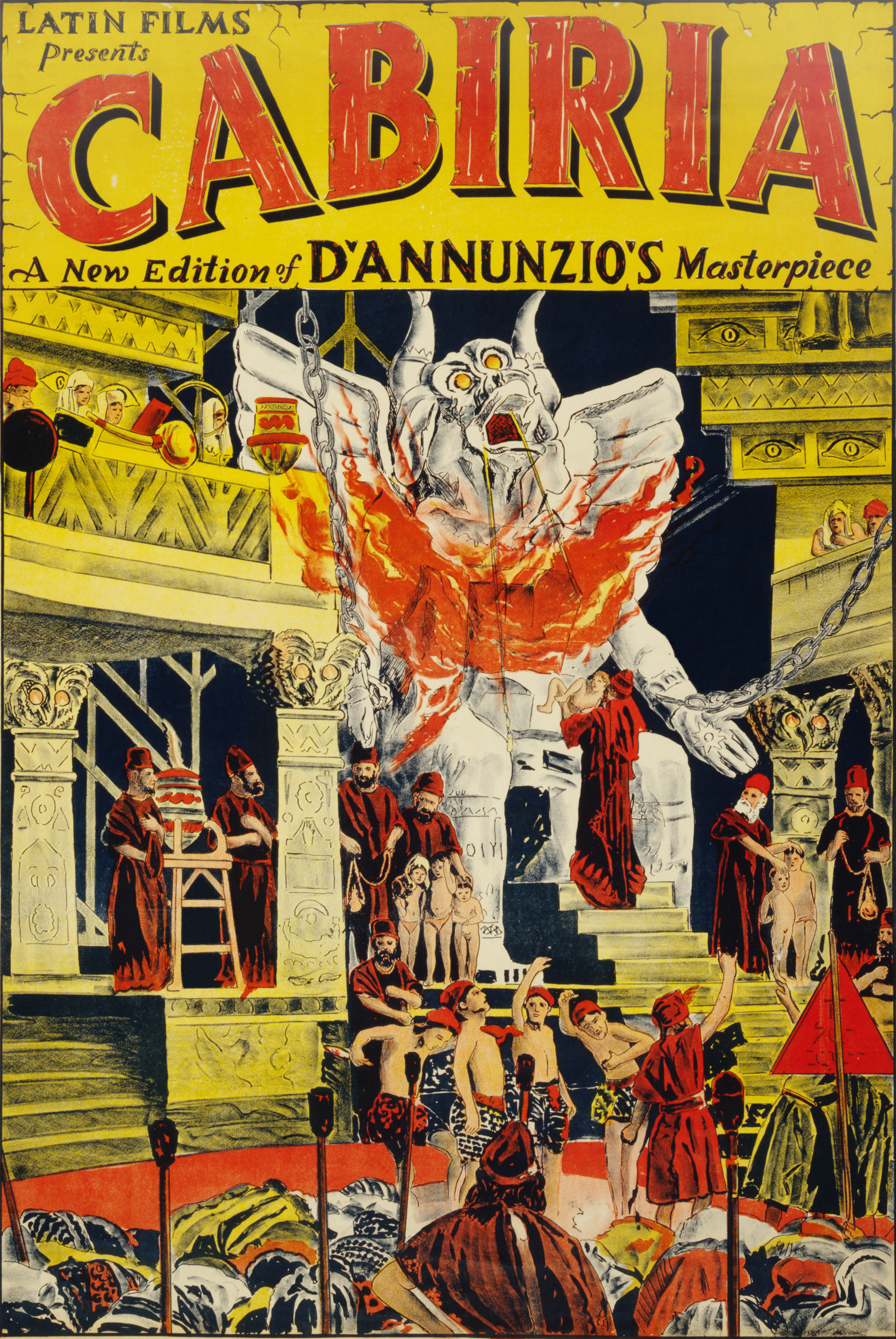
The Temple of Moloch episode, as seen on a poster

The fugitive servants divide up the treasure (Croessa gets a ring) and make for the sea but soon run afoul of Phoenician pirates who take Croessa and Cabiria to Carthage, where the little girl is sold to Karthalo, the High Priest. He intends to sacrifice her to the great god Moloch. Also in Carthage are two Roman spies: Fulvius Axilla, a Roman patrician, and Maciste, his huge, muscular slave. The innkeeper, Bodastoret, welcomes Fulvius and Maciste to his Inn of the Striped Monkey. Croessa tries to prevent the sacrifice of Cabiria by pretending that the child is ill, but Croessa is whipped for her deception. Later, she chances upon Fulvius and Maciste. Recognizing them as fellow countrymen, she implores them to assist her.

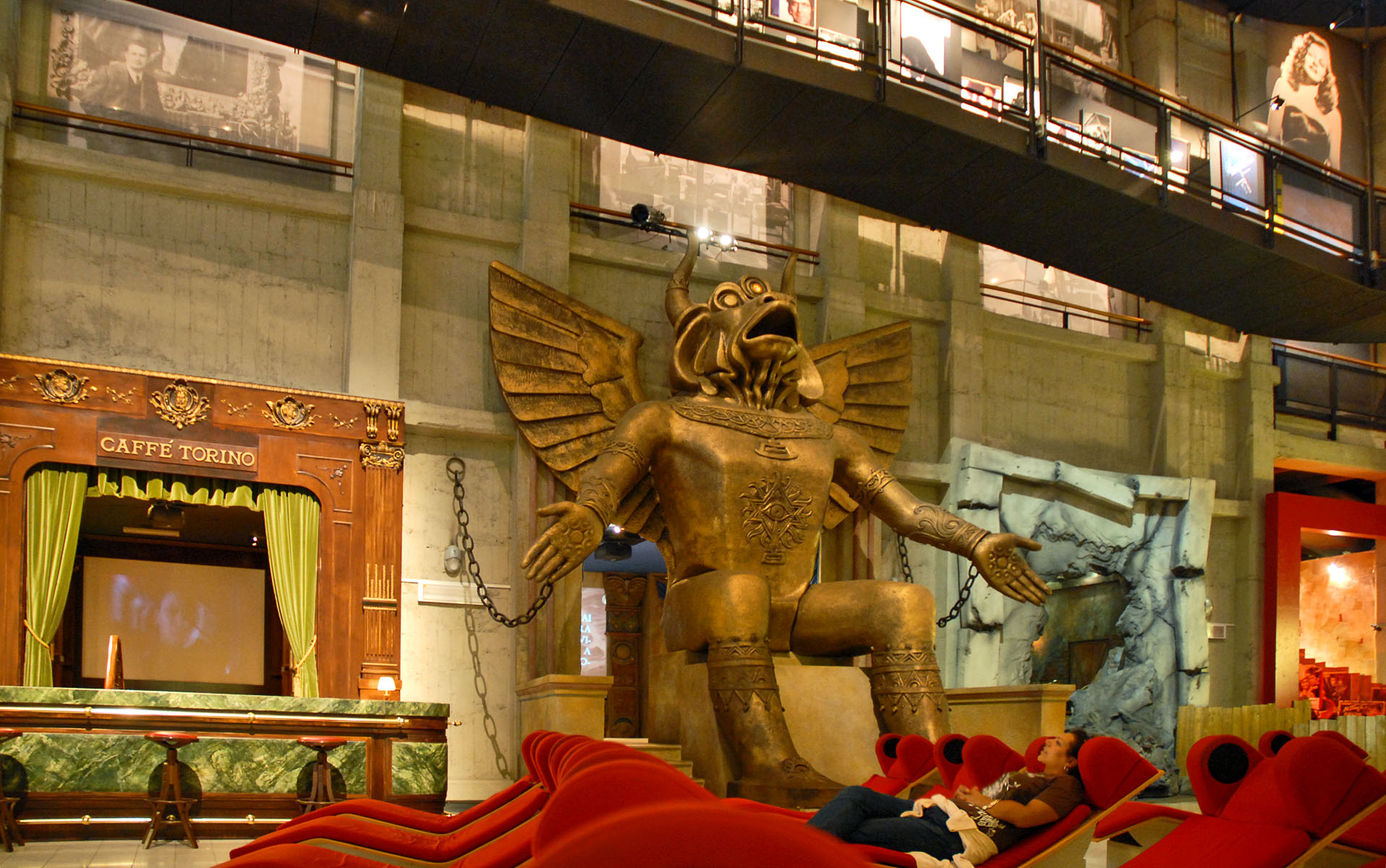
Moloch statue from Giovanni Pastrone's Cabiria (1914), National Museum of Cinema (Turin)

The entrance to the huge Temple of Moloch is a gigantic three-eyed head, with the mouth as portal. One hundred young children are to perish as offerings. Inside the temple are frenzied devotees, and the colossal seated statue of the winged god Moloch is a hollow bronze furnace. The great chest opens for each victim, and when a youngster is slid into the inferno, the door closes and the open mouth belches flame. Croessa, Fulvius, and Maciste sneak into the temple, and the slave boldly snatches Cabiria away from the priest. Pursued by a frenzied mob, they make their way up to the roof, down the gargantuan façade, and back to the inn. However, Croessa pays a fatal price for the rescue.

=== Third episode ===
Meanwhile, Hannibal and his troops make their way across the snow-laden Alps towards Rome. Soldiers, elephants and other animals pick their way through the passes. Learning of the military events, Fulvius resolves to flee back to Rome after further intimidating the innkeeper to ensure silence. Numidian King Massinissa is visiting Carthage, and Hasdrubal, brother of Hannibal, promises him his beautiful daughter, Sophonisba, in marriage. In a great audience hall with two huge elephantine columns, Massinissa dispatches gifts and a message to meet secretly to Sophonisba, who, on receiving them, is giddy with anticipation.

Bodastoret, the innkeeper, sneaks into the Temple of Moloch and for a reward betrays the Romans' whereabouts and intentions. Fulvius, Maciste, and Cabiria are ambushed by the Priest's henchmen as they attempt to flee the city the next morning, but Fulvius escapes by leaping spectacularly from a high precipice and swimming away. Maciste and Cabiria flee with henchmen hard on their heels to the cedar garden of Hasdrubal and encounter Massinissa and Sophonisba just as their secret tryst is commencing. Maciste implores the aristocratic couple, who have both concealed their true identities, to rescue Cabiria. Amid the chaos, Sophonisba, Cabiria, and a servant run away while Massinissa falsely denies to the Priest's men that he has seen any little girl. Maciste, however, is captured, tortured and chained to a great millstone, which he must turn, but he can still manage to intimidate everyone around him.

=== Fourth episode ===
The Roman navy has besieged Syracuse, a Greek ally of Carthage, and Fulvius is now participating in the fighting. The Romans, however, are frustrated by a giant array of mirrors, producing a heat ray, which is deployed by the great inventor Archimedes to set fire to the ships' sails. The Roman fleet is spectacularly destroyed.

Fulvius, still bearing the ring Croessa had given him, is cast adrift and soon rescued. Although his rescuers rob the unconscious Fulvius, one of them recognizes the ring on his finger, and he is carried to Batto's house, which has been rebuilt. The parents are overjoyed to learn that Cabiria is still alive, at least when he last saw her. As he takes his leave, Fulvius vows to seek Cabiria if he should ever return to Carthage.

=== Fifth episode ===
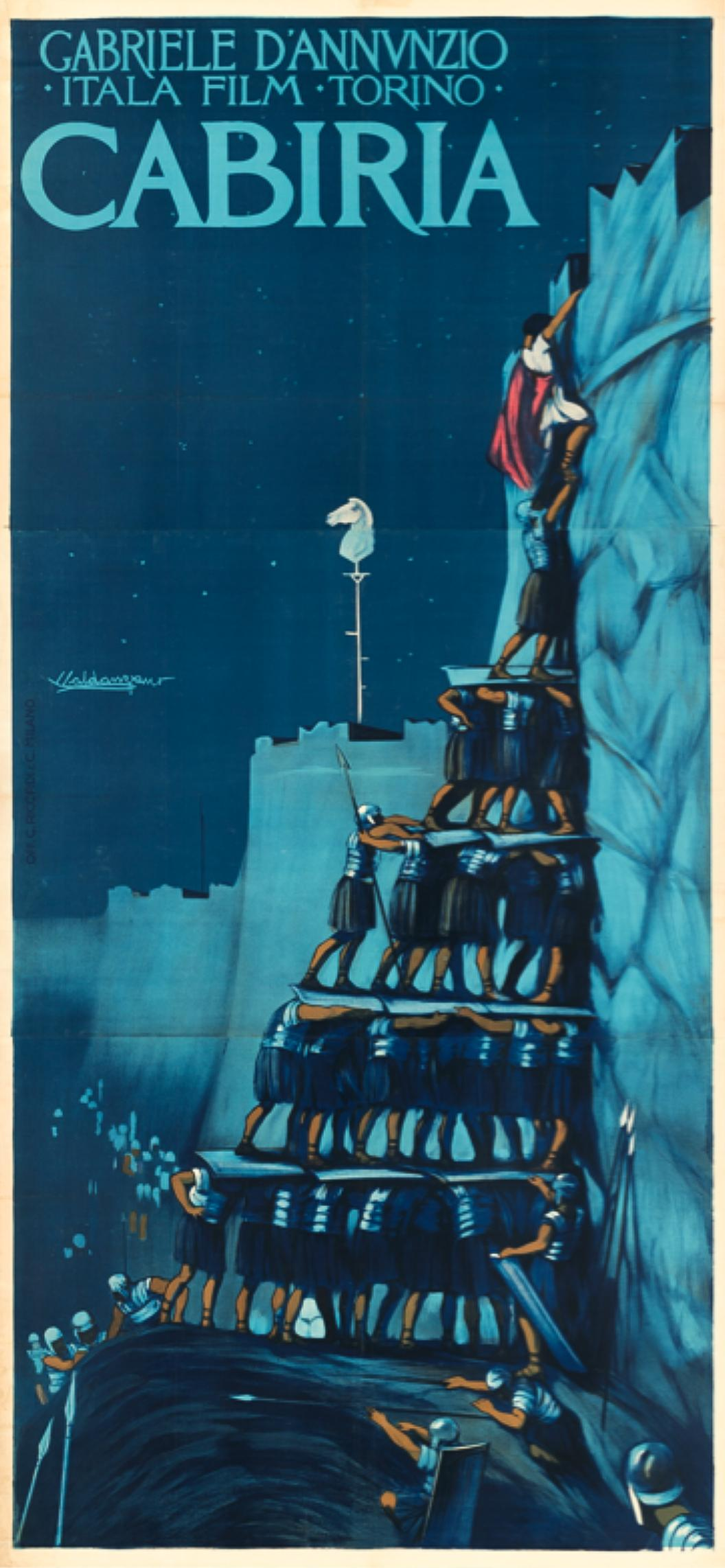
Cabiria poster portraying the human pyramid scene

An intertitle relates that Syphax, King of Cirta, a rival desert kingdom, has deposed Massinissa and caused him to disappear into the desert. Hasdrubal now gives Sophonisba to the victor instead to strengthen his new alliance against Rome. Sophonisba is distinctly unhappy, and when she appears in her finery at the betrothal ceremony, she swoons and breaks the ceremonial vessel.

Already in possession of much of North Africa, the Roman general and consul Scipio strategizes with his new ally, Massinissa. They dispatch the resourceful Fulvius again as a spy in Carthage to observe its defenses. Stealthily deploying an impressive human pyramid of Roman soldiers, Fulvius successfully breaches the city walls.

In the elephantine hall, Hasdrubal dispatches the High Priest Karthalo on a mission to persuade Syphax to attack the Romans directly. Karthalo's camel caravan traverses the vast dunescape. Meanwhile, Fulvius finds time to look for Maciste and Cabiria, now prisoners for 10 years. With a combination of intimidation and bribery, he extracts information from Bodastoret. With Fulvius disguised as a freedman, they secretly observe Maciste still in chains and harnessed to his millstone. That night, Fulvius returns to wake the sleeping strongman who is overwhelmed with happiness at again seeing his beloved master. Back at their hideout at the inn, Bodastoret is overcome with shock at seeing Maciste and dies. Fulvius and Maciste escape down the city walls.

In Cirta, before a palace with two huge feline columns, Syphax is given a formal sendoff by Sophonisba and Karthalo, the latter of whom has an eye for the former's lovely slave, "Elissa". While the military maneuvers continue, Fulvius and Maciste have fallen into dire straits, exhausted and thirsty in the desert wilderness. Maciste catches sight of a fire in the distance, as Syphax's encampment has been torched by his enemies. The two Romans are soon captured by the mounted Cirtans.

While outside the city, King Syphax has been captured, Maciste and Fulvius are swept up with other prisoners within Cirta's city walls. "Elissa", who is really Cabiria, takes pity on the imprisoned pair and passes water to them without recognizing who they are. Cirta is under siege by Massinissa's forces. Soldiers scale ladders outside the walls while boulders, spears, arrows, and boiling oil rain down on them.

Sophonisba dreams of triple-eyed Moloch. Unnerved, she interprets her dream as an omen that Cabiria/Elissa will somehow spell the doom of the city and confesses to Karthalo what happened in the cedar garden so many years ago.

Maciste, who has forced open the iron bars of his prison cell with his enormous strength, determines to exact revenge upon Karthalo. He intrudes through a window just in time to save Elissa, whom he now recognizes as Cabiria, from being raped by the priest. Fulvius soon joins the fray, but in the chaos of flight, they lose control of Cabiria and are forced to barricade themselves in a store room. Fulvius is appalled to learn that the girl is none other than Cabiria.

Just outside the city walls is another appalling sight: King Syphax is in chains taunted by the victorious King Massinissa, who is now dressed in Roman military regalia. The Cirtans have had enough and surrender. In the hall of the gigantic feline columns, Sophonisba grandiloquently surrenders and abases herself before her former fiancé and present husband's captor, Massinissa. He, in turn, demurs and, just as elaborately, pledges himself to her. In a ceremonial hall with indigenous deities, the pair further ritualize their solidarity. Sophonisba marries Massinissa, and it is resolved that she will not be subjected to being paraded in a Roman triumph.

Fulvius and Maciste enjoy the ample provisions of the store room until the besieging guards attempt to smoke them out. Massinissa learns of the circumstances of the two "heroes" and, apparently ambivalent about such former Roman comrades, determines to spare them. Fulvius takes the opportunity to implore Sophonisba on Cabiria's behalf, but in a fit of pique, she tells the distraught Roman that Cabiria is dead.

Scipio and his lieutenant, Lelius, camp near Cirta. Lelius, whose forces have preceded Scipio's, tells his commander of the royals' treachery. At first, Massinissa arrogantly defies Scipio, dashing the Roman general's message tablet to pieces but later wilts in the face of Rome's majesty. He implores Scipio, however, to spare Sophonisba the humiliation of being paraded in Rome. Scipio will not relent.

In desperation, Massinissa persuades Fulvius, in reciprocation for having spared him earlier and in anticipation of an unspoken future favor, to lend him his slave Maciste. The slave receives a bracelet, inscribed with a message, and takes it to Queen Sophonisba. Receiving it, the Queen reads the message and understands that she is to poison herself with the powder in the hollow gift. Drinking the dissolved poison, Sophonisba divests herself of her jewelry with great flourishes. Fulvius arrives and, too late, they realize the purpose of Massinissa's request. Sophonisba, writhing in agony, reveals that Cabiria still lives and, as repayment for the gift of death, she will be spared a second time from the fate of living sacrifice. Cabiria is retrieved from her prison cell and arrives in time to see the moribund Queen expire.

Fulvius and Cabiria cross the sea on the way to Rome. As Maciste plays the panpipes in the bowsprit, Fulvius pledges his love to Cabiria and festive sea sprites encircle the boat in a giant, diaphanous garland.

== Cast and characters ==
Historical figures denoted by an asterisk (*).

- Carolina Catena ... Cabiria, as a Child
- Émile Vardannes ... Batto, father of Cabiria
- Gina Marangoni ... Croessa, nurse of Cabiria
- Lidia Quaranta ... Cabiria, as an adult
- Dante Testa ... Karthalo, the High Priest of Carthage
- Umberto Mozzato ... Fulvio (Fulvius) Axilla, Roman patrician and spy
- Bartolomeo Pagano ... Maciste, slave of Axilla
- Raffaele di Napoli ... Bodastoret, an Innkeeper
- Émile Vardannes ... Hannibal*, Carthaginian general

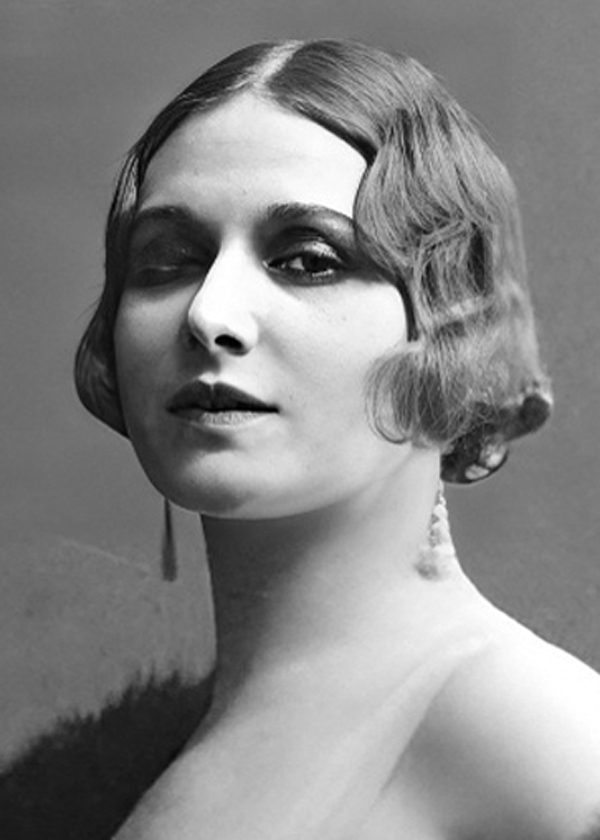
Actress Lidia Quaranta, who played the title role

- Edoardo Davesnes ... Hasdrubal*, Carthaginian general; brother of Hannibal
- Italia Almirante-Manzini ... Sofonisba* (Sophonisba), daughter of Hasdrubal
- Alessandro Bernard ... Siface* (Syphax), King of Cirta
- Luigi Chellini ... Scipione* (Scipio), Roman consul and general
- ?????????? ... Lelius* (Gaius Laelius), friend and sub-commander of Scipio
- Vitale Di Stefano ... Massinissa* (Masinissa), King of Numidia
- Enrico Gemelli ... Archimede* (Archimedes), Greek engineer and philosopher
- Ignazio Lupi ... Arbace

== Production ==
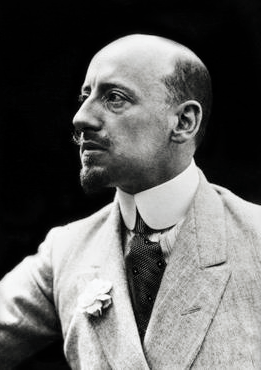
Gabriele D'Annunzio

Italian author Gabriele D'Annunzio contributed to the screenplay, writing all of the intertitles, naming the characters and the movie itself. The film was noted as being the first popular film to use the tracking shot – the camera is mounted on a dolly allowing it to both follow action and move within a film set or location. The tracking shot in itself was nothing new. "Panorama" effects (lateral and vertical) had been used frequently in film since 1896, but Cabiria, with the new freedom provided by the dolly, is innovative in introducing "zoom" movement, towards and away from the scene, which for years afterwards was referred to by both cameramen and directors as a "Cabiria" shot. This movement was such an innovation at the time that other film makers quickly incorporated it. The film was a major influence on D.W. Griffith's Intolerance (1916) but he never uses "Cabiria" shots; the famous crane shot moving down and into the festival in Babylon is a "panorama" effect.

The elephants used in several scenes in the film are Indian elephants, rather than the much smaller and less intimidating North African elephant (which, though used in Hannibal's invasion, was long extinct at time of filming) or the African elephant (which is undomesticable).

Film critic Roger Ebert, who gave the film four out of four stars and added it to his Great Movies list, has said that Griffith "moves the camera with greater freedom and has a headlong narrative and an exciting use of cross-cutting that Pastrone does not approach". The film also marked the debut of the Maciste character, who went on to have a long career in Italian sword and sandal films.

== Music ==
The pastiche film score was composed largely by Manlio Mazza, who reworked the music of several composers including Mozart, Mendelssohn, Spontini, Donizetti and Gluck. But the film also contained an original composition by Mazza's former teacher Ildebrando Pizzetti, which was composed on D'Annunzio's recommendation: the ten-minute Sinfonia del fuoco. The piece was written to accompany the Invocation to Moloch, in the pivotal Second Episode of the film, when one hundred naked children are sacrificed to the god of Carthage. Scored for a large orchestra, including six first and six second violas, baritone, and a mixed chorus of more than five parts, the Sinfonia del fuoco was performed once only, on the evening of the film's première, conducted by Mazza, at the Teatro Vittorio Emanuele in Turin, on 18 April 1914. Contemporary reviews indicate that on this occasion the work was performed as an Overture at the start of the film.

The size of the forces involved, coupled with Pizzetti's refusal to allow others to conduct the work, and the fact that he himself never included it in his own concerts, meant that no further performances took place until 1988, when the 1914 version of the film was presented, with live orchestral accompaniment of the complete score, at the Orto Botanico, Rome. The Sinfonia del fuoco has since been recorded by Naxos Records in 1997.

== Distribution, remake and restorations ==
Cabiria was released in Italy on April 18, 1914.

In June 1914, Cabiria became the first motion picture to be screened at the White House, when a screening on the lawn was viewed by President Wilson and his family from the porch and lawn chairs. (The Birth of a Nation was the first movie shown in the White House, in the East Room.)

A restored version of Cabiria was screened on 27 May 2006 at the Cannes Film Festival, featuring a filmed introduction by director Martin Scorsese.

== See also ==
- 1914 in film
- List of historical drama films
- epic film
