= Luigi Serventi =

Italian actor

Luigi Serventi (31 July 1885 – 18 August 1976) was an Italian film actor.

== Partial filmography ==
- Il prezzo del perdono (1913)
- Bianco contro negro (1913)
- La lega dei diamanti (1913)
- La parola che uccide (1914)
- La dote del burattinaio (1914)
- Dopo il veglione (1914)
- Vizio atavico (1914)
- La conquista dei diamanti (1914)
- La fuga degli amanti (1914)
- Mezzanotte (1915)
- Passa la guerra (1915)
- Il figlio della guerra (1916)
- La piccola ombra (1916)
- The Courier of Moncenisio (1916)
- Cavalleria rusticana (1916)
- Il malefico anello (1916)
- Mimì e gli straccioni (1916)
- La crociata degli innocenti (1917)
- Il re, le Torri e gli Alfieri (1917) - Rolando, re di Fantasia
- La Bohème (1917)
- Le mogli e le arance (1917) - Marquis Marcello
- Napoleoncina (1918)
- Il giardino incantato (1918)
- The Railway Owner (1919) - Duca di Bligny
- Noris (1919)
- A Woman's Story (1920) - Paolo
- La bambola e l'amore (1920)
- Hereny Vencida (1920)
- The Story of a Poor Young Man (1920) - Massimo
- Il volto di Medusa (1920)
- La storia di una cigaretta (1921)
- Il mercante di emozioni (1921)
- Suprema bellezza (1921)
- La mirabile visione (1921)
- Marito, moglie e... (1921)
- A Dying Nation (1922, part 1, 2)
- La Boheme (1923) - Vicomte Paul
- The Money Devil (1923) - Marquis Redonc
- Der Tiger des Zirkus Farini (1923)
- Bob und Mary (1923)
- Muz bez srdce (1923) - Roger Lynne
- Darling of the King (1924)
- La moglie bella (1924)
- The Story of Lilian Hawley (1925) - Jonny
- La via del peccato (1925)
- Love's Finale (1925) - Graf Ermete Chassard
- Voglio tradire mio marito (1925) - Lo scapolo impenitente
- The Sun Disciples (1926) - Radim Sylvan / Viktor Sylvan
- Maciste in the Lion's Cage (1926) - Strasser
- Her Husband's Wife (1926)
- The Giant of the Dolomites (1927) - Müller, l'avventurieno
- Caught in Berlin's Underworld (1927) - Graf Egglio
- Die raffinierteste Frau Berlins (1927) - Henrik Svensen
- The Man with the Limp (1928) - McHenning, Völkerbund-Delegierter
- The President (1928) - Don Germo / Geronimo Cortez
- Vienna, City of My Dreams (1928) - Prinzgemahl
- Leontine's Husbands (1928)
- The Confessions of a Woman (1928)
- A Girl with Temperament (1928) - Prinz Solm
- Erotikon (1929) - Jean
- The Storyteller of Venice (1929)
- The White Roses of Ravensberg (1929) - von Kurla
- Ship of Girls (1929)
- Mountains on Fire (1931) - Arthur Franchini, sein Freund
- Militiaman Bruggler (1936) - Italian officer (final film role)

== Bibliography ==
- Vacche, Angela Dalle. Diva: Defiance and Passion in Early Italian Cinema. University of Texas Press, 2008.
