= Eugenia Paulicelli =

Italian-American academic

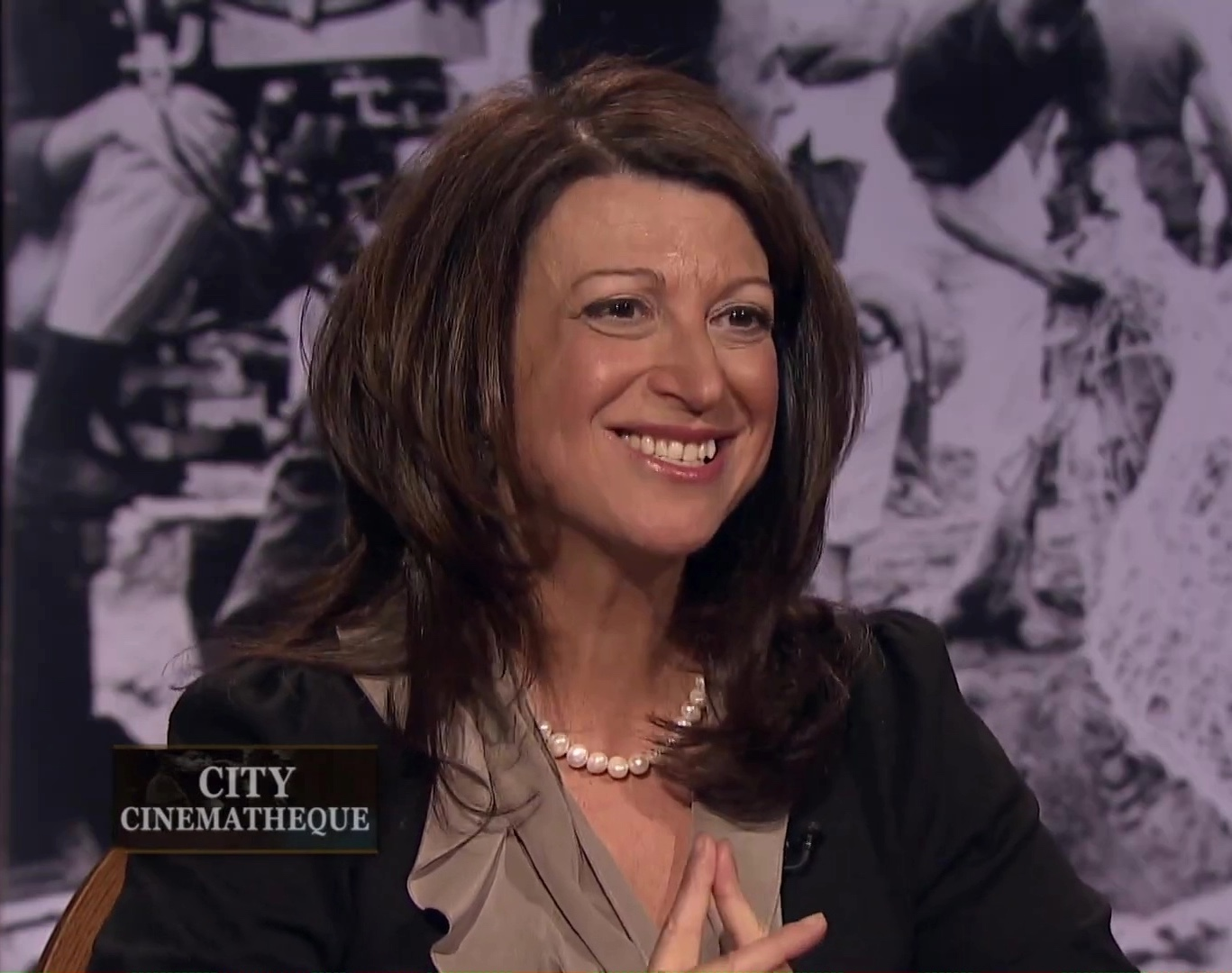
Paulicelli on CUNY TV's City Cinematheque, 2011

Eugenia Paulicelli is a professor of Italian Studies, Comparative Literature, and Women’s Studies at Queens College and The CUNY Graduate Center. She is also the founder and director of the Fashion Studies Program at The Graduate Center.

Paulicelli writes the column “Fashionology” for La Voce di New York, is a member of the advisory board for Women’s Studies Quarterly, and is on the editorial board of the academic journal Fashion, Film and Consumption. As an author, she is largely collected by libraries worldwide.

== Biography ==
Paulicelli was born on January 28, 1958 in Canosa di Puglia to Nunzio and Anna Paulicelli. She is the youngest of three children.

Paulicelli received her laurea from the University of Bari, Italy, in semiotics and literary studies. After completing her PhD in Italian and French at the University of Wisconsin–Madison, she taught in the Department of Italian Studies at Wellesley College in Massachusetts. She joined the faculty at Queens College in 1992 as a professor in the Department of Romance Languages. In 1999, she was appointed to the PhD Program in Comparative Literature and, in 2002, she was appointed to the Women’s Studies Certificate Program, also at the CUNY Graduate Center.

Paulicelli’s scholarly work is wide-ranging and interdisciplinary. Her research focuses on visual and material culture, and the relationship in literature, media, film, and fashion between the word and the image. Her research in Fashion Studies examines how fashion functions as an industry and as a symbolic force, mediated across time and space. She has taught courses on fashion cultures, film and screen media, Italian literature, and national identity.

Additionally, she has curated several exhibitions including "The Fabric of Cultures: Fashion, Identity, Globalization," which was held at the Godwin-Ternbach Museum at Queens College in 2006 and traveled to the Museum of Craft and Folk Art in San Francisco in 2008. In 2010, she curated "Fashion + Film: The 1960s Revisited" held at the James Gallery at The CUNY Graduate Center, and in 2010 co-curated the New York edition of the "Birds of Paradise" film festival from Saint Martin's School of Art, London. In 2012, she curated a film series at the Museum of the Moving Image celebrating the centenary of Michelangelo Antonioni’s birth.

She is a guest professor in the Fashion Studies PhD program at The Stockholm University was awarded the Benjamin Meaker Visiting Professorship at the University of Bristol in 2013.

Her recent scholarly work has expanded to include environmental and social justice issues within fashion. She has authored, edited, or co-edited several books published after 2013, including a new and expanded edition of Fashion under Fascism (2025), Moda e Cinema in Italia. Dal Muto ai nostri giorni (2020), Italian Style. Fashion & Film from Early Cinema to the Digital Age (2016), Film, Fashion and the 1960s (co-editor, 2017), and Moda e Letteratura nell’Italia della prima modernità (2019). She also co-edited The Routledge Companion to Fashion Studies (2021).

Paulicelli produced and co-created educational short films on Italian designers in a series titled The New Made in Italy and is currently working on a documentary called “Untold Stories of New York Fashion. Italian Diasporic Communities.” She collaborates extensively with Italian cultural institutions, and her projects have received funding from the Italian Foreign Ministry.

In summer 2025, Paulicelli launched The Fashion Institute at the CUNY Graduate Center as a new professional development program focused on the fashion industry, especially in New York City. It offers four one-week sessions at the Graduate Center’s Midtown Manhattan campus covering key innovations, trends, and issues such as sustainability, social justice, AI applications, and digital marketing in fashion and beauty industries. The institute aims to provide expert insights from distinguished faculty and industry leaders.

The program is open to fashion professionals, students, and educators worldwide and leverages New York City’s cultural and fashion ecosystem to deliver its curriculum. Participants of the Fashion Institute receive certificates of completion for each module attended. The program also hosts public masterclasses with major voices in fashion.

In June 2026, Eugenia Paulicelli co-curated the exhibit "Sarmi New York: Un viaggio nella moda da Firenze a Fifth Avenue". A new exhibition at the Museum of Costume and Fashion at Palazzo Pitti in Florence with Vanessa Gavioli, the head curator of the museum. The exhibition, on view from 18 June to 31 December 2026 in the Ballroom and adjoining rooms, focuses on the Florentine designer Ferdinando Sarmi, who built a major career in New York and became known for dressing prominent women including Audrey Hepburn, Marilyn Monroe, Marlene Dietrich, Barbra Streisand, and the Duchess of Windsor. It presents garments from the Sarmi archive alongside period accessories in order to situate his work within the social and cultural world of 1950s and 1960s New York. Reporting on the exhibition described it as the first major show devoted to Sarmi at Palazzo Pitti and emphasized its role in restoring him to scholarly and public attention as an important figure in postwar international fashion. One account also noted that the exhibition is tied to Paulicelli’s broader research on Sarmi and led to the documentary Ferdinando Sarmi – Untold Stories of New York Fashion, which premiered at the museum on 18 June 2026.

Paulicelli lives in Madison, Connecticut with her husband, Dr. David Ward, who was also an Italian Professor at Wellesley College, before he retired in 2023. They married in Paulicelli's hometown, Canosa di Puglia, on June 11, 1994.

In February 1998, they had their only daughter, Anna, who attended Daniel Hand High School and Trinity College.

== Bibliography ==
- Fashion under Fascism: Beyond the Black Shirt, Second Edition Bloomsbury Academic / Berg Publishers, 2025
- The Fabric of Cultures: Systems in the Making, QCArtCenter, City University of New York, 2017, ISBN 8826494878 / 978-8826494876.
- Italian Style: Fashion & Film from Early Cinema to the Digital Age, Bloomsbury Academic, 2016, ISBN 1441189157 / 978-1441189158.
- Rosa Genoni: Fashion is a Serious Business / La moda é una cosa seria, Italy: Deleyva Editore, 2015
- Writing Fashion in Early Modern Italy: From Sprezzatura to Satire, Routledge, 2014, ISBN 9781472411709
- The Fabric of Cultures: Fashion, Identity, and Globalization, Routledge, 2009, ISBN 9780415775434 / 9780415775427
- Fashion under Fascism: Beyond the Black Shirt, Bloomsbury Academic / Berg Publishers, 2004, ISBN 9781859737781
