= Epic film =

Style of filmmaking with large scale, sweeping scope, and spectacle

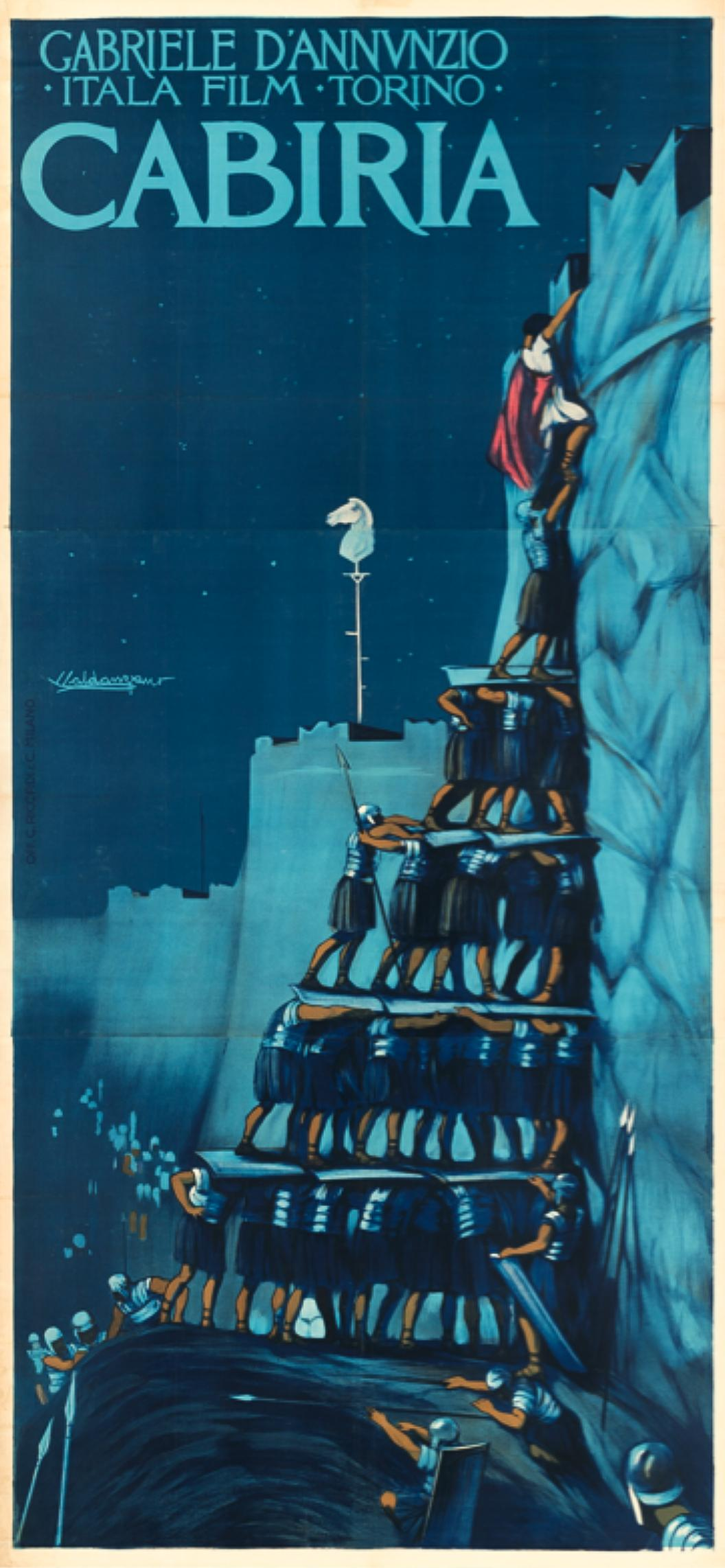
The 1914 Italian film Cabiria is one of the earliest known epic films.

Epic films are films which have large scale, sweeping scope, and spectacle. The term is slightly ambiguous, sometimes designating a film genre and at other times simply big-budget films. Like epics in the classical literary sense, an epic film is often focused on a heroic character. An epic's ambitious nature helps to set it apart from other genres such as the period piece or adventure film.

Epic historical films would usually take a historical or a mythical event and add an extravagant setting, lavish costumes, an expansive musical score, and an ensemble cast, which would make them extremely expensive to produce. The most common subjects of epic films are royalty and important figures from various periods in world history.

== Characteristics ==
The term "epic" originally came from the poetic genre exemplified by such works as the Epic of Gilgamesh and the works of the Trojan War Cycle. In classical literature, epics are considered works focused on deeds or journeys of heroes upon which the fate of many people depends. Similarly, films described as "epic" typically take a historical character, or a mythic heroic figure. Common subjects of epics are royalty, gladiators, great military leaders, or leading personalities from various periods in world history. However, there are some films described as "epic" almost solely on the basis of their enormous scope and the sweeping panorama of their settings, such as How the West Was Won or East of Eden, that do not have the typical substance of classical epics but are directed in an epic style.

When described as "epic" because of content, an epic movie is often set during a time of war or other societal crisis, while usually covering a longer span of time sometimes throughout entire generations coming and passing away, in terms of both the events depicted and the running time of the film. Such films usually have a historical setting, although speculative fiction (i.e. fantasy or science fiction) settings have become common in recent decades. The central conflict of the film is usually seen as having far-reaching effects, often changing the course of history. The main characters' actions are often central to the resolution of the societal conflict.

In its classification of films by genre, the American Film Institute limits the genre to historical films such as Ben-Hur. However, film scholars such as Constantine Santas are willing to extend the label to science-fiction films such as 2001: A Space Odyssey and Star Wars. Lynn Ramey suggests that "Surely one of the hardest film genres to define is that of the 'epic' film, encompassing such examples as Ben-Hur, Gone with the Wind and more recently, 300 and the Star Wars films [...] none of these comes from literary epics per se, and there is little that links them with one another. Among those who espouse film genre studies, epic is one of the most despised and ignored genres". Finally, although the American Movie Channel formally defines epic films as historical films, they nonetheless state the epic film may be combined with the genre of science-fiction and cite Star Wars as an example.

Stylistically, films classed as epic usually employ spectacular settings and specially designed costumes, often accompanied by a sweeping musical score, and an ensemble cast of bankable stars. Epics are usually among the most expensive of films to produce. They often use on-location filming, authentic period costumes, and action scenes on a massive scale. Biographical films may be less lavish versions of this genre. They often have a Roadshow theatrical release and are often shot on 70 mm film.

Many writers may refer to any film that is "long" (over two hours) as an epic, making the definition epic a matter of dispute, and raise questions as to whether it is a "genre" at all. As Roger Ebert put it, in his "Great Movies" article on Lawrence of Arabia:

The word epic in recent years has become synonymous with big-budget B picture. What you realize watching Lawrence of Arabia is that the word epic refers not to the cost or the elaborate production, but to the size of the ideas and vision. Werner Herzog's Aguirre: The Wrath of God didn't cost as much as the catering in Pearl Harbor, but it is an epic, and Pearl Harbor is not.

== History ==
The epic is among the oldest of film genres, with one early notable example being Giovanni Pastrone's Cabiria, a two-and-a-half hour silent film about the Punic Wars, which laid the groundwork for the subsequent silent epics of D. W. Griffith.

The genre reached a peak of popularity in the early 1960s, when Hollywood frequently collaborated with foreign film studios (such as Rome's Cinecittà) to use relatively exotic locations in Spain, Morocco and elsewhere for the production of epic films such as El Cid (1961) or Lawrence of Arabia (1962). Epic films also saw expansions eastwards, where culturally rich Asian nations such as Japan and India produced landmark and ambitious historical epics such as Seven Samurai (1954) and Mughal-e-Azam (1960), with both movies banking upon the romanticized zeitgeist of their culturally unique historical eras. This boom period of international co-productions is generally considered to have ended with Cleopatra (1963), The Fall of the Roman Empire (1964) and Doctor Zhivago (1965). Nevertheless, films in this genre continued to appear, with one notable example being War and Peace, which was released in the former Soviet Union during 1967–1968. Epic films continue to be produced, although since the development of CGI they typically use computer effects instead of an actual cast of thousands. Since the 1950s, such films have regularly been shot with a wide aspect ratio for a more immersive and panoramic theatrical experience.

Epic films were recognized in a montage at the 2006 Academy Awards.

== Public reception ==
=== Gross revenue ===
The enduring popularity of the epic is often credited to their ability to appeal to a wide audience. Several of the highest-grossing films of all-time have been epics. James Cameron's 1997 film Titanic, which is cited as helping to revive the genre, grossed $1.8 billion at cinemas worldwide to become the highest-grossing film—a record it held for twelve years. If inflation is taken into account, then the historical romantic epic Gone with the Wind is the highest-grossing film ever, with two other romantic epics (Titanic and Doctor Zhivago) also featuring among the global top ten.

=== Academy Awards ===
As of October 2024, the most Academy Awards ever won by a single film stands at eleven. This feat has only been achieved by three films: Ben-Hur (1959), Titanic (1997) and The Lord of the Rings: The Return of the King (2003), all of which are above three hours long and considered epic films.

== See also ==
- Historical fantasy
- Historical fiction
- Historical drama
- Planetary romance
- Sword-and-sandal
- Sword and sorcery
