= Febo Mari =

Italian actor and film director

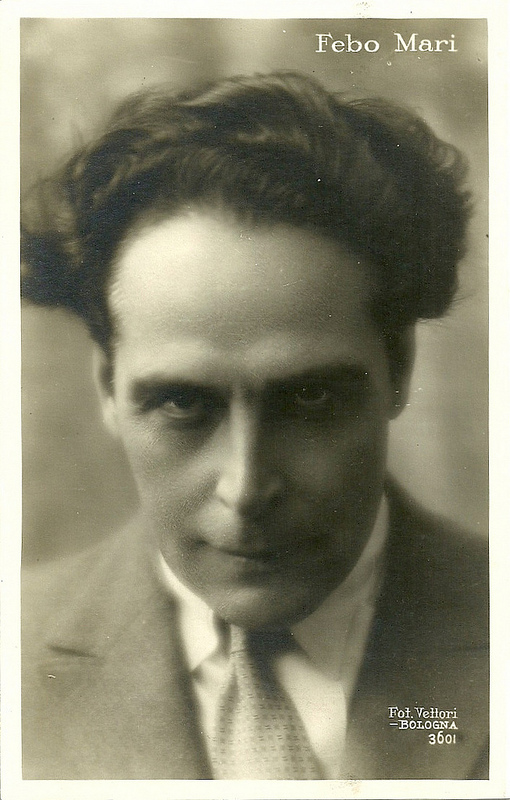
- Born: Alfredo Giovanni Leopoldo Rodriguez; 18 January 1884 or 16 January 1884; Messina, Sicily, Italy
- Died: 6 June 1939 (aged 55); Rome, Lazio, Italy
- Education: Peloritana University
- Occupations: Actor, writer, director
- Years active: 1912–1938 (film)
- Spouses: Berta Vestri (m. 1908; died 1938) Nietta Mordeglia (m. 1938)

Febo Mari (1884–1939) was an Italian actor and film director. He found success as a leading man during Italy's silent film era.

== Early life ==
Febo Mari was born Alfredo Giovanni Leopoldo Rodriguez in Messina, Sicily. His family were wealthy and of Iberian descent. He graduated from Peloritana University, having studied literature and philosophy, and soon began acting in theatre. By age 27 he was managing the Manzoni Theater in Milan.

He entered the silent film industry in the early 1910's. His first feature length film was La ribalta (1912), directed by prolific Mario Caserini. The first film Mari acted in and scripted was Il fuoco (1915). Il fauno (1917), one of Mari's best known films, it was restored in 1994 by Cinematek from original nitrate prints, obtained from the Cineteca Friuli and the National Museum of Cinema.

== Personal life ==
On 23 December 1908, Mari married the actress Berta Vestri. The relationship did not last, and Mari and Vestri eventually separated informally. He began a long-term romantic relationship with actress Antonietta "Nietta" Mordeglia (also known as Misa Mordeglia Mari). The duo starred together in Il Fauno (1917). As divorce was not yet legal in Italy, Mari and Mordeglia married on 8 October 1938, after Vestri's death.

== Selected filmography ==
L'emigrante

- La ribalta (1912)
- L'emigrante (1915)
- Il fuoco (1916)
- Tigre reale (1916)
- Il Fauno (1917)
- Maddalena Ferat (1920)
- Assunta Spina (1930)
- The Three Wishes (1937)
- Giuseppe Verdi (1938)
- The Count of Brechard (1938)
- Battles in the Shadow (1938)

== Bibliography ==
- Anna Gural & Robert Singer. Zola and Film: Essays in the Art of Adaptation. McFarland, 2005.
