= Unione Cinematografica Italiana =

Italian film consortium of the silent era

- Industry: Film production; Film distribution
- Founded: January 1919; 107 years ago
- Defunct: 1926
- Headquarters: Italy

The Unione Cinematografica Italiana (UCI) was an Italian film production and distribution consortium of the silent era. Following the end of the First World War, a group of eleven leading Italian companies joined forces in a single conglomerate which would be better able to compete with rival films from America, Britain, France and Germany. The driving force behind UCI was Baron Alberto Fassini, who had previously headed the Cines studio.

UCI was formed in January 1919. Many of the company's productions were historical films which attempted to re-capture the success of pre-war films which were often set in Ancient Rome.

The company suffered a major blow in 1921 when its leading financial backer the Banca Italiana di Sconto went bust. UCI was already facing bankruptcy during the production of the big-budget epic Quo Vadis (1924), the financial failure of which led to the collapse of the company by 1926. Most of its assets were acquired by Stefano Pittaluga. The collapse of UCI was part of a general crisis in the Italian film industry that saw production levels fall to very low levels until a revival began with the support of Benito Mussolini's Fascist government in the 1930s.

== Bibliography ==
- Moliterno, Gino. Historical Dictionary of Italian Cinema. Scarecrow Press, 2009.
- Ricci, Steven. Cinema and Fascism: Italian Film and Society, 1922–1943. University of California Press, 2008.
