= 1937 in animation =

Events in 1937 in animation.

== Events ==
=== January ===
- January 9:
  - The first solo appearance of Donald Duck, Don Donald premieres, directed by Ben Sharpsteen and produced by Walt Disney Productions. It leads to the formation of the Donald Duck series in December.
  - Tex Avery's Porky Pig cartoon Porky the Wrestler premieres, produced by Leon Schlesinger Productions.
- January 24: Georg Woelz' Die Schlacht um Miggershausen premieres.

=== February ===
- February 6: David Hand's Mickey Mouse cartoon Magician Mickey premieres, produced by Walt Disney Productions.
- February 20: Ben Sharpsteen's Mickey Mouse, Donald Duck and Goofy cartoon Moose Hunters premieres, produced by Walt Disney Productions.
- February 27: Tex Avery's Porky Pig cartoon Picador Porky premieres, produced by Leon Schlesinger Productions. This cartoon marks Mel Blanc's first voice acting role in a cartoon.

=== March ===
- March 4: 9th Academy Awards: The Country Cousin, produced by Walt Disney Productions, wins the Academy Award for Best Animated Short.
- March 6: Tex Avery's I Only Have Eyes for You premieres, produced by Leon Schlesinger Productions.
- March 12: The Metro-Goldwyn-Mayer cartoon studio is established.
- March 26; In Crystal City, Texas, spinach growers erect a statue of Popeye.

=== April ===
- April 3: Frank Tashlin's Porky Pig cartoon Porky's Romance premieres, produced by Leon Schlesinger Productions, where Petunia Pig makes her debut, It is also the last time Joe Dougherty voiced Porky.
- April 17: Tex Avery's Porky Pig cartoon Porky's Duck Hunt premieres, produced by Leon Schlesinger Productions, where Daffy Duck makes his debut. Mel Blanc takes over as the voice of Porky in this short.
- April 27: The Mickey Mouse cartoon Mickey's Amateurs, directed by Pinto Colvig, Erdmann Penner and Walt Pfeiffer, premieres.

=== May ===
- May 1: Tex Avery's Ain't We Got Fun premieres, produced by Leon Schlesinger Productions.
- May 7: Workers at Fleischer Studios go on strike over pay and working conditions. The strike ends several months later on October 12.
- May 15: David Hand's Little Hiawatha premieres, produced by Walt Disney Productions. It marks the debut of Hiawatha who will later become a popular comics character.
- May 22: Friz Freleng's Clean Pastures premieres, produced by Leon Schlesinger Productions. This short later became part of the Censored Eleven.
- May 29: Jack King's Silly Symphony cartoon Modern Inventions premieres, produced by Walt Disney Productions. Final solo appearance of Donald before he receives his own series.

=== June ===
- June 5: Tex Avery's Uncle Tom's Bungalow premieres, produced by Leon Schlesinger Productions. This short later became part of the Censored Eleven.

=== July ===
- July 17: Tex Avery's Egghead Rides Again premieres, produced by Leon Schlesinger Productions, which marks the debut of titular character Egghead.

=== August ===
- August 21: Tex Avery's A Sunbonnet Blue premieres, produced by Leon Schlesinger Productions.

=== September ===
- September 11: Tex Avery's Porky Pig cartoon Porky's Garden premieres, produced by Leon Schlesinger Productions.
- September 25: Tex Avery's I Wanna Be a Sailor premieres, produced by Leon Schlesinger Productions.

=== October ===
- October 9: Bob Clampett's Porky Pig cartoon Rover's Rival premieres, produced by Leon Schlesinger Productions. This was the first Looney Tunes short to feature both the iconic "Merry-Go-Round Broke Down" theme song and the iconic end card with Porky appearing out of a drum and saying "Th-th-that's all, folks!" to the audience.
- October 15: Ben Sharpsteen's Clock Cleaners, produced by Walt Disney Productions, starring Mickey Mouse, Donald Duck and Goofy, is first released.

=== November ===
- November 5: Wilfred Jackson's The Old Mill premieres, produced by Walt Disney Productions. It marks the first use of the multiplane camera.
- November 6: Tex Avery's Little Red Walking Hood premieres, produced by Leon Schlesinger Productions. An early version of Elmer Fudd makes his debut in this short.
- November 26: The Popeye cartoon Popeye the Sailor Meets Ali Baba's Forty Thieves premieres, produced by Fleischer Studios.

=== December ===
- December 2: Ferdinand Diehl, Paul Diehl and Hermann Diehl's The Seven Ravens premieres, which is notable for being an animated feature film, several weeks before Disney's own animated feature film Snow White premieres. However, The Seven Ravens is done in stop-motion, while Snow White features pencil animation.
- December 10: The first Donald Duck cartoon cartoon, Jack King's Donald's Ostrich premieres, produced by Walt Disney Productions.
- December 21: Walt Disney's first animated feature, Snow White and the Seven Dwarfs premieres, co-directed by David Hand, William Cottrell, Wilfred Jackson, Larry Morey, Perce Pearce and Ben Sharpsteen. It becomes a global box office hit.
- December 24: Burt Gillett's Mickey Mouse, Donald Duck and Goofy film Lonesome Ghosts premieres, produced by Walt Disney Productions.

== Films released ==
- April 10 - The Tale of the Fox (France)
- May 19 - The Academy Award Review of Walt Disney Cartoons (United States)
- December 2 - The Seven Ravens (Germany)
- December 21 - Snow White and the Seven Dwarfs (United States)

== Births ==
=== January ===
- January 1:
  - Bernard Longpré, Canadian animator and animation director (Monsieur Pointu), (d. 2002).
  - Myrna Gibbs, American ink & paint artist (The Flintstones, DePatie-Freleng Enterprises, Marvel Productions, Peanuts specials), (d. 2021).
- January 2: Terence Rigby, English actor (voice of Silver in Watership Down), (d. 2008).
- January 6: Jaime Diaz, Argentine-born American animator (Warner Bros. Cartoons, Hanna-Barbera, Ruby-Spears Enterprises), sheet timer (Klasky-Csupo, Jumanji, Dora the Explorer, Danger Rangers, American Dad!, Curious George) and director (Duckman, The Fairly OddParents, ChalkZone), (d. 2009).
- January 7: Myrna Bushman, American animation checker (Ruby-Spears Enterprises, DIC Entertainment), storyboard artist (DIC Entertainment, Jetlag Productions, Daisy-Head Mayzie, Doug, PB&J Otter, Stanley), sheet timer (Spiral Zone, Tiny Toon Adventures, Stunt Dawgs, All-New Dennis the Menace, Jumbo Pictures), production assistant (Marvel Productions), production coordinator (Disney Television Animation) and director (Muppet Babies, Bill & Ted's Excellent Adventures, Doug), (d. 2022).
- January 11: Felix Silla, American actor (additional voices in The Lord of the Rings), (d. 2021).
- January 30: Vanessa Redgrave, English actress (voice of the Queen of England and Mama Topolino in Cars 2).
- January 31: Suzanne Pleshette, American actress (voice of Zira in The Lion King II: Simba's Pride, Yubaba and Zeniba in the English dub of Spirited Away), (d. 2008).

=== February ===
- February 1: Garrett Morris, American actor and comedian (portrayed himself in the Family Guy episode "Barely Legal", voice of Jack in Easter Fever, Chief Williams in Pound Puppies, Buzzard in the Happily Ever After: Fairy Tales for Every Child episode "Pinocchio", Al McGee in the Justice League episode "In Blackest Night", Albert in the Fairfax episode "Fairfolks").
- February 2: Tom Smothers, American comedian and musician (voice of Ted Edward Bear in The Bear Who Slept Through Christmas, Tom in the Dr. Katz, Professional Therapist episode "Ben-Centennial", himself in The Simpsons episode "Oh Brother, Where Bart Thou?"), (d. 2023).
- February 8: Joe Raposo, American composer, songwriter, pianist, singer and lyricist (Sesame Street, Raggedy Ann & Andy: A Musical Adventure, Dr. Seuss, Madeline), (d. 1989).
- February 15: Ron Dias, American animator and painter (worked for Don Bluth and Walt Disney Company), (d. 2013).
- February 17: Benjamin Whitrow, English actor (voice of Fowler in Chicken Run), (d. 2017).

=== March ===
- March 1: Eugen Doga, Moldovan composer (Maria, Mirabela), (d. 2025).
- March 3: Bobby Driscoll, American actor (voice of the title character in Peter Pan), (d. 1968).
- March 10: Robert Abel, American visual effects artist (Tron), (d. 2001).
- March 12: Carlo Bonomi, Italian voice actor and clown (voice of the title character of La Linea, Paperazzi in Calimero, Red and Blue in The Red and the Blue, the title characters and other various characters in Stripy and Pingu), (d. 2022).

=== April ===
- April 6: Billy Dee Williams, American actor (voice of Lando Calrissian in the Star Wars franchise, Two-Face in The Lego Batman Movie, Admiral Bitchface in Titan Maximum, himself in The Boondocks episode "The Story of Lando Freeman", The Life & Times of Tim episode "A Tale of Two Rodneys/Keith to the Rescue", and the Scooby-Doo and Guess Who? episode "Scooby-Doo and the Sky Town Cool School!").
- April 19: Elinor Donahue, American retired actress (voice of Mom in Eek! The Cat, Queen Eleanora in The Legend of Prince Valiant episode "The Jubilee", Munsterella in the Biker Mice from Mars episode "A Scent, a Memory, a Far Distant Cheese").
- April 20: George Takei, American actor, author and activist (voice of Hikaru Sulu in Star Trek: The Animated Series, and the Star Trek: Lower Decks episode "Crisis Point 2: Paradoxus", First Ancestor in Mulan and Mulan II, Kyo Heyerdahl in Hey Arnold!, Master Sensui in Kim Possible, Galactus in The Super Hero Squad Show, Mr. Fixx in the Batman Beyond episode "Rebirth", General Lok Durd in the Star Wars: The Clone Wars episode "Defenders of Peace", Mr. Littlepot in the Amphibia episode "The Shut-In!", Wong in the Spider-Man: The Animated Series episode "Doctor Strange", High Mystic in the Jackie Chan Adventures episode "The Chosen One", himself in the Futurama episodes "Where No Fan Has Gone Before", "Proposition Infinity", "Zapp Dingbat", and "Saturday Morning Fun Pit", the Glenn Martin, DDS episode "GlennHog Day", The Simpsons episode "The Burns Cage", the American Dad! episode "N.S.A. (No Snoops Allowed)", and the Scooby-Doo and Guess Who? episode "Hollywood Knights!").
- April 24: Otmar Gutmann, German TV producer, animator and director (creator of Pingu), (d. 1993).
- April 27: Patricia Hamilton, Canadian actress (voice of Mother Nature in A Miser Brothers Christmas, Rachel Lynde in Anne of Green Gables: The Animated Series), (d. 2023).

=== May ===
- May 1: Nelda Ridley, American animation checker (Bakshi Animation, Hanna-Barbera, Cartoon Network Studios), (d. 2003).
- May 2: Lorenzo Music, American actor (voice of Garfield in Garfield and Friends, Tummi Gummi in Adventures of the Gummi Bears, Peter Venkman in The Real Ghostbusters, Ralph the All-Purpose Animal in Twice Upon a Time), (d. 2001).
- May 7: Yevhen Syvokin, Soviet and Ukrainian director (Fragments, The Man Who Could Fly, The Tale of Good Rhino, Fraction), ( (d. 2026).
- May 8: Thomas Pynchon, American novelist (voiced himself in The Simpsons episodes "Diatribe of a Mad Housewife" and "All's Fair in Oven War").
- May 11: Takashi Inagaki, Japanese voice actor (voice of Mosquito in Soul Eater, Cain in The Seven Deadly Sins, Joseph Dzhugashgvili in Saga of Tanya the Evil: The Movie, Godo in the Berserk episode "Epiphany", Japanese dub voice of the Warden in Megamind, Magic Mirror in House of Mouse, Palpatine in Star Wars: The Clone Wars and Star Wars: Rebels), (d. 2025).
- May 12: George Carlin, American comedian, actor, author and social critic (voice of Rufus in Bill & Ted's Excellent Adventures, the Narrator in Thomas & Friends, Zugor in Tarzan II, Fillmore in Cars, Wizard in Happily N'Ever After, Munchie in The Simpsons episode "D'oh-in' in the Wind"), (d. 2008).
- May 16: Yvonne Craig, American actress (voice of Grandma Pig in Olivia), (d. 2015).
- May 24: Bill Exter, American animator (Warner Bros. Animation, Ruby-Spears, Bebe's Kids, The Pagemaster, Cats Don't Dance), production manager (Warner Bros. Animation), animation checker (Nickelodeon Animation Studio, Toonsylvania, Mad Jack the Pirate) and director (Marvel Productions).
- May 26: Monkey Punch, Japanese manga artist (creator of Lupin III), (d. 2019).

=== June ===
- June 1: Morgan Freeman, American actor (voice of Vitruvius in The Lego Movie, himself in the Scooby-Doo and Guess Who? episode "The Last Inmate!").
- June 2: Sally Kellerman, American actress, singer and author (voice of The Seal in The Mouse and His Child, Sunburn in Happily Ever After, the Narrator in Delgo, Principal Stark in Unsupervised, Marshmallow Queen and Romaine Empress in The High Fructose Adventures of Annoying Orange, Dolores Barren in High School USA!), (d. 2022).
- June 3: Edward Winter, American actor (voice of Dr. Buzz Kutt and Owner in Aaahh!!! Real Monsters, President, Sarge and Guard in The Real Adventures of Jonny Quest, Scientist #1 and other various characters in The Angry Beavers), (d. 2001).
- June 11:
  - Johnny Brown, American actor and singer (voice of Splashdown in Rickety Rocket), (d. 2022).
  - Irén Henrik, Hungarian cinematographer (Mattie the Goose-boy), (d. 2026).
- June 15: Waylon Jennings, American singer, songwriter and musician (voice of Judge Thatcher in Tom Sawyer, the Balladeer in The Angry Beavers episode "The Legend of Kid Friendly", himself in the Family Guy episodes "Chitty Chitty Death Bang" and "To Love and Die in Dixie"), (d. 2002).
- June 17: Arthur Schmidt, American film editor (Who Framed Roger Rabbit), (d. 2023).
- June 20: Antanas Janauskas, Lithuanian film director, designer and writer, (d. 2016).
- June 28: Tom Magliozzi, American radio host (voice of Click Tappet in the Arthur episode "Pick a Car, Any Car", and Click and Clack's As the Wrench Turns, Rusty Rust-eze in Cars and Cars 3) and television writer (Click and Clack's As the Wrench Turns), (d. 2014).

=== July ===
- July 2:
  - Jim Duffy, American animator (Hanna-Barbera, Klasky-Csupo), (d. 2012).
  - Richard Petty, American racing driver (voice of Strip Weathers in the Cars franchise).
- July 6:
  - Ned Beatty, American actor (voice of Lotso in Toy Story 3, Tortoise John in Rango), (d. 2021).
  - Ro Marcenaro, Italian animator and comics artist, (d. 2020).
- July 12: Bill Cosby, American comedian and actor (creator of Fat Albert and the Cosby Kids, Little Bill, and Fatherhood, and voice of the title character in the former).
- July 13: Hurey, Belgian animator (Belvision) and comics artist, (d. 2001).
- July 25: Paul Collins, British actor (voice of John Darling in Peter Pan).
- July 26: Clifton Jones, Jamaican-British actor (voice of Blackavar in Watership Down), (d. 2025).
- July 31: Sab Shimono, American actor (voice of Uncle in Jackie Chan Adventures, Takagawa in Scooby-Doo! and the Samurai Sword, the Emperor in Samurai Jack, Gyatso in Avatar: The Last Airbender, Mr. Murakami in Teenage Mutant Ninja Turtles, Grandpa Park in Stretch Armstrong and the Flex Fighters, K3NT in the Legion of Super Heroes episode "The Man from the Edge of Tomorrow").

=== August ===
- August 4: David Seidler, British-American screenwriter (Quest for Camelot, The King and I), (d. 2024).
- August 8:
  - Tom Georgeson, British actor (voice of Jacob in the Animated Tales of the World episode "The Enchanted Lion: A Story from Germany"), dies at age 88.
  - Dustin Hoffman, American actor and filmmaker (voice of Master Shifu in the Kung Fu Panda franchise, Milquetoast the Cross-Dressing Cockroach in A Wish for Wings That Work, Benedict Arnold in Liberty's Kids, Roscuro in The Tale of Despereaux, Mr. Bergstrom in The Simpsons episode "Lisa's Substitute").
- August 21: Masako Sugaya, Japanese actress (voice of Maki Aikawa in Aim for the Ace!, Remi in Nobody's Boy: Remi, Ganko in Perman), (d. 2021).

=== September ===
- September 2: Len Carlson, Canadian actor (voice of Green Goblin in Spider-Man, Herc Stormsailor in Jayce and the Wheeled Warriors, Professor Coldheart in Care Bears, Bert Raccoon in The Raccoons, Putter in Popples, Papa Kitty in Hello Kitty's Furry Tale Theater, Buzz in Cyberchase, Pappy in Rolie Polie Olie, Minimus P.U. in Atomic Betty, Principal Mulligan in Flying Rhino Junior High, Robert Kelly in X-Men: The Animated Series, Ganon in The Legend of Zelda and Captain N: The Game Master, Loki in The Marvel Super Heroes), (d. 2006).
- September 6:
  - Jo Anne Worley, American actress and comedian (voice of Armoire the Wardrobe in Beauty and the Beast, Hopopotamus in The Wuzzles, Nose in Pound Puppies, Sgt. Bertha Blast in The All-New Popeye Hour, Queen Morphia in Nutcracker Fantasy, Bouffant Beagle in the DuckTales episode "The Good Muddahs", Mrs. Rockweller in the Kim Possible episode "Downhill").
  - Sergio Aragonés, Spanish-born Mexican cartoonist and writer (voice of Paco in The Casagrandes episode "Mexican Makeover", himself in the Futurama episode "Lrrreconcilable Ndndifferences").
  - Joe Denton, American background artist (Ghostbusters, She-Ra: Princess of Power, Warner Bros. Animation) and storyboard artist (Camp Candy, Warner Bros. Animation, Jumanji, Sabrina: The Animated Series, Family Guy), (d. 2003).
- September 10: Brian Murray, South African actor and theater director (voice of Long John Silver in Treasure Planet), (d. 2018).
- September 13:
  - Don Bluth, American animator (Walt Disney Animation Studios) and film director (Banjo the Woodpile Cat, The Secret of NIMH, An American Tail, The Land Before Time, All Dogs Go to Heaven, Rock-a-Doodle, Thumbelina, A Troll in Central Park, The Pebble and the Penguin, Anastasia, Bartok the Magnificent, Titan A.E., founder of Sullivan Bluth Studios and Fox Animation Studios).
  - Fred Silverman, American television executive and producer (Scooby-Doo, Where Are You!, Mighty Orbots, Piggsburg Pigs!, creator of Meatballs & Spaghetti), (d. 2020).
- September 15: Anatoly Petrov, Russian film director and animator (Happy Merry-Go-Round, Polygon), (d. 2010).
- September 21: Ron Cobb, American cartoonist, animator, director and screenwriter (Walt Disney Animation Studios), (d. 2020).
- September 28: Rod Roddy, American radio and television announcer (voice of Mike the Microphone in House of Mouse, Johnny in the Garfield and Friends episode "Over the Rainbow"), (d. 2003).

=== October ===
- October 11: Ron Leibman, American actor (voice of Ron Cadillac in Archer, Rabbi in the Rugrats episode "Chanukah", Geofredo in the Duckman episode "Papa Oom M.O.W. M.O.W."), (d. 2019).
- October 15: Linda Lavin, American actress and singer (voice of Mama Bird in the Courage the Cowardly Dog episode "Watch the Birdies", Helen in the Bob's Burgers episode "It Snakes a Village", Barb in Diary of a Wimpy Kid: Rodrick Rules, Mrs. Steunberg in Whitewash), (d. 2024).
- October 17: Paxton Whitehead, English actor (voice of King Salazar in Wakko's Wish, Commander in The Real Adventures of Jonny Quest episode "The Darkest Fathoms"), (d. 2023).
- October 20: Jonas Rodrigues de Mello, Brazilian actor (voice of Shadowseat in Cassiopeia, Montanha in The Happy Cricket and the Giant Bugs, Brazilian dub voice of various villains in Dragon Ball Z and Rataxes in The Adventures of Babar), (d. 2020).

=== November ===
- November 4: Loretta Swit, American actress (voice of Marcia Cates in the Batman: The Animated Series episode "Mad as a Hatter", Judge in the I Am Weasel episode "Law of Gravity"), (d. 2025).
- November 6: Eugene Pitt, American musician (composed the theme music of Nickelodeon), (d. 2018).
- November 12:
  - Pino Colizzi, Italian actor and voice actor (Italian dub voice of Charlie B. Barkin in All Dogs Go to Heaven, Robin Hood in Robin Hood), (d. 2026).
  - Mills Lane, American boxing referee (host of Celebrity Deathmatch), (d. 2022).

=== December ===
- December 1:
  - Bruce Brown, American film director (voice of the Narrator in the SpongeBob SquarePants episode "SpongeBob SquarePants vs. The Big One"), (d. 2017).
  - Gennady Sokolsky, Russian children's book illustrator, animator and film director (Happy Merry-Go-Round, Well, Just You Wait!, The Adventures of Lolo the Penguin), (d. 2014).
- December 14: Jerry Eisenberg, American animator (The Peter Potamus Show, My Little Pony, Frankenstein Jr. and The Impossibles, Super Friends, Spider-Man, House of Mouse), (d. 2025).
- December 21: Jane Fonda, American actress, activist, and former fashion model (voice of Shuriki in Elena of Avalor, The Dragon in Luck, Grandmamah in Ruby Gillman, Teenage Kraken, Maxine Lombard in The Simpsons episode "Opposites A-Frack").
- December 28: Del Casher, American composer (KaBlam!, Robotech: Love Live ALive) and producer (Sakura Wars, Tenchi Muyo!, Love Hina), (d. 2026).

== Deaths ==
=== April ===
- April 10: Ralph Ince, American cartoonist, animator, actor, film director and screenwriter (worked as an animator under Winsor McCay), dies at age 50.

=== July ===
- July 4: Georg Jacob, German orientalist and Turkologist, (he produced scholarly research into the subject of shadow play. Shadow plays are considered a precursor to silhouette animation), dies at age 75.
- July 20: Elmer Wait, American animator (Warner Bros. Cartoons, namesake of Elmer Fudd), dies at age 23.

=== October ===
- October 17: George R. Tweedie, English businessman, (he gained fame in 1891 by running a popular magic lantern show, titled "Gossip about Ghosts". The show, which cost sixpence, consisted of fifty slides, each illustrating a story about ghosts or supernatural occurrences), dies at age 79–80.

== See also ==
- List of anime by release date (pre-1939)
