= Pingu in the City =

Japanese television series

- English logo
- ピングー in ザ・シティ
- Genre: Comedy
- Based on: Pingu
- Creator: Otmar Gutmann
- Director: Naomi Iwata
- Music: Ken Arai
- Country of origin: Japan
- Original language: Japanese
- No. of seasons: 2
- No. of episodes: 52

Production
- Studios: DandeLion Animation Studios (S1); Polygon Pictures (S2)
- Producers: Sayako Uchida; Ryo Nakaoka; Christopher Keenan; Keisuke Tsuchibashi; Yukiko Yaki; Hideki Moriya
- Production companies: Mattel Creations; NHK; NHK Enterprises; Polygon Pictures

Original release
- Network: NHK Educational TV
- Release: October 7, 2017 – March 30, 2019

Pingu in the City (Japanese: ピングー in ザ・シティ, Hepburn: Pingū in za Shiti) is a Japanese animated children's television series produced by DandeLion Animation Studios and Polygon Pictures. It is a spin-off of the stop-motion television series Pingu. The series first aired on NHK Educational TV in Japan from October 7, 2017 to March 30, 2019.

== Premise ==
The series was adapted from the famous stop-motion animated series Pingu, which was created in 1986 by Otmar Gutmann and Erika Brueggemann for the SRF in Switzerland. In this series, Pingu and his family move from their home in the Antarctic to a large city, where the inhabitants are all very different. The mischievous and curious Pingu makes a big effort to help the citizens with their jobs, but his attempts to do so often result in trouble.

== Production ==
The series is co-produced by American company Mattel Creations (who acquired HIT Entertainment in 2011) and Japanese companies NHK, NHK Enterprises and Polygon Pictures, with animation produced by DandeLion Animation Studios in the same style as the original stop-motion series through computer-animation. and distributed across the world by Sony Creative Products, the Japanese license holders for the Pingu franchise.

It was directed by Naomi Iwata and written by both Kimiko Ueno and Shigenori Tanabe, with music by Ken Arai. It features voices by Ryota Iwasaki and Fumiya Tanaka, in a similar style to Carlo Bonomi, David Sant, and Marcello Magni, who voiced characters in the original series.

A second season premiered from October 6, 2018 (which was the day before the 1st anniversary of the show) to March 30, 2019.

== International airings ==
The series was first screened outside of Japan at the MIPJunior 2017 event at Cannes. In Australia, the show premiered on June 4, 2018, on ABC Kids. In the United States, the show was first screened at the Chicago International Television Festival and the 2018 Animation Block Party.

In October 2018, Sony Creative Products sub-licensed distribution rights to the series to Sony Music Entertainment España for Latin America and most of Europe.

In the United Kingdom, the show premiered on February 25, 2019, on ITVBe's preschool block LittleBe. In Brazil, the show premiered in April 2019 through the preschool channel Gloobinho. On Hop! Channel in Israel, the show premiered in summer 2019.

== Episodes ==
=== Season 1 (2017–18) ===
No.	Title	Original release date
1	"Pingu Cooks Up a Treat!"; Transliteration: "Pingū, Sutāshefu ni Naru" (Japanese: ピングー、スターシェフになる)	October 7, 2017
2	"Watch Your Step, Pingu!"; Transliteration: "Tadaima Kōji-chū!" (Japanese: ただいま工事中！)	October 14, 2017
3	"Pingu's Rules of Babysitting"; Transliteration: "Komori wa Tsurai yo" (Japanese: 子守はつらいよ)	October 21, 2017
4	"Baker Pingu/Pingu the Baker"; Transliteration: "Pingū, Pandzukuri Meijin ni Naru" (Japanese: ピングー、パン作り名人になる)	October 28, 2017
5	"Pingu the Super Substitute"; Transliteration: "Sūpā Sabu Tōjō" (Japanese: スーパーサブ登場)	November 4, 2017
6	"Pingu at your Service"; Transliteration: "O Ryōri Todokemasu!" (Japanese: お料理届けます！)	November 11, 2017
7	"Power Up Pingu"; Transliteration: "Tadaima Hatsuden-chū!" (Japanese: ただいま発電中！)	November 18, 2017
8	"Buzz Off!"; Transliteration: "Chīsana Shin'nyū-sha" (Japanese: 小さな侵入者)	November 25, 2017
9	"Pingu the Hero!"; Transliteration: "Pengin no Hon'nō" (Japanese: ペンギンの本能)	December 2, 2017
10	"Flower Power"; Transliteration: "Hanataba o Okurou!" (Japanese: 花束を贈ろう！)	December 9, 2017
11	"Let's Build an Igloo!"; Transliteration: "Igurū o Tsukurou!" (Japanese: イグルーを作ろう！)	December 16, 2017
12	"Pingu Saves Christmas"; Transliteration: "Santa Kurōsu no Otoshimono!?" (Japanese: サンタクロースの落とし物！？)	December 23, 2017
13	"Pingu's Magnet Muddle"; Transliteration: "Raku-chin Mashin" (Japanese: らくちんマシン)	December 30, 2017
14	"The Art of Baking"; Transliteration: "Pan de Āto!?" (Japanese: パンでアート！？)	January 13, 2018
15	"Mama's Birthday Surprise"; Transliteration: "Mama no Bāsudē" (Japanese: ママのバースデー)	January 20, 2018
16	"Pingu Takes Flight"; Transliteration: "Soratobu Pengin" (Japanese: 空飛ぶペンギン)	January 27, 2018
17	"Pingu Glides to Fame"; Transliteration: "Boku-tachi Figyua Sukētā" (Japanese: 僕たちフィギュアスケーター)	February 3, 2018
18	"Pingu Plugs a Leak"; Transliteration: "Mizu-more Chūi!" (Japanese: 水もれ注意！)	February 10, 2018
19	"Pingu and Pinga Fashionista's"; Transliteration: "Osharena Pinga" (Japanese: オシャレなピンガ)	February 17, 2018
20	"Keep It Up Pingu!"; Transliteration: "Rifutingu de Gō!" (Japanese: リフティングでゴー！)	February 24, 2018
21	"Pingu's Catch of the Day"; Transliteration: "Sakanatsuri wa Tanoshī!?" (Japanese: 魚つりは楽しい！？)	March 3, 2018
22	"Stop that Mail!"; Transliteration: "Yūbin Haitatsu wa Ōsawagi!" (Japanese: 郵便配達は大騒ぎ！)	March 10, 2018
23	"Sticking Together"; Transliteration: "Hittsuki Panikku" (Japanese: ひっつきパニック)	March 17, 2018
24	"Special Delivery for Pingu"; Transliteration: "O Tegami Todokemasu!" (Japanese: お手紙届けます！)	March 21, 2018
25	"Everyone's a Winner!"; Transliteration: "Shōri wa Dare no te ni!?" (Japanese: 勝利は誰の手に！？)	March 24, 2018
26	"Growing Pains"; Transliteration: "Hana o Sakaseyou!" (Japanese: 花を咲かせよう！)	March 31, 2018

=== Season 2 (2018–19) ===
No.	Title	Original release date
27	"Fire Fighter Training is Tough"; Transliteration: "Shōbo Kunren wa Taihen da!" (Japanese: 消防訓練は大変だ！)	October 6, 2018
28	"A Mysterious Helper"; Transliteration: "Nazo no Suketto Tōjō" (Japanese: 謎の助っ人登場)	October 13, 2018
29	"Grandfather's Here"; Transliteration: "Ojīchan Yattekita!" (Japanese: おじいちゃんがやってきた！)	October 20, 2018
30	"The Naughty Tram Passenger"; Transliteration: "Yogosu no wa Dare da!?" (Japanese: 汚すのはだれだ!?)	October 27, 2018
31	"A Mysterious Creature Appears"; Transliteration: "Nazo no Seibutsu Gen Waru!" (Japanese: 謎の生物現わる！)	November 3, 2018
32	"Pingu's Jam Session"; Transliteration: "Suteki na Seshon" (Japanese: すてきなセッション)	November 10, 2018
33	"Say Cheese"; Transliteration: "Shatā Chansu" (Japanese: シャッターチャンス)	November 17, 2018
34	"What's Inside"; Transliteration: "Nakami wa Nāni?" (Japanese: 中身はなあに？)	November 24, 2018
35	"The Big Blue Chase"; Transliteration: "Aoi Pengin o Oe!" (Japanese: 青いペンギンを追え！)	December 1, 2018
36	"Pingu's Space Adventures"; Transliteration: "Uchū wa Tanoshī Koto Bakari" (Japanese: 宇宙は楽しいことばかり！)	December 8, 2018
37	"Helping a New Friend"; Transliteration: "Yukiyama Resukyū Tai" (Japanese: 雪山レスキュー隊)	December 15, 2018
38	"Pingu and the Egg"; Transliteration: "Tamago wa Dokota?" (Japanese: たまごはどこだ？)	December 22, 2018
39	"Pingu Makes the Movie"; Transliteration: "Eiga o Tsukurou!" (Japanese: 映画を作ろう！)	December 29, 2018
40	"Pingu is a Rock Star"; Transliteration: "Sutā o Gase" (Japanese: スターをさがせ！)	January 5, 2019
41	"Household Helping Hands"; Transliteration: "Yakkai na Oetetsudai" (Japanese: やっかいなお手伝い)	January 12, 2019
42	"Pingu the Wigmaker"; Transliteration: "Fushigina Miyōin" (Japanese: 不思議な美容院)	January 19, 2019
43	"Pingu on Patrol"; Transliteration: "Tadaima Patorōru-chū" (Japanese: ただいまパトロール中！)	January 26, 2019
44	"Pingu's Frozen Discovery"; Transliteration: "Subarashī Hakken" (Japanese: すばらしい発見)	February 2, 2019
45	"Pingu's Treasure Hunt"; Transliteration: "Densetsu no Takara o Sagashidase!" (Japanese: 伝説の宝を探し出せ！)	February 9, 2019
46	"Voyage to the Moon"; Transliteration: "Sutekina Tsuki Ryokō" (Japanese: ステキな月旅行)	February 16, 2019
47	"Pingu's Traffic Dance"; Transliteration: "Odoru Kōtsū Seiri" (Japanese: 踊る交通整理)	February 23, 2019
48	"I Want to Be on TV"; Transliteration: "Terebi ni Detai!" (Japanese: テレビに出たい！)	March 2, 2019
49	"Flea Market"; Transliteration: "Furī Māketto" (Japanese: フリーマーケット)	March 9, 2019
50	"Pingu the Living Statue"; Transliteration: "Uguoku Chōkoku" (Japanese: 動く彫刻)	March 16, 2019
51	"Pingu's Snack Attack"; Transliteration: "Oyatsu o Mamore!" (Japanese: おやつを守れ！)	March 23, 2019
52	"Pingu the Conductor"; Transliteration: "Fushigina Ensō-Kai" (Japanese: 不思議な演奏会)	March 30, 2019

== Home media releases ==
Format	Title	Release date
DVD	"Pingu Becomes a Star Chef"	March 7, 2018
DVD	"Give Flower Bouquests!"	June 6, 2018
DVD	"Mail Delivery is a Big Fuss!"	June 6, 2018
DVD	"Chasing the Blue Penguin!"	March 6, 2019
DVD	"We are Patrolling Now!"	June 5, 2019
DVD	"I Want to Be on TV"	June 5, 2019
