= Grammelot =

Theatrical imitation of language

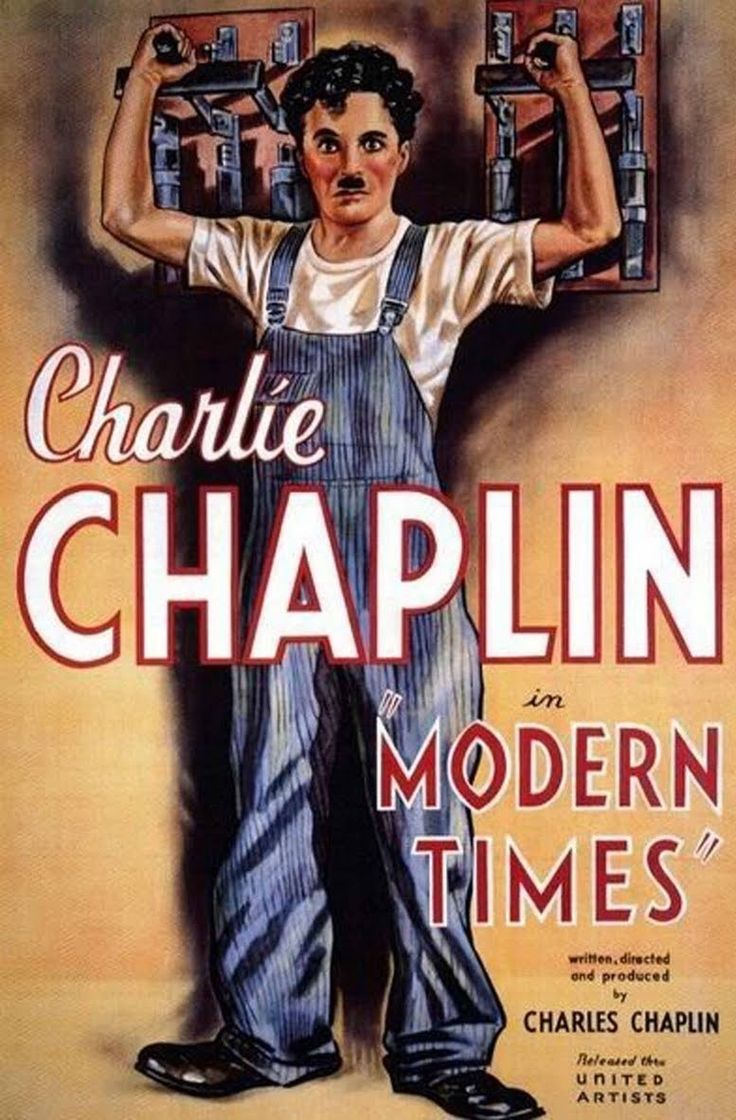
Poster for the film Modern Times, in which Charlie uses grammelot when singing "Titine"

Grammelot (/ˈɡræməlɒt/; Or gromalot or galimatias) is an imitation of language used in satirical theatre, a ad hoc gibberish that uses prosody along with macaronic (mixed-language) and onomatopoeic (sound-language) elements to convey emotional and other meaning, and used in association with mime and mimicry. The satirical use of such a format may date back to the 16th-century commedia dell'arte; the group of cognate terms appears to belong to the 20th century.

== History ==
In an essay entitled "L'art du grommelot", French scholar Claude Duneton suggests the word (not the technique) – in its French form, grommelot – has its origins in the commedia dell'arte-derived Italian theatre of the early part of the sixteenth century. Duneton studied briefly with Léon Chancerel (1886–1965), who was a major figure in this branch of theatre. Chancerel in fact uses the word in his book, Le théâtre et la jeunesse (Paris: Bourrellier 1946:47). Others, such as theatre scholar John Rudlin in Commedia dell'arte: An Actor's Handbook (London: Routledge 1994:60), suggest this origin as well.

While the historical origin of the term is unclear, it has been particularly popularized by the Nobel-winning Italian playwright Dario Fo. His 1969 show Mistero Buffo ("Comic Mystery Play") was a satirical touring performance involving sketches based on mediaeval sources, told in Fo's own grammelots constructed from Gallo-Italian languages and phonemes from modern languages (he has coined separate Italian, French and American grammelots). In his Nobel lecture, Fo referred to the 16th-century Italian playwright Ruzzante's invention of a similar language based on Italian dialects, Latin, Spanish, German and onomatopoeic sounds.

Another notable modern Italian exponent is the Milan actor/writer Gianni Ferrario. Voice actor Carlo Bonomi, also from Milan, used grammelot to voice Osvaldo Cavandoli's cartoon La Linea and many years later, outside Italy, Otmar Gutmann's Pingu. Mainstream comics have also used Grammelot-like language: for instance, Stanley Unwin. The Canadian circus and entertainment troupe Cirque du Soleil uses in its routines similar forms of language; journalists often term them "Cirquish", but Cirque du Soleil's own staff use the word "Grommelot".

Famous Grammelot also include Charlie Chaplin's faux-German in The Great Dictator and Monty Python's Knights Who Say Ni.

A modern form of Grammelot can be heard in the Despicable Me franchise, where the Minions speak a fictitious language; the language is made up of words borrowed from several languages, which make no cohesive sense, relying instead on tone and expression to convey the meaning.

== See also ==
- Asemic writing
- Double-talk
- "Ging Gang Goolie"
- "Prisencolinensinainciusol"
- Nonsense song
- Simlish
- Macaronic language
- Mixed language
- Gibberish
- Interjection
- Slang
