= Carlo Bonomi =

Italian voice actor (1937–2022)

- Bonomi at a dubbing session in 1996
- Born: 12 March 1937; Milan, Italy
- Died: 6 August 2022 (aged 85); Milan, Italy
- Occupation: Voice actor
- Years active: 1963–2008

Carlo Bonomi (12 March 1937 – 6 August 2022) was an Italian voice actor who was best known for his voiceover work as the voice of Mr. Linea in the animated series La Linea as well as Pingu and various other characters in series 1–4 of the stop-motion children's television series of the same name.

== Career ==
Bonomi voiced many characters for the Italian advertising show Carosello. The language of noises he had developed and used for the earlier Osvaldo Cavandoli's La Linea from 1971 to 1986 was reinterpreted for the acclaimed TV series Pingu on SF DRS during its first four seasons produced between 1990 and 2000, where Bonomi voiced all the characters without a script. His grammelot was originally intended to be a parody of the Milanese dialect, and it was inspired by three abstract languages traditionally used by clowns in France and Italy.

When in 2003 the show's rights were acquired by HIT Entertainment, Bonomi was replaced by London-based voice actors David Sant and Marcello Magni.

In 1984, he provided the laughter voices for the cartoon series Stripy. In 1985, he recorded the railway announcements for the central station of Milan, which remained in use until 2008. Bonomi was also very active as a voice actor in Italian radio dramas, and was the Italian voice for several popular cartoon characters, including Mickey Mouse and Fred Flintstone.

In 2008, he acted the voices for the yellow tribe in Spore, which was also his final role before his retirement from acting later that year.

== Death ==
Bonomi died on 6 August 2022 in his home town in Milan, Italy, at the age of 85.

== Filmography ==
=== Film ===
- La Linea (1972) – La Linea
- Mr. Rossi Looks for Happiness (1976) – Additional voices
- Mr. Rossi's Dreams (1977) – Additional voices
- Mr. Rossi's Vacation (1978) – Additional voices

=== Animation ===
- La Linea (1971–1986) – La Linea
- Calimero (1972–1975) – Paperazzi
- The Red and the Blue (1976-2005) – Red / Blue
- Tofffsy (1977) - Tofffsy / Otto il fantasma / Gustav il maggiordomo
- Stripy (1984) – Stripy / All characters
- Pingu (1990–2000) – All characters (voice)
- Soccer Fever (1994-1995) - Brian Thompson (elder)
- Mister Go (1996-2006) - Mr. Go / Bip / All characters
- Pingu at the Wedding Party (1997) – All characters (except the green penguins) (voice)

=== Video games ===
- Pingu: A Barrel of Fun! (1997) – Pingu, Robby
- Fun! Fun! Pingu (1999) – All characters
- Spore (2008) – Additional voices

=== Live-action ===
- Eurovision Song Contest (TV series) (1965, 1990, 1992) – Swiss Commentator (voice)
- Le mie prigioni (TV series) (1968) – Il segretario
- Ogni Regno (1969) – Narrator (voice)
- La freccia nera (TV series) (1969) – Un alabardiere
- In the Summertime (1971) – Voice dubbing (uncredited)

=== Other works ===
- Milano Centrale railway station (1985–2008) – Announcer
