= Monsieur Pointu (film) =

1975 animated film

- Directed by: André Leduc; Bernard Longpré
- Produced by: René Jodoin
- Starring: Paul Cormier
- Cinematography: Co Hoedeman
- Edited by: Claude Jobin
- Music by: Paul Cormier
- Distributed by: National Film Board of Canada
- Release date: 1975
- Running time: 12 minutes
- Country: Canada

Monsieur Pointu is a 1975 animated film about Quebec fiddler Monsieur Pointu, the stage name for Paul Cormier.

== Synopsis ==
In this 12-and-a-half-minute film, Pointu and his violin break into pieces that take on a life of their own, dancing to the artist's music.

== Production ==
The film was directed by Bernard Longpré and André Leduc and produced by René Jodoin for the National Film Board of Canada. Monsieur Pointu makes use of the pixillation technique pioneered by NFB animation studio founder Norman McLaren in Neighbours and A Chairy Tale, combined with optical effects.

== Critical reception ==
Monsieur Pointu was screened at the 1976 Festival of Animated Films in Ottawa. It was nominated for an Academy Award for Best Animated Short Film at the 48th Academy Awards.
