= List of Pingu episodes =

From 1990 to 2000, a total of 104 five-minute Pingu episodes were made at Trickfilmstudio in Russikon, Switzerland. The episodes were written by Silvio Mazzola, and were directed and animated by Otmar Gutmann using clay animation. A special twenty-five minute episode called "Pingu at the Wedding Party" (also known by its home video title A Very Special Wedding) was produced in 1997.

The British-American entertainment company, HIT Entertainment (namely known for children's TV franchises such as Bob the Builder, Barney & Friends, and Thomas the Tank Engine), bought the rights to Pingu in 2001. The series was revived from 2003 to 2006 for a further 52 episodes, with the production moved to the United Kingdom.

The characters in Pingu practice "grammelot" or "Penguinese", gibberish that imitates language and can not be translated. Episodes are not subbed or dubbed due to the lack of real language.

Regarding episode titles, the main title listed for each episode in series 1-4 originates from BBC television broadcasts and European home video releases. Where applicable, several episodes that were redubbed in the late 1990s additionally have alternative titles that were first introduced on the official Japanese DVD releases, which were subsequently translated for North American audiences. Episode titles for the revival series are taken from the European DVDs.

Some episodes may contain intense or controversial subjects, and are censored (if not banned) in certain countries. The episode titled "Pingu Runs Away", for instance, was banned on British television and was never broadcast in America.

== Series overview ==
Season	Episodes	Originally released	
Season	Episodes	First released	Last released
Original series
TA	3	1980	1986
1	26	1990	1990
2	26	1991	1994
3	26	1995	1996
Special	1	1997	
4	26	1998	2000
First revival series
5	26	1 August 2003	6 February 2004
6	26	3 January 2005	3 March 2006

== Original series ==
=== Test animations (1980–86) ===
No. overall	No. in season	Title	Production year
TA1	TA1	"Hugo"	1980
An early, 30-second short where Pingu (named Hugo at the time) evades a polar bear.
TA2	TA2	"Splatter Short"	1980
A short only seen on Otmar Gutmann's showreel where an early version of Pingu hops on a tube, accidentally splattering a tall yellow creature.
TA3	TA3	"Pingu: A Story for Kids at School"	1986
A more polished short featuring Pingu and his family from the pilot. Some of the scenes in this pilot were later reanimated for the episodes "Hello Pingu" and "Pingu Looks After the Egg".

=== Season 1 (1990) ===
No. overall	No. in season	Title	Original release date	Prod. code
1	1	"Hello Pingu" "Pingu is Introduced"	1990	S01E01
Pingu and his parents are eating their lunch one day, but Pingu doesn't want to eat his seaweed. After a comical lunch, Pingu goes outside to play with his red rubber ball, but it is stolen by two mischievous penguins named Pingo and Pingg.
2	2	"Pingu Delivers the Mail" "Pingu Helps to Deliver the Mail"	1990	S01E05
Father takes Pingu to the post office and along the way, they deliver parcels and envelopes to everyone in the South Pole.
3	3	"Pingu Looks After the Egg" "Pingu Helps With Incubating"	1990	S01E02
Pingu's family has an egg and Pingu is in charge of incubating it. His mother shows him how to incubate, and then does it on his own. He soon gets bored and decides to listen to music, causing the egg to start dancing and wreaking havoc in the igloo.
4	4	"The New Arrival" "Pinga is Born"	1990	S01E03
After being incubated for a while, the egg starts to crack. Father phones the doctor and Pingu is desperate to see his new sibling. When the egg is finally opened, it turns out to be a girl and the family decide to call her Pinga.
5	5	"Pingu Goes Fishing"	1990	S01E04
Pingu is going fishing. He manages to catch a fish, but a seal named Robby eats his bait, angering Pingu and leading to a chaotic chase. When the seal gets his flipper hurt, Pingu is remorseful and he and Robby become friends.
6	6	"Jealousy" "Pingu is Jealous"	1990	S01E06
Pingu is upset when Mother seems to ignore him while caring for his baby sister, Pinga. He tries everything to get Mother's attention, but unfortunately, he does not succeed. Mother soon makes up with a tearful Pingu.
7	7	"Hide and Seek" "Pingu and the Snowball Fight"	1990	S01E07
Pingu has a playdate with Robby. They play games around abandoned igloos and have a snowball fight.
8	8	"Barrel of Fun" "Pingu and the Avalanche Accident/Pingu and the Avalanche Incident"	1990	S01E10
Pingu and Robby are tobogganing using an old broken barrel. However, things backfire when Pingu ends up trapped inside an ice pillar. Robby goes for help and the doctor helps Pingu out of the pillar.
9	9	"Pingu Plays Fish Tennis" "Fish Tennis"	1990	S01E09
Robby brings a large fish and he and Pingu have fun playing with it. Unfortunately, it gets stuck on the washing line, but Pingu gets it down by walking on stilts.
10	10	"Skiing" "Pingu Goes Skiing/Pingu On Makeshift Skis"	1990	S01E13
Pingu is admiring his friend Pingo's fantastic new skis. He is even allowed to stand on the back of them and ski along with him. However, as they go, he spots a broken barrel and has an idea. He soon has a pair of home-made skis and they set off again. But when they start showing off, it all ends up in a heap of broken skis both old and new.
11	11	"Sledging" "Pingu's Tobogganing"	1990	S01E18
Pingu and friends Pingo and Pingg meet for a toboggan race. They all race down the mountain but Pingu's toboggan does not seem to be working properly and he just cannot keep up. Pingu knows just what to do and makes a few adjustments. However, his new speedy descent lands him up inside his snowman, and his friends have to melt him back out of it.
12	12	"Lost Baby" "Pinga is Left Out"	1990	S01E08
Pingu has a playdate with Pingo, but he has to take Pinga along. He selfishly forbids Pinga from playing with him and Pingo. As a result, Pinga runs away and Pingu and Pingo search for her, only to find her back at home.
13	13	"Ice Hockey" "Pingu Plays Ice Hockey"	1990	S01E11
Pingu and his friends, Robby and Pongi, arrive to see some professionals play ice hockey. They decide to join, but as the game progresses, the professionals suddenly become violent and display bad sportsmanship. After that, Pingu, Pongi and Robby move on to do some good clean harmless fun, like figure skating, to which the professionals join in.
14	14	"Pingu Runs Away" "Pingu Runs Away from Home"	1990	S01E14
Pingu and his parents are eating their dinner one night, but Pingu is feeling angry because he is told to eat his seaweed. After unintentionally ruining dinner, getting spanked and yelled at, Pingu runs away from home in tears thinking that his parents don't love him anymore. Pingu then sees scary carvings and becomes scared as he realised just how scary the outdoors can be at night, so he hides himself in a small cave. His parents, unhappy with how they treated their son, come looking for him. They find him in that cave frightened, where they apologise to him and return home. Note: This episode was not aired in the United Kingdom and the United States due to its upsetting themes which were deemed controversial, but is available to watch online and on home video releases.
15	15	"Building Igloos" "Pingu Builds an Igloo"	1990	S01E15
Pingu and his friend Pingo decide to build an igloo. They search for a place to build the new igloo but cannot agree on the spot. They end up fighting over the ice blocks and decide to build their own igloos. However they soon realise that the only way to succeed is by working together.
16	16	"Pingu and Pinga Stay Up" "Pingu and Pinga Don't Want to Go to Bed"	1990	S01E12
The two penguin children try everything in order not to have to go to bed. First they need to go to the loo again, then they're thirsty, then they have to have the light on, and then the door has to be left just a little bit ajar. Mother is worn out, and falls asleep on the chair. When the children see this they realize what they have done and help their mother to bed.
17	17	"Music Lessons" "Pingu Has Music Lessons From His Grandfather/Pingu Has Music Lessons"	1990	S01E16
Pingu finds an accordion in his toybox and has fun playing with it. The noise is so disturbing that Pingu is sent outside, so he goes to his paternal grandfather's house to be taught how to play the accordion.
18	18	"Little Accidents" "Pingu's Lavatory Story"	1990	S01E19
Pingu has to rush to the toilet because he drank too much. When he gets home however, Father is in the bathroom, and then when he does get in the toilet, it is simply too high. Pingu has to clean up the mess he has made, but then, with Mother's help, he manages to overcome the problem with stairs round the loo. Note: This episode was not reaired early after it initially aired, likely due to its uncensored urinating.
19	19	"School Time" "Pingu at School"	1990	S01E20
Pingu meets Robby on the way to school and Robby slips into the school ice-hole. During their lesson the class all have to dive into the ice-hole in order to find out what types of fish live beneath the ice. But Pingu 'knows' that not only fish live in the ocean and Robby catches all sorts of creatures for them to learn about.
20	20	"Pingu's Ice Cave" "Pingu in the Ice Cave"	1990	S01E17
During a game of catch with Pingo, Pingo's ball rolls out of sight. Whilst trying to retrieve it, the two friends get trapped in an ice tunnel. Although at first despairing with a little ingenuity on Pingu's part, they manage to get out and back home.
21	21	"Pingu's Dream" "Pingu Dreams/Pingu's Nightmare"	1990	S01E26
When Mother reads him a bedtime story, Pingu falls asleep and dreams about the igloo floating away like an alien spaceship and his bed walking and galloping like a horse. Pingu finds this fun, but his dream becomes bad when a giant walrus torments him. Note: This episode was placed with an unofficial ban from broadcast distribution due to the giant walrus being too frightening and haunting for too many viewers. It was also removed from British television in 2003. It was still broadcast in the United States however, and was also released on DVD in said region (Region 1), but it hasn't been released on VHS by the BBC themselves due to the major controversy towards this episode. However, the episode did manage to air once on PBS Kids Sprout in 2006.
22	22	"Grandpa is Ill" "Pingu's Grandfather is Sick"	1990	S01E21
Grandfather is sick, so Pingu and Pinga set off with their mother right away. While Mother is looking after Grandfather, brother and sister play together, but their noise and nuisance soon means their mother sends them home. There, they paint their faces to look as if they have caught Grandfather's illness and Mother comes rushing back, only to discover their trick.
23	23	"Pingu and Pinga at Home" "Pingu's Parents Go to a Concert"	1990	S01E25
Mother and Father are going out to a concert, leaving Pingu and Pinga to manage themselves. They make a mess in the igloo, but clean everything up when their parents are coming back home.
24	24	"Noise" "Pingu and His Friends Play Too Loudly"	1990	S01E24
Pingu and his friends Pingo and Pingg are playing ball. They are so excited that they do not notice how loud they are. A neighbour is annoyed at the noise the youngsters are making and keeps chasing them away, but they refuse to let themselves be driven off so easily.
25	25	"Pingu and the Barrel Organ" "Pingu and the Organ Grinder"	1990	S01E23
Pingu feels sorry for the poor organ grinder. He puts some money in his hat and wants the adult penguins to do the same but they all look the other way. Pingu takes the poor man to his run-down igloo. Then he takes the barrel-organ and plays outside the baker's, the fishmongers', the tailor's and in front of the drinks store. In turn, each shopkeeper donates some goods.
26	26	"Pingu's Circus" "Pingu and Pinga Play Circus"	1990	S01E22
Pingu, Pinga and Robby play at putting on a circus. Their performances meet with a huge applause, even though not all of them go to plan, in fact, the more they go wrong, the funnier they seem to be.

=== Season 2 (1991–94) ===
No. overall	No. in season	Title	Original release date	Prod. code
27	1	"Pingu at the Doctor's"	1991	S02E01
Pingu accidentally injures his beak while playing with Pinga, so his sister takes him to the doctor's clinic. Note: This episode was pulled from airing (except in the United Kingdom and the United States) due to the realistic appearance of blood. This episode was also originally planned to be a Season 1 episode, but it was pushed to Season 2 because of the controversy over "Little Accidents".
28	2	"Pingu's Admirer" "Pingu's Female Admirer"	1991	S02E02
A new student named Pingi arrives at Pingu's school for the first time, and much to Pingu's irritation, she has a crush on him.
29	3	"Pingu and the Seagull"	1992	S02E03
Pingu and his scooter run afoul of a mischievous seagull.
30	4	"Pingu Goes Ice Surfing" "Pingu Surfing on the Ice"	1992	S02E04
When a strong wind blows, Pingu decides to go ice surfing by using his mother's clean washing for a sail on his sledge.
31	5	"Pingu's First Kiss"	1992	S02E05
Pingu and Pingi want to have their first kiss, but their friends have other ideas.
32	6	"Pingu's Curling Game" "Pingu's Curling Party"	1992	S02E06
Pingu and Robby are curling, with Pingu using his mother's bed bottle, but a mishap ensues.
33	7	"Pingu's Family Celebrate Christmas"	1992	S02E07
Pingu's family are preparing for Christmas, much to the delight and excitement of Pingu and Pinga.
34	8	"Pingu the Icicle Musician" "Pingu as an Icicle Player"	1993	S02E08
During a game of hide-and-seek with Pingo and Robby, Pingu appears to have vanished. However, they soon hear something beautiful in a nearby cavern.
35	9	"Pingu the Chef" "Pingu as a Chef"	1993	S02E09
When Pingu and Pinga are left once more at home alone, they decide to cook up some popcorn - with chaotic results.
36	10	"Pingu Goes Away" "Pingu's Outing"	1993	S02E10
Pingu decides to visit his aunt for the weekend, but he feels homesick later on.
37	11	"Pingu the Photographer" "Pingu and the Camera"	1993	S02E11
Pingu is playing at being a photographer with his friend Robby, even managing to capture a hot air balloon on film.
38	12	"Pingu's New Kite" "Pingu's Parents Have No Time"	1993	S02E12
Pingu's kite ends up destroyed after trying to get it down from the roof. When their parents are too busy to help, they rush over to Grandfather's house.
39	13	"Pingu and the Many Packages" "Pingu and the Packaging Material"	1993	S02E13
It is Grandfather's birthday and Pingu wants buy him the best gift of all. Unfortunately, his plans foil when Pinga brings Grandfather a bigger present.
40	14	"Pingu the Conjurer's Apprentice" "Pingu the Apprentice Magician"	1993	S02E14
Pingu puts on a magic show for Pinga and Pingi, with particularly wacky results.
41	15	"Pingu's Birthday"	1993	S02E15
Pingu is celebrating his birthday with his friends.
42	16	"Pingu at the Funfair" "Pingu at the Fairground"	1993	S02E16
Pingu and his family spend a day at the local fairground, buying treats and going on rides. Things go well until Pingu goes on the boat swing.
43	17	"Pingu the Babysitter" "Pingu as Babysitter"	1993	S02E17
Mother and her sister are having their portraits done and Pingu has the job of looking after his twin cousins. But he soon realises that taking care of them is harder than expected.
44	18	"Pingu Cannot Lose"	1993	S02E18
Pingu is playing bowling with his peers. He starts off good, until he begins to lose points.
45	19	"Pingu and the Game of Fish" "Pingu and the Disabled Penguin"	1994	S02E19
Pingu and Pingo play a practical joke on several passers-by, but the joke backfires when one of them is a disabled penguin.
46	20	"Pingu Gets a Bicycle" "Pingu Gets a Bike/Pingu and the Gift"	1994	S02E20
Pinga is upset when her father accidentally drives over her toys. The household tries to cheer her up, but it backfires, until Pingu gives Pinga his scooter.
47	21	"Pingu's Visit to the Hospital" "Pingu's Hospital Visit"	1994	S02E21
Pingu and Mother visit Pinga in the hospital, who has broken her wing. It's during this time Pingu puts on a show for the whole ward.
48	22	"Pingu on the School Excursion" "Pingu on the School Trip"	1994	S02E22
Pingu's teacher takes his class to a giant whale sculpture in the works. The class causes chaos during the expedition, and things get worse when Pingg gets stranded on the sculpture.
49	23	"Pingu and Pinga at the Kindergarten" "Pingu at the Nursery/Pingu Visits the Kindergarten"	1994	S02E23
Pingu takes Pinga to her nursery school, but his friends laugh at him on the way back.
50	24	"Pingu and the Strangers"	1994	S02E24
Two new visitors come to Pingu's village, but no one makes them feel welcome. That is, until Pingu sees what they're good at.
51	25	"Pingu Helps His Mother" "Pingu Helps Around the House"	1994	S02E25
Pingu and Pinga help Mother with their household chores, with unexpected results.
52	26	"Pingu Builds a Snowman"	1994	S02E26
Pingu, Pinga and Robby want to build a giant snowman, so they use a signpost to hold it steady, unaware that a passing hiker needs it.

=== Season 3 (1995–96) ===
No. overall	No. in season	Title	Original release date	Prod. code
53	1	"Pingu Goes Cross Country Skiing" "Pingu the Cross Country Skier"	1995	S03E01
Pingu breaks his skis while messing around during cross country skiing. How could he get home now?
54	2	"Pingu at the Museum" "Pingu's Museum Visit"	1995	S03E02
Pingu and Robby cause trouble at an art museum and the curator unsuccessfully tries to rectify the damage.
55	3	"Pingu's Grandpa Comes to Stay" "Pingu's Grandfather Comes to Visit/Grandfather Comes to Visit"	1995	S03E03
Pingu and Pinga's Grandpa comes for dinner. When Dad isn't looking, Pingu and Pinga make Grandpa eat all their greens.
56	4	"Pingu's Long Journey" "Pingu's Big Trip"	1995	S03E04
Pingu goes on an expedition, but Pinga hides on the sled.
57	5	"Pingu Pretends to Be Ill"	1995	S03E05
Pingu fakes illness to get out of school but the doctor sees through his trick and tries to give him a shot, But Pingu doesn't like that one bit so he runs away to school.
58	6	"Pingu the Painter"	1995	S03E06
Pingu wants to be a painter. Bored with posing as his model, Robby goofs off and makes a mess.
59	7	"Pingu's Trick" "Pingu's Prank"	1995	S03E07
Pingu helps his neighbor and gets rewarded. When his friend tries to repeat the feat, the neighbor sees through the ploy.
60	8	"Pingu and the Mother Bird" "Pingu and the Birds' Mother"	1995	S03E08
A bird keeps stealing the fishes Pingu had. Pingu tries to stop the bird from stealing his fishes, then realises that the bird is taking his fishes because the bird wanted to feed her chicks.
61	9	"Pingu Quarrels With His Mother" "Pingu Quarrels With His Mum/Pingu Argues With His Mother"	1995	S03E09
After abandoning his chores, Pingu gets mistreated by Mother and runs away to his room crying. While eating dinner, Father isn't happy about what Mother had done to Pingu, and they begin searching for him. When they find Pingu, Mother hugs him and they both make up.
62	10	"Pingu and the Message in the Bottle" "Pingu and the Hidden Treasure"	1995	S03E10
Pingu and Pingo find a bottle containing a mysterious map, but it leads them to a common shell. Pingu is disappointed and takes the shell home, then makes a discovery.
63	11	"Pingu Has an Idea" "Pingu Helps Himself"	1995	S03E11
When Mother is sleeping, Pingu and Pinga take the record player outside, but without electricity it does not work. Seeing Father's car battery, Pingu gets an idea.
64	12	"Pingu and the Broken Vase" "Pingu Breaks a Vase"	1995	S03E12
While playing, Pingu and Pinga accidentally break their mother's vase. Pinga then tattles to Father.
65	13	"Pingu and the Paper Plane" "Pingu and the Paper Aeroplane"	1995	S03E13
A classmate throws a paper airplane at a teacher and Pingu gets blamed for it. Pingu seeks revenge on the classmate.
66	14	"Pingu Takes Revenge" "Pingu Seeks Revenge"	1996	S03E14
When Pingg teases Pingu, he seeks revenge by sawing the bridge to Pingg's house, but then Grandfather tries to cross the bridge.
67	15	"Pingu Makes a Mistake" "Pingu and the Mix Up"	1996	S03E15
Pingu doesn't pay attention when watching his neighbor's egg. It rolls off and Pingu retrieves the wrong egg.
68	16	"Pingu and the Toy"	1996	S03E16
Pingo gets a new toy car and Pingu wants one too, but it doesn't turn out as expected.
69	17	"Pingu the Superhero" "Pingu Plays Superman"	1996	S03E17
While Mother is napping, Pingu plays Superman. While trying to rescue Pinga, he falls off a chair and hurts his foot, where he ends up having to go to the hospital to get his foot healed. While they wait for the doctor to check on Pingu, Pinga plays at being a princess.
70	18	"Pingu and the Fishing Competition" "Pingu Has a Fishing Competition"	1996	S03E18
Pingu, Pingo, and Pongi have a fishing competition. Pongi has no luck, but then a miracle occurs.
71	19	"Pingu and the Letter" "Pingu Hides a Letter"	1996	S03E19
Pingu hides a letter when he hears Mother coming, as he has already opened it, and she searches everywhere for it.
72	20	"Pingu Feels Left Out" "Pingu is Not Allowed to Join in the Games"	1996	S03E20
Robby and Pingo play badminton without Pingu, making him feel left out.
73	21	"Pingu Wins First Prize" "Pingu Draws a Winner"	1996	S03E21
Pingu picks a winner when he plays the lottery.
74	22	"Pingu and the Ghost"	1996	S03E22
Pingu pretends to be a ghost to scare Pinga. Mother is not happy and sends Pingu to bed.
75	23	"Pingu and the Postcard"	1996	S03E23
Pingu and Pinga adorn themselves with flowers after seeing a South Sea postcard. Mother realizes where they got their flowers.
76	24	"Pingu's Discovery" "Pingu Makes a Discovery"	1996	S03E24
Pingu and Robby discover a figurehead while sledding and the museum director is interested.
77	25	"Pingu and the Baker" "Pingu Steals"	1996	S03E25
Pingu steals a cake from the baker and hides it from Mother. She discovers it and forces him to return to the baker.
78	26	"Pingu and the Lost Ball"	1996	S03E26
Pinga hides Pingu's ball and he assumes it was stolen.

=== Special (1997) ===
No. overall	No. in season	Title	Original release date	Prod. code
79	1	"Pingu at the Wedding Party"	1997	Special
Pingu and his family attend a wedding, but things go wrong with an absent groom, a new arrival, and a damaged gift.

=== Season 4 (1998–2000) ===
No. overall	No. in season	Title	Original release date	Prod. code
80	1	"Pingu's Disadvantage"	1998	S04E01
Pingu keeps losing hide and seek and climbs up to find them easier.
81	2	"Pingu Refuses to Help"	1998	S04E02
Pingu acts selfish and gets left out when his family hangs the washing together.
82	3	"Pingu the Mountaineer"	1998	S04E03
Pingu convinces Father to go mountain climbing, but gets tired as they go higher.
83	4	"Pingu and the Big Fish"	1998	S04E04
Pingu goes fishing and promises to be home in time for dinner, but forgets his promise after meeting a friend.
84	5	"Pingu Shows What He Can Do"	1998	S04E05
Pingu and Pinga play with toys, but when Pingi arrives, he tries to act cool by not playing with toys.
85	6	"Pingu Clears the Snow"	1998	S04E06
Pingu tries to keep snow off Father's car.
86	7	"Pingu Has a Day Off"	1998	S04E07
Pingu has a day off and refuses to help Mother.
87	8	"Pingu the Archer"	1998	S04E08
Pingu finds a bow and arrow.
88	9	"Pingu Gets a Warning"	1998	S04E09
Pingu ignores a warning about flying a kite near his grouchy neighbor's house.
89	10	"Pingu and the Magnet"	1998	S040
Pingu uses a magnet to trick his friend and cheat in a game with a metal ball.
90	11	"Pingu Gets Help"	1998	S04E11
Pingu's boat keeps sinking due to a leaky hull, and he gets stranded.
91	12	"Pingu in Paradise"	1998	S04E12
Pingu has a dream after playing hide and seek with Pinga.
92	13	"Pingu's Dangerous Joke"	1999	S04E13
Pingu plays a dangerous trick on Grandfather.
93	14	"Pingu the Pilot"	1999	S04E14
Pingu and Pinga see a plane fly over their igloo and want to build their own.
94	15	"Pingu Teases Pinga"	1999	S04E15
Pingu plays tricks on Pinga endlessly, so Father teaches him a lesson.
95	16	"Pingu's Wish"	1999	S04E16
Pingu wishes for a magic kit in a shop and his parents make it come true.
96	17	"Pingu is Curious"	1999	S04E17
Pingu gets a big present on his birthday but is forced to wait, and he tries to figure out what's inside.
97	18	"Pingu Gets Organised" "Pingu Gets Organized"	1999	S04E18
Pingu's Father pressures him to be organized.
98	19	"Pingu Builds a Tower"	2000	S04E19
Pingu sees a picture of a tower and wants to build one. Unfortunately, Pinga ruins the base of his tower.
99	20	"Pingu the King"	2000	S04E20
Pingu sees a book about kingdoms and wants to be a king. He starts ordering his friends around like servants and gets abandoned.
100	21	"Pingu the Baker"	2000	S04E21
Pingu accidentally adds too much baking powder to a cake he is baking.
101	22	"Pingu and the Doll"	2000	S04E22
The arm on Pinga's teddy bear comes off and Pingu covers up his role, while the toy gets repaired.
102	23	"Pingu Helps Grandfather"	2000	S04E23
Pingu is reading a comic, Mother is knitting, Father is reading the newspaper and Pinga is playing doctors until Grandfather phones explaining he hurt his flipper. With Mother, Father and Pinga delaying themselves, Pingu is left to go and help out.
103	24	"Pingu Has a Bad Day" "Pingu On a Bad Day"	2000	S04E24
Pingu has a bad day in which he trips on toys, has a bad trip to school, and cannot answer the questions.
104	25	"Pingu Loses the Bet"	2000	S04E25
Pingu bets Pinga that he can shoot balls at a can better than her, but Pinga improves.
105	26	"Pingu and His Cup"	2000	S04E26
Pingu does poorly on sports day, then stops to help a friend.

== First revival series ==
=== Season 5 (2003–04) ===
No. overall	No. in season	Title	Original release date	Prod. code
106	1	"Pingu's Bouncy Fun" "Pingu's Bouncy Day Fun/Bouncy Fun"	1 August 2003	S05E03
Pingu wants to jump everywhere, but all the places he jumps aren't exactly practical, so to fix things, Father helps Pingu build a trampoline so that they can all have fun jumping on the trampoline.
107	2	"Pingu Finishes the Job"	8 August 2003	S05E08
Pingu is left in Father's tool shed and can't resist finishing the table.
108	3	"Pingu Digs a Hole"	15 August 2003	S05E07
Father uses a shovel to get snow off his car, and Pingu digs tunnels around the neighborhood.
109	4	"Pingi's Valentine Card"	22 August 2003	S05E01
Pingu is ecstatic upon receiving a Valentine card from Pingi and makes one of his own.
110	5	"Pingu Wants to Fly"	29 August 2003	S05E06
A seagull inspires Pingu to fly, and his chance comes when he buys helium balloons.
111	6	"Pingu's Windy Day"	5 September 2003	S05E05
Pingu and Pinga hang the washing on a windy day and wind catches the towels.
112	7	"Pinga's Lost Rabbit"	12 September 2003	S05E04
Pingu puts Pinga's toy rabbit out of her reach and it tumbles out the window. When he fetches it, it lands on his sled and slides away.
113	8	"Pingu's Moon Adventure"	19 September 2003	S05E10
Grandfather tells Pingu about the moon. He wants to visit, so he builds a makeshift rocket out of a barrel, tin foil, and snow.
114	9	"Pinga Sleepwalks"	26 September 2003	S05E02
Pingu follows Pinga when she sleepwalks out of the igloo.
115	10	"Pingu the Snowboarder" "Robby the Snowboarder"	15 January 2004	S05E09
When Pingu goes snowboarding, he wishes he could jump like Robby. Pingi teaches him how.
116	11	"Pinga Has Hiccups"	16 January 2004	S05E12
Pingu tries to scare Pinga to make her hiccups go away.
117	12	"Like Father Like Pingu"	19 January 2004	S05E13
Father takes Pingu on a fishing trip.
118	13	"Pingu's Ice Sculpture" "Pingu's Ice Sculptures"	20 January 2004	S05E14
In an ice sculpting contest, Pingu throws a snowball at Robby's sculpture, messing it up. He starts a grotesque sculpture competition.
119	14	"Pinga's Balloon"	21 January 2004	S05E15
Pinga's balloon needs inflating, and Pingu sees it is difficult.
120	15	"Pingu and the Knitting Machine"	22 January 2004	S05E17
When Mother rests, Pingu plays with her knitting machine.
121	16	"Pingu's Balancing Act"	23 January 2004	S05E22
Robby is good at balancing fish on his nose, and Pingu tries emulating him.
122	17	"Pingu Gets Lost"	26 January 2004	S05E23
Pinga is not well and Mother has run out of milk and she is too busy. So, Pingu offers to get some more milk until he gets lost in a maze.
123	18	"Pingu and Pinga Go Camping"	27 January 2004	S05E11
Pingu and Pinga camp overnight and Pingu scares Pinga by pretending her toy bunny is growling, but later gets scared himself.
124	19	"Stinky Pingu"	28 January 2004	S05E25
Pingu dislikes the smell of Mother's fish porridge and hides it in his backpack. While out, he becomes dirty and smelly.
125	20	"Pingu and the Band"	29 January 2004	S05E16
Pingu and Pinga drive Mother crazy by banging surfaces as drums. Grandfather teaches them real music.
126	21	"Pingu and the Snowball"	30 January 2004	S05E26
Pingu discovers that the more he rolls his snowballs, the bigger they become.
127	22	"Pingu's Stick Up" "Pingu Sticks Up"	2 February 2004	S05E20
Pingu and Pinga find stickers in their cereal box and start labeling things.
128	23	"Pingu and the Doorbell"	3 February 2004	S05E21
Pingu breaks the doorbell after Mother tells him not to play with it.
129	24	"Pingu Plays Tag"	4 February 2004	S05E19
Pingu plays tag with Pinga and gets stuck while escaping.
130	25	"Pingu's Pancakes"	5 February 2004	S05E24
Pingu tries to make pancakes but ignores Mother's advice.
131	26	"Pingu's Bedtime Shadows"	6 February 2004	S05E18
In bed, Pingu and Pinga make shadows on their bedroom wall.

=== Season 6 (2005–06) ===
No. overall	No. in season	Title	Original release date	Prod. code
132	1	"Pingu's Sledge Academy"	3 January 2005	S06E05
Pingu doesn't want to attend the uncool Sledge Academy until Father intervenes.
133	2	"Pingu and the Hose"	4 January 2005	S06E01
Pingu realizes he can throw his voice using a hose and funnel, playing tricks on his family.
134	3	"Pottery Pingu"	5 January 2005	S06E02
Pingu tries to emulate Grandfather's pottery but makes a mess.
135	4	"Pingu and the Litter"	6 January 2005	S06E04
At the snack stall, Pingu drops his wrapper and everyone copies him.
136	5	"Mother's New Hat"	7 January 2005	S06E03
Pingu and Pinga ruin Mother's new hat and try to fix it.
137	6	"Poor Pinga"	10 January 2005	S06E06
Pinga has chicken pox. Pingu calls the doctor and gets Pinga a wet cloth, milk, a hat, and biscuits. Then, he gets sick and the doctor gives him and Pinga a lollipop.
138	7	"Pinga in a Box"	11 January 2005	S06E07
Pinga is playing jack in a box until she gets onto the motorbike and Pingu has to get her.
139	8	"Pingu and the Present"	12 January 2005	S06E08
It's the birthday of one of Pingu's friends. He goes to the toy shop and buys an airplane but has to take Pinga with him.
140	9	"Pingu and the Toy Shop"	13 January 2005	S06E12
Pingu uses a pogo stick to reach a red rocket in a toy shop.
141	10	"Pingu and the Paper Mache"	14 January 2005	S06E09
Pingu's teacher shows the class how to make paper mache shapes, but chaos ensues when he leaves them unsupervised.
142	11	"Sore Tummy Pingu"	24 November 2005	S06E10
Pingu eats too many fish snacks and takes Pinga and Grandfather's, then gets a sore tummy and Grandfather takes him to the hospital.
143	12	"Pingu Gets Carried Away"	25 November 2005	S06E11
During a driving lesson, Pingu breaks the speed stick and the snowmobile gets out of control.
144	13	"Pingu and the School Pet"	28 November 2005	S06E13
Pingu must look after the school pet, a crab. When Father throws it turn into a fishing hole for pinching him, Pingu must find a replacement.
145	14	"Pampering Pingu"	29 November 2005	S06E14
Pingu is forced to accompany Mother to the beauty parlor until he gets pampered and he is not happy.
146	15	"Green Eyed Pingu"	30 November 2005	S06E17
Pingi seems to prefer playing with Pingg over Pingu, and the boys get into a contest.
147	16	"Pingu Wraps Up"	1 December 2005	S06E15
Pingu and Pinga are playing and Mother tells them to be careful until Pinga hurts her flipper.
148	17	"Pingu and the Fish Flute"	2 December 2005	S06E16
Nobody appreciates Pingu's flute playing except the fish.
149	18	"Pingu Boogaloo"	21 February 2006	S06E25
Pingu loves a new song on the radio, but it keeps getting turned off.
150	19	"Pingu and the Daily Igloo"	22 February 2006	S06E20
Pingu rushes through a delivery route and delivers the wrong newspapers.
151	20	"Pingu and the Rubberband Plane"	23 February 2006	S06E26
Pingu swaps rubber bands to make a rubber band plane fly further, causing chaos.
152	21	"Pingu and the Braces"	24 February 2006	S06E19
Pingu and Pingg play with Grandfather's braces and make a mess, so they make up for it by taking a parcel to the office for him.
153	22	"Pingu's Big Catch"	27 February 2006	S06E18
Pingu promises to catch a big fish for Mother, but has bad luck.
154	23	"Pingu and the New Scooter"	28 February 2006	S06E22
Pingg buys a new scooter first, so Pingu instead decides to make his rusty old scooter even better.
155	24	"Pingu and the Paint"	1 March 2006	S06E21
Pingu is painting but accidentally spills red paint, then ends up painting the whole town red.
156	25	"Pingu Makes a Big Splash"	2 March 2006	S06E23
Pingu and Pinga are at the swimming pool until Pingu does something dangerous as his Father told him not to.
157	26	"Pingu and the Abominable Snowman"	3 March 2006	S06E24
Pingu creates giant footprints to make Pinga think there is an abominable snowman. But there really is an abominable snowman following Pingu.

== Music video ==
- "7-11" (by Eskimo Disco) (2006)

== Notes ==
In the United Kingdom, the BBC appears to have never broadcast any of the normal 5-minute episodes from the second half of series 3 or from series 4. However, the unaired series 3 episodes have been featured on BBC produced videos. Of the episodes that have been broadcast, all have been broadcast since 4 September 2006 inclusive. 156 episodes, including Pingu at the Wedding Party have since been released on DVD by HIT Entertainment in the United Kingdom.
