= Kiss the Bride Goodbye =

- Jimmy Hanley and Patricia Medina
- Directed by: Paul L. Stein
- Written by: Jack Whittingham
- Produced by: Paul L. Stein
- Starring: Patricia Medina; Jimmy Hanley; Marie Lohr
- Cinematography: Geoffrey Faithfull
- Edited by: Ted Richards
- Music by: Percival Mackey
- Production company: Butcher's Film Service
- Distributed by: Butcher's Film Service
- Release date: 29 January 1945
- Running time: 89 minutes
- Country: United Kingdom
- Language: English

Kiss the Bride Goodbye is a 1945 British romantic comedy drama film directed by Paul L. Stein and starring Patricia Medina and Jimmy Hanley.

== Plot ==
Factory girl Joan Dodd and Jack Fowler are in love and expect to marry in due course. When Jack is called up for war service, Joan's socially-ambitious mother seizes the chance to encourage the attentions of Joan's older boss Adolphus Pickering, who is infatuated with her. Pickering proposes marriage and, under pressure from her mother, Joan accepts.

The preparations for the marriage are under way when Jack returns unexpectedly on leave from the army. He visits Joan, and her mother hides him in another room whilst Joan's suitor arrives to request her father's permission to marry Joan. On the morning of the wedding, Joan finds out that Jack is back and tried to see her, so decides to go and explain to Jack. On speaking to Jack's mother, she finds he's already left for the station to go to Scotland, so rushes to catch him. While Joan is still on the train talking to Jack, the train sets off. The pair decide to visit Joan's aunt and uncle in another area, and they assume that she and Jack are just married, and prepare a bridal chamber for the couple, much to their embarrassment. Comic misunderstandings ensue all round, until Joan finally insists on the right to marry the man of her choice.

== Cast ==
- Patricia Medina as Joan Dodd
- Jimmy Hanley as Jack Fowler
- Marie Lohr as Emma Blood
- Frederick Leister as Capt. Blood
- Jean Simmons as Molly Dodd
- Ellen Pollock as Gladys Dodd
- Wylie Watson as David Dodd
- Claud Allister as Adolphus Pickering
- Muriel George as Mrs. Fowler
- Irene Handl as Mrs. Victory
- Hay Petrie as Fraser
- Aubrey Mallalieu as Reverend Glory
- C. Denier Warren as reporter

== Production ==
The film was shot at the Riverside Studios in Hammersmith. The sets were designed by the art director James Carter.

== Reception ==
The Monthly Film Bulletin wrote: "In spite of the worn-out central theme, leading to usual sort of jokes, this is a well-acted and directed comedy, with a strong supporting cast, and it will doubtless amuse many people."

In British Sound Films: The Studio Years 1928–1959 David Quinlan rated the film as "average", writing: "Broad romantic farce but well played."

Leslie Halliwell said: "Unsubtle family farce."

The Film Report said "there are many laughs and few dull moments", but also found some of the humour on the risqué side: "The situations at times come very near the edge and there are many suggestive lines".

== Survival ==
The subsequent history of the film is unclear. There was a record of a TV showing in the U.S. in 1953. The British Film Institute had been unable to locate a print for inclusion in the BFI National Archive and classed the film as "missing, believed lost". Due to its interest as a populist production of its time and as a lost Simmons appearance, as well as increasing appreciation from film historians of Stein's directorial output in Britain, the film is included on the BFI's "75 Most Wanted" list of missing British feature films.

The Huntley Film Archives posted a clip on their official YouTube channel, claiming to have a copy of the entire feature. In 2013 Renown Pictures Ltd released a DVD of the film.
