= Pingu =

Animated children's television series

- Genre: Animated sitcom; Children's television series; Comedy
- Created by: Otmar Gutmann; Erika Brueggemann
- Written by: Erika Brueggemann; Silvio Mazzola
- Voices of: Carlo Bonomi; David Sant; Marcello Magni
- Composers: Antonio Conde (1990–1994); Andy Benedict (1995–2000); Keith Hopwood (2003–2006)
- Countries of origin: Switzerland (original); United Kingdom (revival)
- Original language: German Grammelot
- No. of series: 6
- No. of episodes: 156 (+1 special) (list of episodes)

Production
- Executive producers: Theresa Plummer-Andrews (2003–2006); Jocelyn Stevenson (2003–2006); Christopher Skala (2005–2006)
- Producers: Otmar Gutmann (1990–1993); Seishi Katto (1993–2000); Javier Garcia (1993–2000); Jackie Cockle (2003–2006); Bella Reekie (2003–2006)
- Running time: 5 minutes; 25 minutes (special)
- Production companies: Pingu Filmstudio (Note: Formerly known as Trickfilmstudio Otmar Gutmann for series 1–2.) (original); Hot Animation (revival); HIT Entertainment (revival)

Original release
- Network: SF DRS (Switzerland); ZDF (Germany)
- Release: 7 March 1990 – 9 April 2000
- Network: CBeebies
- Release: 1 August 2003 – 3 March 2006

Related
- Pingu in the City

Pingu is a stop motion animated children's television series originally produced in Switzerland. It was co-created by Otmar Gutmann and Erika Brueggemann. It centres on the titular anthropomorphic emperor penguin and his family, who live in the South Pole. The series aired on SF DRS for four series from 7 March 1990 to 9 April 2000, and was produced by the Swiss animation studio Pingu Filmstudio; with Swiss toy company Editoy AG, and later on, Pingu BV handling IP ownership of the series.

The series has been popular outside of Switzerland, particularly in the United Kingdom and Japan, in part due to its lack of a real spoken language. Nearly all dialogue is in an invented grammelot "penguin language" referred to as 'Penguinese' or 'Pinguish', consisting of babbling, muttering, and the titular character's characteristic sporadic honking sound, which can be popularly recognized as "Noot noot!" or other variants, accompanied by turning his beak into a megaphone-like shape.

After English children's company HIT Entertainment purchased Pingu BV in 2001, they produced a revival run of Pingu for two additional series in the United Kingdom through their in-house studio Hot Animation, which aired on CBeebies from 1 August 2003 to 3 March 2006. It was nominated for a BAFTA award in 2005. The characters were jointly voiced by David Sant and Marcello Magni. A computer-animated spin-off series with two seasons produced in Japan for NHK, entitled Pingu in the City, aired from 7 October 2017 to 30 March 2019. A second revival series, being animated in stop-motion like the original, is currently under development at Mattel Studios and Aardman Animations.

The IP rights to Pingu are currently held by an entity owned by HIT/Mattel named Joker, Inc., which is usually called through its trade name "The Pygos Group" on copyright and trademark notices related to the Pingu property.

== Premise ==
The program is set in Antarctica and focuses around penguin families living and working in igloos. The main character, Pingu, belongs to one such family. He frequently goes on adventures with his little sister, Pinga, and often gets into mischief with his best friend, Robby, and his love interest, Pingi. In the first four series, all the characters were performed by Italian voice actor Carlo Bonomi, using a language of sounds he had already developed and used earlier for Osvaldo Cavandoli's La Linea.

== Episodes ==
Season	Episodes	Originally released	
Season	Episodes	First released	Last released
Original series
TA	3	1980	1986
1	26	1990	1990
2	26	1991	1994
3	26	1995	1996
Special	1	1997	
4	26	1998	2000
First revival series
5	26	1 August 2003	6 February 2004
6	26	3 January 2005	3 March 2006

== Characters ==
Clockwise from top left: Pingu, Pinga, Pingo, Robby

=== Main ===
- Pingu is the show's main character—a typically playful, curious little penguin. His name comes from the German word for penguin, Pinguin. He is stubborn and mostly well-behaved, but prone to making mischief and throwing occasional tantrums.
- Pinga is Pingu's little sister. She resembles an emperor penguin chick, as do other young penguins throughout the show. She is happy and playful, but very sensitive and clever, and often a target for Pingu's pranks.
- Mr. and Mrs. Penguin are Pingu and Pinga's parents (their actual names are not revealed). Mr. Penguin is a postman who uses a non-smoking pipe in the early episodes but quits later. He is a short-tempered but loving penguin and has a motorised sledge to deliver the mail, sometimes with Pingu's help. Mrs. Penguin is a caring, loving, and hard-working housewife who spends most of her time cooking and cleaning. She sometimes gets help from Pingu and Pinga, and always gives them a cuddle when they have learned a lesson.
- Grandfather is Pingu and Pinga's paternal grandfather, who first appeared in the episode "Music Lessons". He is an expert accordionist, as he demonstrates to Pingu in that episode, and also a former professional weight lifter.

=== Recurring ===
- Robby is a seal who is Pingu's best friend. His name comes from the German word for seal, Robbe. First appearing in the episode "Pingu Goes Fishing", he is friendly and playful, yet cheeky in many ways. He is bluish grey in the first four series, and light grey in the last two.
- Pingo is a somewhat foolhardy penguin. He has a long beak that is essentially flat at the bottom but slightly rounded on the top and a head that is wider and taller. He often persuades Pingu to do wild and silly things with him. He was originally a bully in the first episode, but later he became Pingg's and Pingu's friend.
- Pingg is Pingu's other penguin friend. He also has a long beak, but a shorter head than Pingo. Like Pingo, he was originally a bully, but later became one of Pingu's friends.
- Pongi is a penguin who wears glasses and has a short round beak. He first appeared in the episode "Ice Hockey".
- Pengy is a penguin very similar to Adélie penguins and first appears in "Pingu and the School Excursion". In the episode "School Time", Pingu resembles Pengy.
- Pingj is a green penguin who appears in Pingu at the Wedding Party. He speaks with an accent that seems typical of his breed.
- Punki is a penguin who first appeared in the episode "Pingu Delivers the Mail". He has a tuft on his head and wears striped trousers.
- Bajoo is Pingu's other non-penguin friend. HIT Entertainment reveals him as a strange newcomer to the Antarctic in the appearance of a yeti. He was introduced in 2005 and appeared in the last episode, "Pingu and the Abominable Snowman". He also appeared in the 7–11 music video and The Pingu Show.
- Pingi is Pingu's love interest and Pinga's best friend. She has thick white eyelashes and a somewhat flattened beak. She first appeared in the episode "Pingu's Admirer".

=== Supporting ===
- Mr. Peng-Chips is Pingu's teacher. He lives at the local school and rings the bell when it is time for school to begin or end. He first appeared in the episode "School Time".
- Mr. Peng-Hoven is a poor penguin who lives in a tattered igloo and frequently receives Pingu's acts of kindness. He first appeared in the episode "Pingu and the Barrel Organ".
- The Aunts are Mrs. Penguin's sisters and Pingu and Pinga's three maternal aunts. In "Pingu Goes Away", Pingu goes to stay with one of his aunts. In "Pingu the Babysitter", he cares for another aunt's twin chicks whilst she and Mother go out; then in "Pingu Makes a Mistake", he cares for the third aunt's egg, which is due to hatch.
- The Twins are Pingu and Pinga's cousins. They appear in "Pingu the Babysitter", where Pingu cared for them when their mother goes out with his mother.
- Grandpa is Pingu and Pinga's maternal grandfather who appeared in "Grandpa is Ill" and "Pingu Cannot Lose"; in the latter, he is shown to be good at bowling.

== Production history ==
In 1984, Erika Brueggemann was working at Schweizer Fernsehen (the German-speaking division of SRG SSR) when she was introduced to animator Otmar Gutmann. Gutmann pitched a clay animation show starring sea lions who crawled around in a funny way. Erika Brueggemann liked the idea of a clay cartoon character, but she preferred the clay penguins that Gutmann had made. She suggested that the main character should walk upright like a human and asked, "Why not a penguin?"

Brueggemann's colleague, Guido Steiger, agreed with her idea. Gutmann was not immediately convinced, since he had already created many sea lion characters out of plasticine, but he eventually pushed forward with the penguin idea too. According to Erika Brueggemann, she gave "countless demonstrations on my part about how 'my' penguin had to move and act". From this framework, Brueggemann, Gutmann and their team created a seven-minute pilot, "Pingu: Eine Geschichte Für Kinder Im Vorschulalter", which was finished in 1986.

The pilot was screened at the 1987 Berlin Film Festival, where it won the Kleiner Baer award. Its positive reception persuaded the director of Schweizer Fernsehen, Ulrich Kündig, to commission an entire series of Pingu cartoons.

The series began production in 1988 and started airing on SF DRS from 1990–2000, originally consisting of 104 five-minute episodes and one special 25-minute episode. The original stories were written by Brueggemann and Guido Steiger, and some of the later stories were written by Silvio Mazzola. These episodes were animated at Trickfilmstudio in Russikon, Switzerland. In the styling of voices, a retroscript was chosen, and all voices were performed by Italian voice actor Carlo Bonomi without a script, using a language of noises he had already developed and used for Osvaldo Cavandoli's La Linea. This feature enabled people of diverse linguistic backgrounds to follow the story.

In 1993, David Hasselhoff released a single titled "Pingu Dance", a rap song (in Switzerland only) based on the Pingu shorts and featuring samples of Penguinese. A portion of the song is used as the theme to Pingu in the third and fourth series, as well as the re-dubs of the first two series. It was also heard in the re-dubbed version of the episode "Pingu Looks After the Egg" (retitled "Pingu Helps with Incubating"), replacing the "Woodpeckers from Space" song from the original version.

A special 25-minute episode, Pingu at the Wedding Party, was also produced in 1997 and introduced a family of green penguins.

=== HIT Entertainment buyout ===
On 29 October 2001, HIT Entertainment bought the rights to the series, including the original 104 episodes and the wedding special, for £15.9 million. HIT later revived the show and produced a further 52 episodes from 2003–2006. These episodes were animated through stop motion like the original, but used resin casts of the original clay puppets, which had deteriorated by this time.

The HIT Entertainment episodes were made by a completely new team at HOT Animation, but co-creator Erika Brueggemann still traveled to the company's headquarters in the United Kingdom to check on production. At the time, she said, "Last year a production company from England bought everything... I traveled to Manchester last summer and met their highly motivated team who worked with great commitment, humor and responsibility towards children. I think Pingu is in good hands now."

Contrary to some sources, there was never any CGI used in these later episodes. When HIT Entertainment bought the rights, Carlo Bonomi was replaced with new voice actors Marcello Magni and David Sant. Magni and Sant, Italian and Spanish actors based in London, both had mime and clowning backgrounds and were already aware of the clown language grammelot, on which the penguin language was based.

In February 2012, Mattel acquired Pingu through its purchase of HIT Entertainment which was rebranded to Mattel Television shortly after.

=== Japanese popularity and Pingu in the City ===
From its debut in the country in 1992, Pingu became well known in Japan. According to writer Silvio Mazzola in 1996, Pingu was most popular with high-school girls, with over 90% of Japanese girls aged 13–17 knowing about it. In 2020, an exhibition event commemorating the 40th anniversary of the original "Hugo" animation was held in Tokyo. Pingu currently airs as part of NHK's children's program Nyanchu's World, and also on Cartoon Network Japan. Various merchandise exclusive to the country has been created, including tie-in toys with KFC and Mister Donut, as well as various video games.

A Japanese-produced reboot of the series, titled Pingu in the City, was announced in 2017. It premiered on NHK-E on 7 October 2017. Unlike its previous series, it is computer-animated, and features Pingu and his family moving to a big city. Each episode involves Pingu attempting to help out anyone there with their jobs, although he usually messes it up. The series was produced by Polygon Pictures in the same style of the original stop motion series through computer animation. It was directed by Naomi Iwata and written by both Kimiko Ueno and Shigenori Tanabe, with music done by Ken Arai. It features voices by Ryota Iwasaki and Fumiya Tanaka, in a similar style to Carlo Bonomi, David Sant, and Marcello Magni.

=== Second revival ===
On 21 October 2024, it was announced that a remake of the series was being co-developed by Aardman Animations and Mattel Television.

== Appearances ==
Pingu appeared in The Official BBC Children in Need Medley in 2009.

In the 2014 John Lewis Christmas advert, Monty the Penguin, Sam and his pet penguin Monty watch Pingu on the television.

== Reception ==
Pingu has received mostly positive reviews. Common Sense Media gave it 4 out of 5 stars, stating: "Parents need to know that this claymation series is funny, endearing, and entertaining. Although [it] is appropriate for all ages, the plots might be difficult for the youngest viewers to follow". According to a 2008 Slate article, the series is "an international sensation", but still remains obscure among American audiences.

=== Internet popularity ===
Pingu has been the subject of various internet memes online. In 2012, a fan film called Pingu's The Thing, a crossover with John Carpenter's The Thing by animator Lee Hardcastle, went viral on release and again over the following years. In 2022, a viral animation involving Pingu doing his trademark "Noot noot!" before staring off into the distance as the "Lacrimosa" section of Mozart's Requiem plays in the background gained popularity, using the choir symphony to depict feelings of terror and dread.
