= Admag =

Alternative to commercial advertising on ITV in the United Kingdom

Admags or ad mags (short for Advertising magazines) were an early alternative to the commercial break in the 1950s and 1960s, broadcast on the new commercial network ITV in the United Kingdom. Beginning as a result of the Television Act 1954, and designed mainly to provide advertising space for smaller companies which couldn't afford slots during regular ad breaks, admags became popular in their own right. Each had a loose story format, much like a soap opera, with each episode featuring a collection of commercially available products.

== Programming ==
=== Jim's Inn ===
Jim's Inn has been one of the most popular admags; being a soap opera starring Jimmy and Maggie Hanley. The show integrated products into well-written storylines.

By 1957, Jim's Inn had become so popular that Associated-Rediffusion claimed that it was now rivalling the popularity of long-established programmes on the BBC, such as The Archers. Jim's Inn ran for 300 editions and, after the ban on admags in 1963, the couple appeared running "Jim's Stores" in similar advertisements for Daz washing powder.

=== Elizabeth Goes Shopping ===
The first of the admags, Elizabeth Goes Shopping was hosted by Elizabeth Allan, who would visit upmarket London stores.

=== Other admags ===
Other admags included About Homes and Gardens (1956), Bazaar (1957–1959), Fancy That! (1956), For Pete's Sake (1957–1958), Girl With a Date and Home With Joy Shelton (1955–1956).

=== Abroad ===
Rhodesia Television also had admags, lasting at least ten minutes in length, at the time of its inception in 1960. This format was also adopted by Trinidad and Tobago Television upon its launch in 1962.

== Ban ==
Parliament banned admags in 1963 after a 1962 report by Sir Harry Pilkington into the practices of the nascent ITV network which condemned the format. Product placement would not be allowed again on British television until 2011.

== See also ==
- Product placement
- Infomercial
- Subliminal advertising
- History of ITV
- Carosello
