= Significant Other (TV series) =

British television series

- Created by: Dana Modan; Assi Cohen; Ram Nehari
- Screenplay by: Dana Fainaru; Hamish Wright
- Directed by: David Sant
- Starring: Katherine Parkinson; Youssef Kerkour
- Country of origin: United Kingdom
- Original language: English
- No. of series: 1
- No. of episodes: 6

Production
- Executive producers: Dana Fainaru; Hamish Wright; Nicola Shindler
- Producer: Debbie Pisani
- Production company: Quay Street Productions

Original release
- Network: ITVX
- Release: 8 June 2023

Significant Other is a British comedy drama television series made by Quay Street Productions for ITVX starring Katherine Parkinson and Youssef Kerkour.

== Synopsis ==
Anna, who has given up on love, and Sam, a recently separated father of two, are neighbours who begin a hesitant relationship after being brought close to each other by dramatic life events. It opens with Sam taking an overdose but being interrupted by Anna at his door. She says she is having a heart attack and must wait with someone until the ambulance arrives.

== Cast ==
- Katherine Parkinson as Anna
- Youssef Kerkour as Sam
- Mark Heap as Ray
- Kelle Bryan as Shelley
- Ben Bailey Smith as Damien
- Sue Vincent as Gina
- Shaun Williamson as Jonny
- Olivia Poulet as Cathy
- Naledi Rapotu as Chloe
- Eddison Burch as Malik

== Production ==
The six-part series is adapted from yes Studios' Israeli series of the same name, created by Dana Modan, Assi Cohen and Ram Nehari. It has been adapted and written by Dana Fainaru, and Hamish Wright, who also serve as executive producers alongside Nicola Shindler. David Sant is director and Debbie Pisani is series producer.

=== Casting ===
In August 2022 Katherine Parkinson and Youssef Kerkour were announced as the lead actors in the series. In November 2022 Mark Heap joined the cast. That same month Ben Bailey Smith, Kelle Bryan and Shaun Williamson were added to the cast.

=== Filming ===
Principal photography took place in Manchester, England in the autumn of 2022. Filming locations include the Y Club at Castlefield and Ducie Street, near Piccadilly Station.

== Release ==
The series premiered in the United Kingdom on ITVX on 8 June 2023, before being broadcast on ITV1 on 8 January 2024.

It aired in Australia on SBS Television and SBS on Demand from 25 October 2023.
