= Die Schlacht um Miggershausen =

- Directed by: Georg Woelz
- Screenplay by: Paul Schwärzel
- Based on: Original story
- Music by: Karl Sczuka
- Release date: 1937
- Running time: 13 minutes
- Country: Germany
- Language: German

Die Schlacht um Miggershausen (English: The Battle for Miggershausen) is a short 13-minute animated film made in 1937. It was written by Paul Schwärzel and directed by Georg Woelz with Karl Sczuka composing the music and Heinz Goedecke providing the voice.

== Plot ==
The animation begins with an anthropomorphic house checking the date in his diary and starting an inventory of produce from several towns. The town of Miggershausen is producing less than anywhere else and so a radio with human characteristics starts checking a map for the location of this town. We are shown images of a very run-down desolate place: the cow being milked only produces one drop of milk, the chicken's egg is so minuscule you need a magnifying glass to see it, and the animals' water trough is so contaminated it is seriously harming the animals. News of the inferiority of this town travels fast and we see a group of men in a pub reading the paper and laughing. The radio decides that something must be done and so he sets of on the very long journey, in which he has to take three modes of transport to Miggershausen. The town's people are not very welcoming and the radio is confronted by a barking dog, a man drops a plant pot on his head, he gets a bucket of water in the face, and finally he is thrown out by a pitchfork onto a rubbish heap. The short film describes Miggershausen as “living behind the moon”.

The radio decides he needs some assistance and sends a message over the airwaves to his fellow radios who answer his call for help. The army of radios make their journey to Miggershausen and come up with a plan to infiltrate the town. They disguise themselves as bushes and scarecrows to edge their way closer, then they finally enter the town through a tunnel they have dug and by using ladders to climb over the wall. When the convoy finally makes it into Miggershausen they raise a white flag (or more accurately a pair of white trousers) to show they now have control over the town. The head radio then assigns specific tasks to each radio under his command and they begin the reformative operation to make Miggershausen a more efficient town.

The radios give the townspeople advice on how to regenerate their land and make sure the cows are well-fed; the image of malnourished cows with their bones showing transforms into happy fatter cows who reward the people with an ongoing supply of milk. The chicken shed is refurbished, a dank dirty yard is replaced with a fully functioning drainage system producing fresh water for everyone, and fences are built in the fields so the animals can be separated with each space having its own fresh water trough. The chicken shed is also refurbished with a larger supply of chickens, which lay high-quality eggs. A man is seen listening to the radio's weather report and rushes to get a cart full of hay safely into a shed before heavy rain comes down. Upon completion, the leader of the radio army stands on top of a platform and begins a speech to which all the town's people and all the animals listen intently. A man thanks the radio for his help and pulls out a purse full of money.

What follows then is a series of clips of different people in the town relaxing in their homes, each accompanied by thought bubbles with different types of music playing. Then the town's people are gathered for a dance with the radio clapping along. The end of the animation shows the head radio painting over the town sign and replacing the name Miggershausen with Frohenhausen: froh being one of the German words for happy.

== Background ==
When broadcasting was introduced in Germany in the early 1920s, those who wished to produce radio programs had to apply for a license which was granted by the Postal Ministry. Broadcasting was to differ from the two other popular forms of media –television and the press – in that it was to be "above party politics". Those who wanted to become shareholders in radio programs could not be linked with or be part of any political parties, and neither could anyone from a foreign land own shares to stop international influences within radio programs. Each radio company operating within their own region had total control on what was broadcast in their own area which minimised any competition. There was also a system in place that restricted the profits of any shareholders by having them sign over 51 percent of the company's assets to the public authorities in exchange for a final operating license; the post office claiming the majority of these shares. This was done to prevent any private individual acquiring "unreasonable profits" and so that broadcasting companies were closely connected to the public authorities, making German broadcasting both a "capitalist business and a profit-restricted public enterprise" or what is now known as a mixed economy. As the postal ministry acquired the majority of assets from the Reichs-Rundfunk-Gesellschaft; a network of broadcasting companies in Germany. It is clear that the authorities owned and controlled most broadcasting companies in Germany from the beginning.

Like those who were producing radio programs, those who were listening also needed a "license to install and operate a wireless receiver", in addition to paying monthly fee of 2 Reichsmark. One Ministry official who had a great interest in broadcasting was Hans Bredow, a man who wanted to use broadcasting to promote "culture and education and . . . . social unity" by entertaining the nation not just with music but with "concerts, operas and lectures". These kinds of programs were mainly aimed at the lower-classes as a way to integrate them into the "German Kulturnation" and as an attempt to create a social unity across Germany. Of course, there were several problems with this, starting with the way the first radios were built as up until 1927 radios were complicated pieces of equipment that needed frequently tuning, with no loudspeaker: listeners had to use headsets, which would not have made for a very enjoyable or socially united experience. The design of the wireless changed after 1927 when the complicated wiring was hidden inside a wooden box and a loudspeaker was included making it much easier to operate and listen to.

However, these new radios were expensive, with one costing around 250 Reichsmarks so not many people could afford them. There was a cheaper radio available called the Detektor which did not have an integrated speaker and could only pick up sound when close to a radio station. As only 31 percent of the population lived in these urban areas where radio reception was possible, the majority of people would have had to purchase the more expensive design. This changed in 1930 when transmitting stations that reached a wider area were commissioned by the Reichspost meaning that over two thirds of the German population were able to listen to the radio using the more affordable sets. Yet the social divide of listeners was still evident by the fact that of the middle classes 1 out of 2 homes owned a radio compared with working-class families where only 1 out of every 7 households owned one. Money was the main reason for this, not just the monthly fees but the cost of running the wireless would have made having the radio an unnecessary cost to some families. A national survey taken 10 years after broadcasting was first introduced showed the difference in people's tastes in music and interests and Weimar's broadcasting technique of catering for the tastes of the minority; the middle-classes, failed to culturally unite the people of Germany. By 1932 radio companies in Germany officially became public enterprises when all private investors were bought out and all assets were controlled by the postal ministry and the Lander governments this bringing the mixed economy of German broadcasting to an end. When the Nazi party came to power in 1933 they decided to strip the Lander governments of their power over broadcasting and the Berlin Ministry for propaganda gained total control over German broadcasting.

== Nazi propaganda ==
When Hitler became Chancellor in January 1933, the Nazi Party embarked on a 5-week political campaign aimed at increasing the Nazi party's supporters before the March elections. This included using the radio to broadcast their propaganda daily, and also reducing the airtime of its coalition partner the German National Peoples Party. In March 1933, the Ministry of Public Enlightenment and Propaganda was formed with Joseph Goebbels as its head. Upon the creation of his ministry, he immediately took control of the National Broadcasting Company, making him and other key Nazi officials in charge of all radio broadcasts. Goebbels knew what an effective platform radio broadcasting could be in distributing Nazi propaganda and so a people's receiver; knows as the volksempfanger, was put into production as soon as the Nazi's assumed power. Goebbels pushed manufacturers to dramatically increase the production of the People's Radio even making sure small and cheaper versions of this radio were made so everyone in Germany could have one in their own home. Goebbels also pressed for volksempfangers to be in all public places making these broadcasts even more accessible. Goebbels insisted on hiring local "wireless wardens" so the public could be warned of any important future broadcasts.

By using the radio as a propaganda tool, the Nazi Party did succeed in gaining more votes which is not surprising as from 1933 onwards it would have been heavily biased towards the Nazi Party's views. Anti-Semitic propaganda began airing as soon as the Nazi's took control of broadcasting but it was not the party's main focus although Anti-Semitic broadcasts did start to increase for a while after the Nuremberg Laws were put into place in 1935 which meant Jews were no longer allowed to be German citizens and were also prohibited from marrying or having a sexual relationship with non-Jews. Anti-Semitic propaganda died down over the next two years until a German diplomat was killed by a man named Herschel Gryszpan, who happened to be Jewish. From the beginning of 1939, Anti-Semitic messages were constantly broadcast with the aim of spreading the message that there was a very real and dangerous Jewish conspiracy against the German people. Nazi propaganda was only successful if its audience already inclined to agree with the propaganda message.

This animation has a strong military style throughout. The Battle for Miggershausen begins with an army of radios marching to the town from a broadcasting centre; the speedy single line march is made to look like an envoy of military trucks and obvious military maneuvers are used to sneak into town. Once they have control over the town, they raise a makeshift white flag, showing the rest of the country this town has surrendered. The leader of the radio army is represents Hitler, symbolized with a similar speech style in his speech to the town at the end.

This propaganda took advantage of the popular and novel radio broadcasting. Short animations were very popular in Germany due to the success of the Walt Disney cartoons, Hitler and Goebbels were ardent fans of the films. As a Nazi policy, the modernizing of agricultural areas, improving the social and economic aspects of the population, appealed to the working-classes and the rural middle-classes small farm-owner who were suffering from Germany's economic crisis.

== General references ==
- Führer, Karl Christian (December 1997). "A Medium of Modernity? Broadcasting in Weimar Germany, 1923–1932". The Journal of Modern History. 69 (4): 722–753. doi:10.1086/245592.
- Adena, Maja; Enikolopov, Ruben; Petrova, Maria; Santarosa, Veronica; Zhuravskaya, Ekaterina (1 November 2015). "Radio and the Rise of The Nazis in Prewar Germany". The Quarterly Journal of Economics. 130 (4): 1885–1939. doi:10.1093/qje/qjv030.
