= Diehl Film =

German film company

Diehl Film, otherwise known as Diehl Bros. Film or the Diehl Brothers, was a filmmaking business organized by brothers Ferdinand, Hermann, and Paul Diehl.

== Technique ==
The Diehl brothers were filmmakers in Munich who were known for their stop motion fairy-tale movies and their most famous character, a hedgehog named Mecki. Mecki's popularity in Germany created licensing deals for the filmmakers and the character's success and popularity has been compared to Mickey Mouse.

The work of the brothers has included silhouette, stop motion, and puppet techniques. They made cartoons, "cultural films", and advertisement films as well as television shows.

Hermann Diehl designed and carved puppets for the enterprise. Their studio was in the Gräfelfing neighborhood.

== Filmography ==
- The Seven Ravens (1937)
- Storming of a Medieval City Circa 1350
- The Race Between the Hare and the Hedgehog (1938)
- Dornröschen (circa 1942)
- Der Flaschenteufe (1952, adaptation of The Bottle Imp
- Gutenberg (1960)
- The Gnomes (1968)
- Bremen Town Musicians (1970)
