= Monsieur Pointu =

Violinist from Quebec

Paul Cormier (10 May 1922 – 7 June 2006) was a violinist from Quebec, Canada, known by his stage name Monsieur Pointu.

== Early life ==
Cormier was born in Les Escoumins, North Shore, Quebec, into a family of traveling musicians. He began learning to play the fiddle at the age of nine. He served in the military during World War II.

== Career ==
As a young man, Cormier played violin on CBJ radio in Chicoutimi, and later in dance clubs and hotels in Montreal. He performed with musicians Willie Lamothe, Marcel Martel, Roger Miron, and Paul Brunelle, and also as an opening solo act at concerts. In the 1970s he toured in Europe and Africa with singer Gilbert Bécaud, taking on the stage name Monsieur Pointu, and also hosted a television folk music series on Télé-Métropole.

Cormier played the sound track for an animated film about his music, Monsieur Pointu, which was nominated for an Academy Award in 1976. In 1977 he performed at the Fete Nationale in Montreal's Olympic Stadium to a crowd of 40,000.

Cormier died June 6, 2006, in Blainville, Quebec. After his death, Cormier's violin was donated to the Jules Saint-Michel violin museum.
