= La Linea (TV series) =

Italian cartoon (1971–86)

- La Linea
- Genre: Animation, Comedy, Cartoon series
- Created by: Osvaldo Cavandoli (Cava)
- Voices of: Carlo Bonomi (all voices)
- Theme music composer: Franco Godi
- Country of origin: Italy
- Original language: Grammelot (gibberish)
- No. of seasons: 3
- No. of episodes: 90

Production
- Running time: 2-6 minutes
- Production companies: B. Del Vita (season 1); HDH Film/TV (season 2); Telecip-Belokapi (season 2); Wagner-Hallig Film GmbH (seasons 2–3); Quipos srl (season 3)

Original release
- Network: RAI
- Release: 1971 – 1986

Related
- Carosello

La Linea ("The Line") is an Italian animated series created by the Italian cartoonist Osvaldo Cavandoli. The series consists of 90 episodes, which were originally broadcast on the Italian channel RAI between 1971 and 1986. The background tune for the series was created by Franco Godi.

The series features a man known as "Mr. Linea" (voiced by Carlo Bonomi in a grammelot similar to the Milanese dialect of Lombard) drawn as a single outline of an infinite line, which encounters various obstacles during his walking, and often turns to the cartoonist, represented as a live-action hand holding a pencil, to draw him a solution. All episodes are short subjects, ranging from 2:30 to 6:40 in runtime.

The series aired in more than 50 countries around the world; due to the short length of episodes, it has often been used in many networks as an interstitial program, including in the United States. Over the years, La Linea gained a widespread popularity worldwide, and it is considered to be a cult classic. It also spawned a comic strip, books, additional short movies, merchandising gadgets and objects, and countless homages and parodies, with many appearances of the protagonist in other media.

Even though the episodes are numbered up to 225, there are actually 90 La Linea episodes. The 1971 series had 8 episodes, the 1978 series had 56 (101–156), and the 1986 series had 26 (200–225). All episodes of the series are also available on DVD.

== Synopsis ==
The cartoon features a man (known as "Mr. Linea") drawn as a single outline around his silhouette, walking on an infinite line of which he is a part. The character encounters obstacles and often turns to the cartoonist, represented as a live-action hand holding a white grease pencil, to draw him a solution, with various degrees of success. One recurring obstacle was an abrupt end of the line. The character would often almost fall off the edge into oblivion and get angry with the cartoonist and complain about it.

== Production history ==
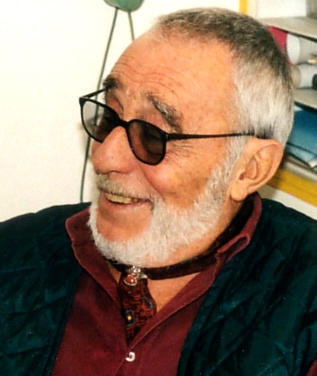
Osvaldo Cavandoli

In 1969, Osvaldo Cavandoli proposed his character "Mr. Linea" to some advertising agencies that made films for Carosello. The character pleased the engineer Emilio Lagostina, art collector and owner of the pressure cooker industry Lagostina, who wanted him to be the protagonist of some commercials for his company.

The presentation of the character, initially called Agostino Lagostina (the name was later removed after the first series) was: "Who is Agostino? A lively little man, with a truly expressive nose, with all the concerns and concerns of modern life. Son of a pencil and a hand."

The character was voiced by Carlo Bonomi in a mock version of Milanese that resembled gibberish as much as possible, with occasional Italian or English words, giving the cartoon the possibility to be easily exported without dubbing. The voice resembles Pingu, which was also voiced by Bonomi. The background tune for the series was edited by Franco Godi and Corrado Tringali.

The first 8 episodes of the series were created to publicize Lagostina kitchenware products, and the accompanying narration identified Mr. Linea. After the series broke its association with Lagostina, the character became the protagonist of his own television series, which enjoyed huge success worldwide. 90 episodes were produced.

== International broadcast ==
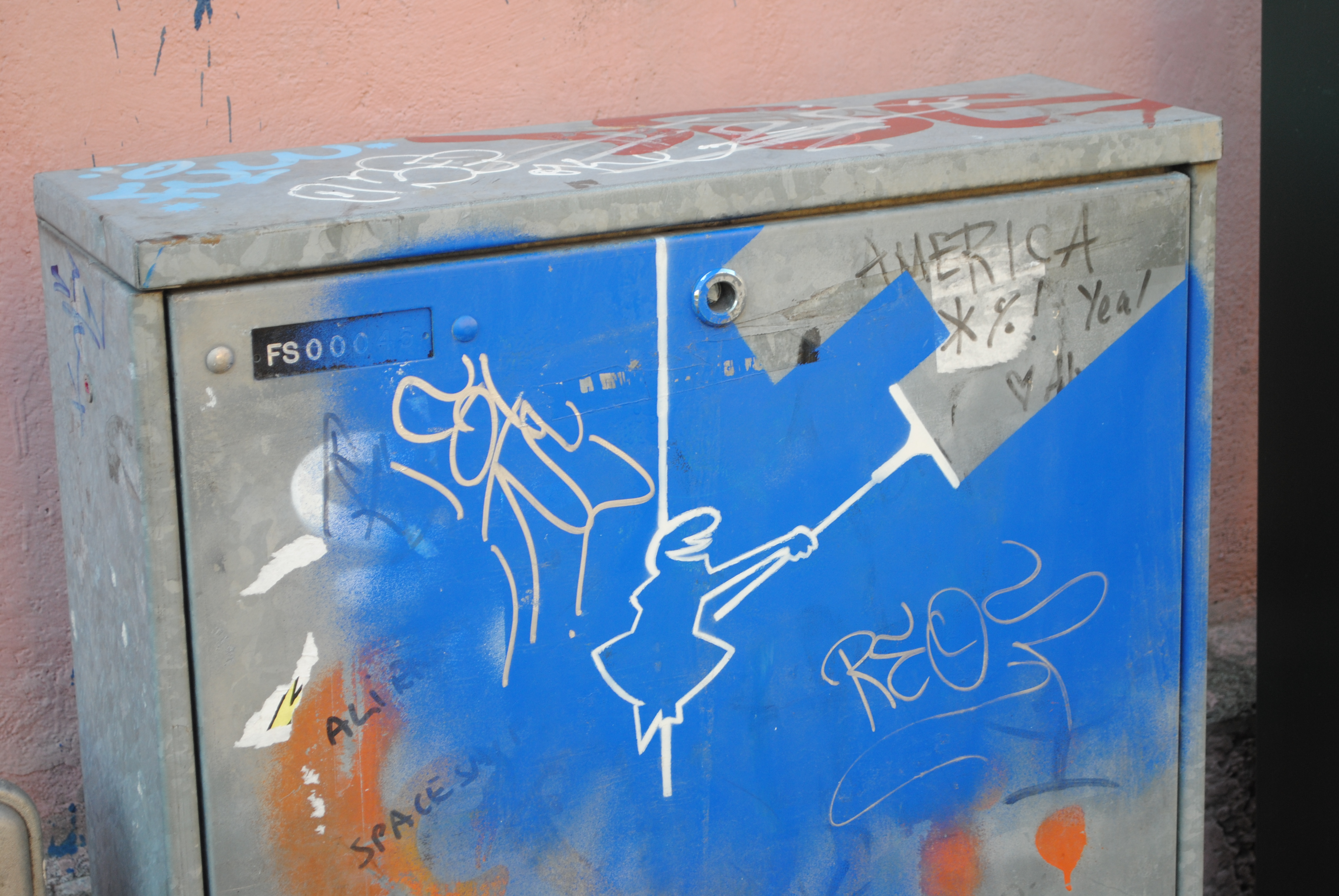
La Linea graffiti on a feeder pillar in Oslo, Norway (June 2012)

From 1972 on La Linea was shown on numerous TV stations in Europe as well as in cinema, mostly as interstitial between commercials. La Linea was shown in more than 50 countries over the world. The series won prizes 1972 in Annecy and 1973 in Zagreb.

- In the United States, the La Linea cartoons were first shown as part of KQED's International Animation Festival in the 1970s, and later featured on the children's TV series The Great Space Coaster, although La Linea was given different names by the show's characters before the cartoon was played. Not all La Linea cartoons were featured on the show, as some had a mature theme and were therefore considered inappropriate for children.
- In Iran, La Linea was aired on Islamic Republic of Iran Broadcasting (IRIB)
- La Linea was aired in Yugoslavia on TV Zagreb in the 1980s regularly.
- In United Kingdom, La Linea was aired on BBC Two occasionally from 1980 to 1981, and on Central in 1988.
- In Canada, the La Linea cartoons aired on Radio-Canada, TVJQ and TVO.
- In South Africa, it was aired on SABC-TV during the late-1970s and early-1980s as a filler. SABC-TV carried no advertising during shows at the time, and needed to fill gaps, for example before top-of-the-hour news broadcasts.
- In Australia, La Linea was aired on Australian Broadcasting Corporation as a filler between longer programmes.
- In the Netherlands, La Linea was aired on VPRO in 1978, 1985 and 1988.
- In Sweden, La Linea aired on SVT as a filler from the 1970s until the 1990s, and then again as filler on TV4 Guld and TV4 Komedi from 2006 until 2011.
- In Norway, La Linea aired on NRK as a filler from the mid-1970s until the late-1980s. From 30 June until 31 October 2008, Norwegian newspaper Dagbladet published all episodes of La Linea as daily episodes on its website (La Linea 1–8, 101–156, 200–225).
- In Hungary, La Linea was first aired on MTV1 on Szombat Esti Filmkoktél (Saturday Night Film Cocktail) from 1981 until the 1990s, and later on MTV2 as an interstitial program.

=== DVD releases ===
A set of three DVDs containing all the episodes was released in Germany in 2003 and re-edited in September 2008. The first volume was released in France, Hungary, Serbia and Scandinavia. A set of two DVDs containing 56 episodes is sold in Quebec since 2008 by Imavision. The complete series was released in Scandinavia in the beginning of 2008 in a 3-disc box set.

== Other media ==
Cavandoli also adapted his animated cartoon series into a comic strip, which won many international awards.

== Popular culture ==
- The music videos for Italian DJ Gigi D'Agostino's 1999 hit song "Bla Bla Bla" as well as his cover of Nik Kershaw's song "The Riddle" are animated in the style of La Linea.
- The opening sequence of the UK TV comedy series Whose Line Is It Anyway? used La Linea style for seasons 6 to 9, with a "Hollywood" variation of the sequence for season 10.
- In 2005, the video for the Jamiroquai song "(Don't) Give Hate a Chance" paid homage to La Linea. The video is an animated commentary on the war on terrorism and features 3D representations of the familiar La Linea character, as well as the animator's hand and pencil.
- BabyFirst TV uses a La Linea style animation for the opening and closing animation for their BabyFirst TV FYI segments
- In October 2012 Ford ran a TV ad campaign for its C-MAX hybrid using La Linea.
- In late 1990s, Polish telecom Polkomtel used La Linea in a TV ad campaign for its prepaid brand SimPlus.
- Shortly before his death, Cavandoli made some commercials for the Icelandic banking company Kaupthing featuring La Linea.
- A campaign for Viasat broadcast in Norway in 2009 targeted audiences which would, from December year, pay extra for TV2, and used the La Linea style. Two commercials were made, targeting RiksTV's pricing, with Viasat claiming that its basic package was cheaper than RiksTV's. RiksTV was soliciting the withdrawal of Viasat's campaign in October.
- The 2020 Pixar movie Soul has the soul counselors ("Jerrys"), which were seen by critics as a reference to La Linea.

== Alternative names ==
The show is known by different names around the world, including:

- Albania and Kosovo: "Barum Badum"
- Argentina: "Abelardo"
- Brazil: "A Linha"
- Canada (Québec): "La ligne"
- China: "Xiàntiáo xiānshēng" / "線條先生" (Mr. Line)
- Croatia: "Bajum Badum"
- Denmark: "Stregen" (The Line)
- Finland: "Linus linjalla" (Linus on the line)
- France: "La Linéa"
- Greece: "Μπαρούμ Μπαρούμ" / "Barúm Barúm"
- Hungary: "Menő Manó" (Walking Dwarf or Cool Dwarf)
- Iceland: "Línan" (The Line)
- Iran: "Aghaaye Khat" / "آقای خط" (Mr. Line)
- Israel: "Mar Kav" / "מר קו" (Mr. Line)
- Norway: "Streken" (The Line)
- Poland: "Balum balum" and sometimes "Złośniczek" (Little Rascal)
- Saudi Arabia: "AlSeyed Khat" / "السيد خط" (Mr. Line)
- Slovenia: "Linea" or "Badum Badum"
- Sweden: "Linus på linjen" (Linus on the line, originally just "Linjen")
- Turkey: "Bay Meraklı" (Mr. Curious) and "Çizgi Adam" (Line Man)
- Macedonia: "Бајум Бајум"
- Serbia: "Линија" / "Linija" (The Line) or "Барум Барум" / "Barum Barum" or "Абаракандиши Ди Фјури" / "Abarakandiši Di Fjuri"
- United States: "Lineman"
