= David Sant =

Spanish actor and director

- Born: 1968 (age 57–58); Catalonia, Spain
- Occupations: writer artist; stuntman; director; actor
- Years active: 1991–present

David Sant is a Spanish mime artist, acrobat, puppeteer, stuntman, director, actor and writer.

== Early life ==
David Sant was born in Spain.

== Career ==
Sant moved to the UK in the early nineties, where he began performing as a mime artist, acrobat, puppeteer, stuntman and directed for many physical theatre companies winning several awards at different international festivals. In 2006, he was approached by the BBC to bring his comedy skills to television and has been directing sitcoms and comedy dramas ever since.

Sant is known for the role of Cartoon Head from series two of the British television show Ideal and is also known for playing the title role and the other male characters in the series 5–6 revival of Pingu, replacing Carlo Bonomi.

He has directed many television series, including Jonathan Creek, Benidorm, Stella, and Significant Other.

He has also appeared in theatrical roles, including Mindbender, presented by the theatre company Peepolykus, and All in the Timing by David Ives, also presented by Peepolykus.

== Filmography ==
=== Director/writer ===
- Fast Forward (1991)
- My Spy Family (2007–2010)
- Not Waving (2005)
- The Golf War (2007)
- Living with Two People You Like Individually... But Not as a Couple (2007)
- Comedy Cuts (2007)
- Coming of Age (2007–2008)
- The Gym (2008)
- Scallywagga (2010)
- Yonderland (2013–2016)
- The Reluctant Landlord (2018–2019)
- Significant Other (2023)

=== Acting credits ===
- My Family (2003) – Restaurant Waiter
- Pingu (2003–06) – Pingu, various characters (voice)
- Doctor Who (2005) – Auton
- Ideal (2005–11) – Cartoon Head, Enrique
- Columbus: The Lost Voyage (2007) – Bartolome Columbus
- Time Trumpet (2006) – Fictionalised version of himself
- Comic Relief 2007: The Big One (2007) – Himself
- Paddington 2 (2017) – Steward on train
