= The Seven Ravens (1937 film) =

- 2004 DVD cover
- Directed by: Ferdinand Diehl; Hermann Diehl
- Screenplay by: Paul Diehl
- Based on: The Seven Ravens by Jacob Grimm and Wilhelm Grimm
- Produced by: Puppentrickfilm
- Cinematography: Alfonse Lufteck
- Music by: Walter Pepper
- Release date: 2 December 1937
- Running time: 53 minutes
- Country: Germany
- Language: German

The Seven Ravens (German: Die sieben Raben) is a German stop motion-animated fairy tale film directed by the Diehl brothers (Diehl Film). It was released in Germany on 2 December 1937. The film is notable for being an animated feature film based on a Grimm brothers' fairy tale of the same name, premiering only a few weeks before Walt Disney's Snow White and the Seven Dwarfs. In that respect it is often cited as one of the first animated feature films.

== Plot ==
A jester greets the audience and requests that they relax and enjoy the story of The Seven Ravens.

During springtime, a peasant girl is fetching water from the village well when she overhears some neighbours gossiping about her, blaming her for the loss of her brothers. Having grown up believing she is her parents' only child, the girl runs home and asks her mother if she does have any siblings; the girl's mother reluctantly confesses to having had seven other children before her, all of them boys.

Years before the girl was born, her parents loved their seven sons, but wished to have a daughter. When the couple's eighth child turned out to be a girl, they were overjoyed, but she was born sickly. Fearing she would die unbaptised, her father sent her seven older brothers to the well to fetch a pitcher of water for her baptism. All seven brothers rushed to the well, but in their haste, the pitcher fell into it; afraid of their father punishing them, the seven boys did not go home. Thinking that his sons had gone out to play and forgotten all about their task, the father angrily wished they turn into seven ravens, only to regret his words when the curse came true and saw the seven brothers flying away. Even though their remaining child became healthy without the baptismal water, the couple had kept her brothers' existence a secret out of fear of losing her too.

When the girl's father comes home from work that night, he is upset she now knows the truth, but his wife tells him there is nothing to be done. The next morning, the girl secretly leaves home, vowing to search for the seven ravens. The girl asks villager after villager where her brothers are, but none of them know. When the girl arrives in the middle of the forest, a good fairy appears, telling her that the seven ravens live safely in the Glass Mountain. The fairy also informs the seven ravens' sister on how to lift the curse: for seven years, she must not speak while sewing seven shirts made out of her long golden hair. The girl agrees to perform the difficult task and begins sewing the shirts silently, sheltering in a hollow tree.

For six years, the seven ravens' sister grows into a beautiful maiden as she quietly sews their shirts and only has the wild animals for company. Early into the seventh year, a prince spots the maiden while out hunting with his friends. Stunned by the silent maiden's beauty, the prince takes her home and makes her his wife in spite of some subjects' objections to the match. Despite living a luxurious lifestyle, the peasant maiden-turned-princess remains mute to finish the seventh and last shirt; during winter, she opens the castle doors to the poor and gives them food.

On the first day of spring, the princess gives birth to twin sons. But the midwives have only started bathing the princelings when the babies suddenly turn into ravens and fly out the window. Because the seventh year is not over yet, the fairy briefly appears to order the princess to remain silent. However, the prince's sister has witnessed her nephews transforming into birds and accuses her sister-in-law of being a witch. Unable to defend herself at the trial, the princess gets convicted of practicing witchcraft and sentenced to be burned at the stake.

On the day of the princess's execution, she has successfully sewn her seven brothers' shirts. When the princess is led away to be burned, the fairy brings the shirts to the Glass Mountain, dropping them onto the seven ravens and they transform into seven adult men. With the curse lifted, the fairy informs the seven men of their sister's execution and commands them to save her; upon climbing down the Glass Mountain, the eldest brother borrows a horse and orders the others to follow him to the capital square where the execution will take place.

At the capital square, the poor believe the princess to be innocent and have gathered to oppose her execution. The prince, too, believes his wife to be innocent and abdicates in protest. Just as the princess is about to be burned, her brothers show up, telling her that she can now speak as she has freed them. The fairy also appears to give the princess her children back.

With the truth revealed, the prince embraces his wife and children and they all live happily ever after.

== See also ==
- List of stop-motion films
- List of animated feature-length films
