= Bernard Longpré =

Canadian film director

Bernard Longpré (January 1, 1937 – June 24, 2002) was a Canadian director and animator.

Longpré was born in 1937 in Montreal, Quebec.

== Filmography ==
- An Introduction to Jet Engines (1959)
- Bandwidth (1960)
- Four-line Conics (1961)
- Fundamentals of Fish Spoilage (1962)
- An Introduction to NUTMEG (1963)
- IFF Mark 10: Selective Identification Feature (1963)
- The Ball Resolver in Antac (1964)
- Country Auction (1964)
- Test 0558 (1965)
- Glaciation (1965)
- Dimensions (1966)
- En février (1966)
- L'Évasion des carrousels (1968)
- Tête en fleurs (1969)
- Dimension soleils (1970)
- Nébule (1973)
- Branch et Branch (1974)
- Contes de la mère loi sur cinéma (1975)
- Monsieur Pointu (1975)
- L'Invasion (1775-1975) (1976)
- Les Naufragés du quartier/One Way Street (1980)
- La Solution (1985)
- Itinerary/Itinéraire (1987)
- Felicity/Félicité (1989)
