= Ron Dias =

American animator and painter

Ronald Lionel Dias (February 15, 1937 – July 30, 2013) was an American animator and painter who began his career in 1956 after winning a stamp animation contest organized jointly by the U.S. Post Office, the U.S. Office of Education and Counsel of Chief State Schools' officers. He contributed to films such as The Secret of NIMH, The Chipmunk Adventure and Who Framed Roger Rabbit. He died on July 30, 2013.
