= Antanas Janauskas =

Lithuanian animation film director, designer and writer (1937–2016)

Antanas Janauskas (June 20, 1937 – February 23, 2016) was a Lithuanian animation film director, designer and writer.

In 1970, he created the first Lithuanian film studio animated movie The Initiative, whose theme was inspired by Prague Spring events. He has directed numerous animated films and documentaries.

== Filmography ==
- Atspaudas (1986)
- Užkrečiantis pavyzdys (1987)
- Palankios aplinkybės (1989)
- Kėdė (1995)
- Ovacijos (1998)
- Telegastrovizija (2000)
- Trumpas sujungimas (2003)
- Užsisek saugos diržą! (1996)
- Perėja (1998)
