= Osvaldo Cavandoli =

Italian cartoonist (1920–2007)

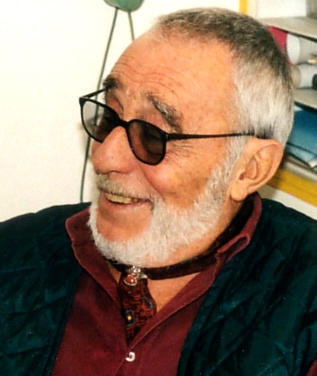
Osvaldo Cavandoli

Osvaldo Cavandoli (1 January 1920 – 3 March 2007), also known by his pen name Cava, was an Italian cartoonist. His most famous work is his series of short animated cartoons, La Linea ("The Line").

== Early life, family and education ==
Cavandoli was born in Maderno sul Garda, Italy, on the shores of Lake Garda. He and his family moved to Milan when he was two years old. (He was later made an honorary citizen of the city.)

== Career ==
From 1936 to 1940, he worked as a technical designer for Alfa Romeo. When he developed his interest in cartoons in 1943, he started working with Nino Pagot, who later created Calimero. In 1950, he started working independently as a director and a producer.

=== La Linea ===
Cavandoli enjoyed worldwide recognition in 1969 with his character La Linea, a simply drawn cartoon born and lived out of a single white pencil stroke. Cavandoli initially proposed his work for Carosello, an Italian advertisement break broadcast between 1957 and 1977. Massimo Lagostina, the owner of a popular eponymous brand of cookware, chose it as a testimonial for his advertising campaign. Following the success of the commercial, La Linea became the protagonist of an animated series subsequently adopted in many European countries. La Linea is the subject of a semiotic analysis defining the audiovisual as a contemporary universal language. The book Il Segno audiovisivo. Cinema d'animazione e nuovi linguaggi (English: The audiovisual sign. Animated film and new languages), written by Eleonora Oreggia and published by Meltemi Editore in 2022, included an interview with CAVA recorded in the artist's studio in Milan on Christmas 2001.

== Personal life and death ==
Cavandoli died in Milan, Italy, at age 87.
