= Carosello =

Italian TV series

- Country of origin: Italy
- Original language: Italian
- No. of episodes: 7261

Production
- Running time: 10 minutes
- Production company: RAI

Original release
- Network: Rai 1, Rai 2
- Release: 3 February 1957 – 1 January 1977

Carosello (Italian for 'carousel') is an Italian television advertising show that was broadcast on RAI from 1957 to 1977. The series mainly showed short sketch comedy films using live action, various types of animation, and puppetry. It had an audience of about 20 million viewers.

== History ==
Initially, the only income for Italian television broadcasters came from subscription fees, but the amount was still very low. Rai had already thought of introducing a space dedicated to advertising in the television schedule. RAI was looking for an original, innovative and interesting way to offer it to the public in a pleasant way through entertainment and shows without disturbing them. Then came the idea of making relatively long (average three minutes) funny curtains, comics and sketches, which attracted people's attention.

At an experimental level, some of the test procedures were performed with the proto-caroselli, based on fictitious products, made in Turin, Rome and Milan. In fact, this is what the carousel will look like two years later.

=== Animated segments ===
Carosello began to feature hand drawn and stop-motion segments in its second year, produced by Gamma Film, Paul Film, and Studio Pagot among others. Among the series' most notable segments were Calimero and La Linea, who appeared in other content outside Carosello.

Pallina.

Pallina (Italian for 'little ball') was an Italian cartoon character created by Quartetto Cetra for the series. She originally appeared in the 1960s, running from 1961 to 1969, and was a mascot for various cleaning products, including Solex and Vetril.

== See also ==
- Admag
