= Otmar Gutmann =

German producer and filmmaker (1937–1993)

- Born: 24 April 1937; Münstertal, Nazi Germany
- Died: 13 October 1993 (aged 56); Russikon, Switzerland
- Burial place: Russikon Cemetery
- Occupations: Filmmaker, Animator
- Years active: 1960–1993
- Known for: Pingu

Otmar Gutmann (24 April 1937 – 13 October 1993) was a German filmmaker who specialised in animation. He co-created the stop-motion television series Pingu alongside Erika Brueggemann.

== Career ==
He started as an amateur in the 1960s. As a professional he only made one personal work, Aventures (1978). It was based on a piece of music by György Ligeti. He brought the sculptural universe of Lubomir Stepan to life as an exploration of human condition. In 1980, he was one of the leading animators of the plasticine characters Frédéric and Frédéri from Lucy the Menace of Street. Later, in 1986, he designed the character of Pingu. A TV series starring the character, which Gutmann co-created with Erika Brueggemann, became successful internationally.

== Death ==
On 13 October 1993, Gutmann died of a heart attack at the age of 56. He was buried at the Russikon Cemetery. His company, The Pygos Group, decided to keep producing Pingu episodes with a new team. On 29 October 2001, the company collapsed and its assets were sold to HIT Entertainment.
