= Hamlet (1961 film) =

1961 film by Franz Peter Wirth

- Promotional poster
- Hamlet, Prinz von Dänemark
- Based on: Hamlet; 1599 play by William Shakespeare
- Screenplay by: Franz Peter Wirth
- Directed by: Franz Peter Wirth
- Starring: Maximilian Schell
- Music by: Rolf Unkel
- Country of origin: West Germany
- Original language: German

Production
- Producer: Hans Gottschalk
- Cinematography: Kurt Gewissen; Boris Goriup; Hermann Gruber; Rudolf H. Jakob
- Editor: Adolf Schlyssleder
- Running time: 152 minutes

Original release
- Release: 1 January 1961

Hamlet (German: Hamlet, Prinz von Dänemark, lit. 'Hamlet, Prince of Denmark') is a 1961 German mystery drama film directed by Franz Peter Wirth. The screenplay by Wirth is adapted from the William Shakespeare tragedy of the same name.

== Release ==
The film was initially broadcast on television on 1 January 1961 in West Germany before being released theatrically in the United States in 1962. The version featured on a 1999 episode of Mystery Science Theater 3000 is widely available but the original film is extremely difficult to find.

== Plot ==
Prince Hamlet of Denmark returns home to find his father murdered and his mother remarrying the murderer, his uncle.

== Cast ==
- Maximilian Schell as Hamlet
- Hans Caninenberg as Claudius
- Wanda Rotha as Gertrude
- Dunja Movar as Ophelia
- Franz Schafheitlin as Polonius
- Dieter Kirchlechner as Laertes
- Karl Michael Vogler as Horatio
- Eckart Dux as Rosencrantz
- Herbert Bötticher as Guildenstern
- Karl Lieffen as Osric
- Rolf Boysen as Bernardo
- Michael Paryla as Francisco
- Alexander Engel as Ghost
- Adolf Gerstung as Actor
- Paul Verhoeven as First gravedigger
- Johannes Buzalski as Second gravedigger

== Reception ==
Bill Gibron, writing for DVD Verdict, said that "In the literary life, you either love Shakespeare or you don't, and the Germans definitely do not. This 1960 television version of the Bard's brainchild is so cold and calculated it's like Berlin in February." FlickFilosopher wrote that "this is a take on Hamlet that could otherwise be construed as cruel and unusual punishment." Kevin Murphy of Mystery Science Theater 3000 wrote, "Leave it to Germany to turn a bleak brooding play into an even bleaker, broodinger movie-of-the-week for German television. This thing, made in the early '60s, has 'we're still really sorry for the war and feel terrible' all over it."

== Dub ==
Hamlet was dubbed into English under the supervision of Edward Dmytryk. Schell provided his own voice: among the other actors used for the dub were Ricardo Montalbán (Claudius) and John Banner (Polonius). This dub was later featured in a season 10 episode of Mystery Science Theater 3000, its length cut to fit the show's 92-minute runtime.
