= Hamlet (2000 film) =

2000 film by Michael Almereyda

- Theatrical release poster
- Directed by: Michael Almereyda
- Screenplay by: Michael Almereyda
- Based on: Hamlet by William Shakespeare
- Produced by: Andrew Fierberg; Amy Hobby
- Starring: Ethan Hawke; Kyle MacLachlan; Diane Venora; Liev Schreiber; Julia Stiles; Bill Murray; Karl Geary; Steve Zahn; Sam Shepard
- Cinematography: John de Borman
- Edited by: Kristina Boden
- Music by: Carter Burwell
- Production company: double A Films
- Distributed by: Miramax Films
- Release dates: January 24, 2000 (Sundance); May 12, 2000 (United States)
- Running time: 112 minutes
- Country: United States
- Language: English
- Box office: $2 million

Hamlet, also known as Hamlet 2000, is a 2000 American drama film written and directed by Michael Almereyda, set in contemporary New York City, and based on the Shakespeare play of the same name. Ethan Hawke plays Hamlet as a film student, Kyle MacLachlan co-stars as Uncle Claudius, with Diane Venora as Gertrude, Liev Schreiber as Laertes, Julia Stiles as Ophelia, Steve Zahn as Rosencrantz, Bill Murray as Polonius, and Sam Shepard as Hamlet's father.

In this version of Hamlet, Claudius is the CEO or "king" of the Denmark Corporation, having taken over the firm by killing his brother, Hamlet's father.

This adaptation keeps the Shakespearean dialogue but presents a modern setting, with technology such as video cameras, Polaroid cameras, and surveillance bugs. For example, the ghost of Hamlet's murdered father first appears on closed-circuit TV.

== Adaptations ==
- Elsinore Castle, the seat of power of Denmark's crown in the play, is reimagined as Hotel Elsinore, the headquarters of Denmark Corporation.
- Prior to delivering the "To be, or not to be" monologue, Hamlet is seen watching a video of famed Buddhist teacher Thích Nhất Hạnh explaining the principle "To be is to be with others; to be is to inter-be" a basic teaching of Hanh's "Order of Interbeing".
- The "Mousetrap" play takes the form of a video art montage, edited by Hamlet himself.
- Instead of a Tapestry, Polonius hides in Gertrude's closet, then Hamlet shoots him through the door.
- The character of Marcellus, one of the soldiers, is reimagined as Marcella, Horatio's girlfriend.
- The Captain in Fortinbras' army is replaced by a flight attendant on Hamlet's flight to England.
- Instead of carrying around actual flowers, Ophelia carries polaroid photographs of various flowers. In the film, Ophelia is an amateur photographer.
- Fortinbras' conquests are not military but corporate takeovers with the aid of his "armies" of lawyers.
- As opposed to drowning in a brook, Ophelia is found to have drowned in a fountain in front of the Hotel Elsinore, surrounded by mementos of her relationship with Hamlet.
- The Ghost of King Hamlet appears in Horatio's apartment, sitting in his bedroom as Marcella sleeps before Hamlet and Horatio enter it.
- The first intervention of Osric is reimagined as a fax machine in Hamlet and Horatio's apartment, delivering Laertes' message right before the duel. However, Osric does appear during the duel between Hamlet and Laertes.
- Though Hamlet and Laertes still fence, Laertes does not kill Hamlet with a poisoned rapier (or here, foil). Instead, he shoots Hamlet with a pistol, then is shot himself. Hamlet then uses the same pistol to shoot and kill Claudius.

== Cast ==
- Ethan Hawke as Hamlet
- Kyle MacLachlan as Claudius
- Diane Venora as Gertrude
- Sam Shepard as Ghost
- Liev Schreiber as Laertes
- Julia Stiles as Ophelia
- Bill Murray as Polonius
- Karl Geary as Horatio
- Paula Malcomson as Marcella
- Steve Zahn as Rosencrantz
- Dechen Thurman as Guildenstern
- Rome Neal as Barnardo
- Jeffrey Wright as Gravedigger
- Paul Bartel as Osric
- Casey Affleck as Fortinbras
- Robert Thurman as Priest
- Tim Blake Nelson as Flight captain
- Larry Fessenden as Kissing Man

== Reception ==
On the review aggregator website Rotten Tomatoes, 59% of 97 critics' reviews are positive, with an average rating of 5.8/10. The website's consensus reads: "Stiff performances fail to produce any tension onscreen." Metacritic assigned the film a weighted average score of 70/100, based on 32 reviews from mainstream critics.

Film critic Elvis Mitchell of The New York Times lauded it as a "vital and sharply intelligent film," while The Washington Post reviewer deemed it as a "darkly interesting distraction but not much more." The reaction to Hawke's performance as the title role is also mixed. The Los Angeles Times described him as a "superb Prince of Denmark - youthful, sensitive, passionate but with a mature grasp of the workings of human nature." New York magazine, however, thought Hawke's performance was only "middling."

== See also ==
- Romeo + Juliet – another contemporary-set Shakespearean film adaptation, which also features Diane Venora.
- 10 Things I Hate About You and O – contemporary adaptations of The Taming of the Shrew and Othello, respectively, both also featuring Julia Stiles.
- Scotland, PA – a contemporary adaptation of Macbeth
