= Hamlet (2009 film) =

2009 film by Gregory Doran

- DVD cover
- Genre: Tragedy
- Written by: William Shakespeare
- Directed by: Gregory Doran
- Starring: David Tennant; Patrick Stewart
- Country of origin: United Kingdom
- Original language: English

Production
- Producers: John Wyver; Sebastian Grant
- Running time: 180 minutes
- Production companies: Illuminations; Royal Shakespeare Company

Original release
- Network: BBC Two
- Release: 26 December 2009

Hamlet is a 2009 television film adaptation of the Royal Shakespeare Company's 2008 modern-dress stage production of William Shakespeare's play of the same name, aired on BBC Two on 26 December 2009. It was broadcast by PBS' Great Performances in the United States on 28 April 2010.

Directed by Gregory Doran, it features the original stage cast of David Tennant in the title role of Prince Hamlet, Patrick Stewart as both King Claudius and the ghost of Hamlet's father, Penny Downie as Queen Gertrude, Mariah Gale as Ophelia, Edward Bennett as Laertes, Oliver Ford Davies as Polonius, and Peter de Jersey as Horatio.

== Production ==
The production was filmed with a single-camera setup, using the pioneering RED One camera technology.

== Cast ==
- Prince Hamlet — David Tennant
- King Claudius / King Hamlet — Patrick Stewart
- Queen Gertrude — Penny Downie
- Ophelia — Mariah Gale
- Horatio — Peter de Jersey
- Laertes — Edward Bennett
- Polonius — Oliver Ford Davies
- Rosencrantz / Second Gravedigger — Sam Alexander
- Guildenstern — Tom Davey
- Gravedigger — Mark Hadfield
- Player King — John Woodvine
- Osric / Player Queen — Ryan Gage
- Dumbshow King — Samuel Dutton
- Dumbshow Queen / Priest — Jim Hooper
- Reynaldo / Dumbshow Poisoner — David Ajala
- Marcellus — Keith Osborn
- Barnardo — Ewen Cummins
- Francisco / Fortinbras — Robert Curtis
- Voltemand — Roderick Smith
- Cornelia — Andrea Harris
- Lucianus — Ricky Champ
- Lady-in-waiting — Riann Steele
- Lady-in-waiting — Zoe Thorne

== DVD release ==
The film was released by 2 Entertain in the United Kingdom and Ireland on DVD on 4 January 2010 and on Blu-ray on 19 April 2010 and on DVD and Blu-ray on 4 May 2010 in the United States and Canada.

== Bibliography ==
- Wilson, Benji (20 December 2009). "David Tennant brings Hamlet to TV for Christmas". The Times.
