= Rosencrantz & Guildenstern Are Dead (film) =

1990 film by Tom Stoppard

- Theatrical release poster
- Directed by: Tom Stoppard
- Screenplay by: Tom Stoppard
- Based on: Rosencrantz and Guildenstern Are Dead by Tom Stoppard; Hamlet by William Shakespeare
- Produced by: Emanuel Azenberg; Michael Brandman
- Starring: Gary Oldman; Tim Roth; Richard Dreyfuss; Iain Glen; Ian Richardson; Donald Sumpter; Joanna Miles; Joanna Roth
- Cinematography: Peter Biziou
- Edited by: Nicolas Gaster
- Music by: Stanley Myers
- Production companies: Brandenberg; WNET Channel 13 New York
- Distributed by: Cinecom Pictures (US); Hobo Film Enterprises (UK)
- Release dates: 5 September 1990 (Venice); 12 September 1990 (Toronto); 8 February 1991 (United States); 24 May 1991 (United Kingdom)
- Running time: 117 minutes
- Countries: United Kingdom; United States
- Language: English
- Budget: £2.43 million
- Box office: $739,104 (North America) £65,957 (UK)

Rosencrantz & Guildenstern Are Dead is a 1990 period black comedy film written and directed by Tom Stoppard based on his 1966 play. Like the play, the film depicts two minor characters from William Shakespeare's play Hamlet, Rosencrantz and Guildenstern, who find themselves on the road to Elsinore Castle at the behest of the King of Denmark.

They encounter a band of players before arriving to find that they are needed to try to discern what troubles the prince Hamlet. Meanwhile, they ponder the meaning of their existence.

Filmed around Zagreb, Croatia, and in Brežice Castle, Slovenia, the movie won the Golden Lion at the 47th Venice International Film Festival.

The film stars Gary Oldman as Rosencrantz and Tim Roth as Guildenstern, although a running theme throughout has many characters, themselves included, uncertain as to which is which. It also features Richard Dreyfuss as the leading player, Iain Glen as Hamlet, Ian Richardson as Polonius, Joanna Miles as Gertrude, and Donald Sumpter as King Claudius. This was Stoppard's only film as a director.

== Plot ==
The film, like the play, focuses on Rosencrantz and Guildenstern and their actions (or lack thereof) within the play of Hamlet. The film begins as they travel on horseback to Elsinore, contemplating fate, memory and language. Rosencrantz finds and continually flips a coin which always comes up heads (until he loses the coin, which is replaced by their own coins), causing Guildenstern to conclude that something is wrong with reality.

They meet a traveling troupe of tragedians on the way, and during their conversation with the lead Player they are mysteriously transported into the action of Hamlet at Elsinore. They are asked by the Danish royal couple to stay awhile in order to help find out the cause of, and hopefully the cure for, Prince Hamlet's gloomy state. They spend their time outside the scenes in Hamlet trying to figure out what is wrong with the prince and what is required of them, wandering around the castle, trying to catch up to the action and understand what is going on by listening to/eavesdropping on other parts of the play.

The remainder of the film follows the Shakespearean drama whenever the two characters are "on stage", while the title heroes remain largely occupied with the futile hazards of daily life whenever the "main action" is elsewhere. They also view and even interact with some of the action of Hamlet where they are not on stage, such as the death of Polonius, from "behind the scenes".

Soon the very same theatre troupe arrives to perform at court, as part of the Bard's tragedy. The Player simultaneously castigates Rosencrantz and Guildenstern for abandoning their real play on the road, which cannot exist without an audience, and explains some of the plot and logic of conventional rules of plot-staging and -writing as the "play within a play" is being rehearsed.

Ultimately, they are sent to England and outside the action of the play again. The final part takes place on the ship to England, where they read the letter they are to deliver with Hamlet – discovering that it is an order for his death. They decide to pretend they never saw it. Hamlet overhears them, steals the letter after they have gone to sleep, writes one of his own, replaces it, and then (as described in Shakespeare's play) escapes on an attacking pirate ship.

Rosencrantz and Guildenstern worry about what they are to do now that Hamlet is gone, unaware that Hamlet has replaced the letter. The Player finishes the action by reading the letter that now sentences them to death. Guildenstern, still trying to struggle against destiny, stabs The Player with the other man's dagger, only to find that the weapon is a theatrical prop.

Scenes of the deaths of Ophelia, Laertes, Gertrude, Claudius and Hamlet are shown, and both Rosencrantz and Guildenstern, finally accepting their fate, are hanged. The film ends with the English Ambassador announcing that "Rosencrantz and Guildenstern are dead" and the tragedians packing up their cart and continuing on their way.

== Cast ==
- Gary Oldman as Rosencrantz
- Tim Roth as Guildenstern
- Richard Dreyfuss as The Player
- Iain Glen as Hamlet
- Ian Richardson as Polonius
- Donald Sumpter as Claudius
- Joanna Miles as Gertrude
- Joanna Roth as Ophelia
- John Burgess as Ambassador from England
- Sven Medvesck as Laertes

Daniel Day-Lewis was to be cast as Guildenstern, but he declined the role due to stress. He was replaced by Roth, who had also been in contention for the role.

== Reception and legacy ==
Critical reaction for the film tended towards the positive, with an overall rating of 61% on the review aggregator website Rotten Tomatoes, based on 31 reviews. The website's consensus reads, "Rosencrantz and Guildenstern Are Dead struggles in its journey from stage to screen, but a well-chosen trio of veteran talents keep things consistently watchable." Metacritic, which uses a weighted average, assigned the film a score of 45 out of 100, based on 8 critics, indicating "mixed or average" reviews. A common criticism in negative reviews was that the material is more suited to the stage than to the screen; examples include Vincent Canby's review, in which he says, "[Stoppard] delights in sounds and meanings, in puns, in flights of words that soar and swoop as if in visual display. On the stage, this sort of thing can be great fun ... In the more realistic medium of film, so many words can numb the eardrums and weigh upon the eyelids like old coins. This is the effect of 'Rosencrantz and Guildenstern Are Dead'." Similarly, Roger Ebert states that "the problem is that this material was never meant to be a film, and can hardly work as a film."

=== Accolades ===
The film won the Golden Lion at the Venice Film Festival as well as the Fantasporto Directors' Week Award. For his work in the film, Oldman was nominated for the 1991 Independent Spirit Award for Best Male Lead.

=== Home media ===
The film was released on DVD in the UK in 2003, and in the US in 2005, featuring interviews with Oldman, Roth, Dreyfuss, and Stoppard.

== See also ==
- Rosencrantz and Guildenstern Are Undead
