= Hamlet (1996 film) =

Film by Kenneth Branagh

- Theatrical release poster
- Directed by: Kenneth Branagh
- Screenplay by: Kenneth Branagh
- Based on: Hamlet by William Shakespeare
- Produced by: David Barron
- Starring: Kenneth Branagh; Julie Christie; Billy Crystal; Gérard Depardieu; Charlton Heston; Derek Jacobi; Jack Lemmon; Rufus Sewell; Robin Williams; Kate Winslet
- Cinematography: Alex Thomson
- Edited by: Neil Farrell
- Music by: Patrick Doyle
- Production company: Castle Rock Entertainment
- Distributed by: Rank-Castle Rock/Turner (United Kingdom); Columbia Pictures (through Sony Pictures Releasing; United States)
- Release date: 25 December 1996
- Running time: 242 minutes
- Countries: United Kingdom; United States
- Language: Early Modern English
- Budget: $18 million
- Box office: $4.7 million

Hamlet is a 1996 epic historical drama film written and directed by Kenneth Branagh, adapting William Shakespeare's play The Tragedy of Hamlet, Prince of Denmark. It stars Branagh in the title role, along with Derek Jacobi as King Claudius, Julie Christie as Queen Gertrude, Kate Winslet as Ophelia, Michael Maloney as Laertes, Richard Briers as Polonius, and Nicholas Farrell as Horatio. Other cast members include Robin Williams, Gérard Depardieu, Jack Lemmon, Billy Crystal, Rufus Sewell, Charlton Heston, Richard Attenborough, Judi Dench, John Gielgud and Ken Dodd.

The film is the first unabridged theatrical film version of Hamlet, running more than four hours. The setting is updated to the 19th century, but its Elizabethan English text remains the same. Blenheim Palace is the setting used for the exterior grounds of Elsinore Castle, and interiors were photographed at Shepperton Studios. Hamlet was the last major dramatic motion picture to be filmed entirely on 70mm film until 2011, with the release of the documentary Samsara, and Branagh's own Murder on the Orient Express.

Branagh's Hamlet has been regarded as one of the best Shakespeare film adaptations ever made. However, it was a box-office bomb, mostly due to its limited release, grossing just under US$5 million on a budget of $18 million. The film received four Oscar nominations for the 69th Academy Awards for Best Art Direction (Tim Harvey), Best Costume Design (Alexandra Byrne), Best Original Score (Patrick Doyle) and Best Writing, Adapted Screenplay (Kenneth Branagh).

== Plot ==
Prince Hamlet of Denmark is the son of the recently deceased King Hamlet and nephew of King Claudius, his father's brother and successor. Claudius hastily married King Hamlet's widow Gertrude, Hamlet's mother, and took the throne for himself. Denmark has a longstanding feud with neighbouring Norway, in which King Hamlet slew King Fortinbras of Norway in a battle some years ago. Although Denmark defeated Norway and the Norwegian throne fell to King Fortinbras's infirm brother, Denmark fears that an invasion led by the dead Norwegian king's son, Prince Fortinbras, is imminent.

On a cold night on the ramparts of Elsinore, the Danish royal castle, the sentries Bernardo and Marcellus discuss a ghost resembling the late King Hamlet that they have recently seen, and bring Prince Hamlet's friend Horatio as a witness. After the ghost appears again, the three vow to tell Prince Hamlet what they have witnessed.

As the court gathers the next day while King Claudius and Queen Gertrude discuss affairs of state with their elderly adviser, Polonius, Hamlet watches glumly. During the court, Claudius grants permission for Polonius's son, Laertes, to return to school in France and sends envoys to inform the King of Norway of Fortinbras. Claudius also scolds Hamlet for continuing to grieve over his father and forbids him to return to his schooling in Wittenberg. After the court exits, Hamlet despairs of his father's death and his mother's hasty remarriage. Learning of the ghost from Horatio, Hamlet resolves to see it himself.

As Laertes prepares to depart for a visit to France, Polonius offers him advice that culminates in the maxim, "to thine own self be true". Polonius's daughter, Ophelia, admits that she has interest in Hamlet, but Laertes warns her against seeking the prince's attention, and Polonius orders her to reject his advances. That night on the rampart, the ghost appears to Hamlet, telling the prince that he was murdered by Claudius and demanding that Hamlet avenge him. Hamlet agrees, and the ghost vanishes. The prince confides to Horatio and the sentries that he plans to "put an antic disposition on", or act like he has gone mad, and forces them to swear to keep secret his plans for revenge. However, he remains uncertain of the ghost's reliability.

Soon after, Ophelia rushes to her father, telling him that Hamlet arrived at her door the night before, half-dressed and behaving erratically. Polonius blames the love for Hamlet's madness and resolves to inform Claudius and Gertrude. As he enters to do so, the King and Queen finish welcoming Rosencrantz and Guildenstern, two student acquaintances of Hamlet, to Elsinore. The royal couple has requested that the students investigate the cause of Hamlet's mood and behaviour. Additional news requires that Polonius waits to be heard: messengers from Norway inform Claudius that the King of Norway has rebuked Prince Fortinbras for attempting to re-fight his father's battles. The forces that Fortinbras had conscripted to march against Denmark will instead be sent against Poland, although they will pass through Danish territory to get there.

Polonius tells Claudius and Gertrude of his theory regarding Hamlet's behaviour and speaks to Hamlet in a hall of the castle to try to uncover more information. Hamlet feigns madness and subtly insults Polonius all the while. When Rosencrantz and Guildenstern arrive, Hamlet warmly greets his "friends" but quickly discerns that they are spies. Hamlet admits that he is upset at his situation but refuses to give the true reason, instead commenting on "What a piece of work is a man". Rosencrantz and Guildenstern tell Hamlet that they have brought with them a troupe of actors whom they met while travelling to Elsinore. Hamlet, after welcoming the actors and dismissing his friends-turned-spies, asks them to deliver a soliloquy about the death of King Priam, as witnessed by Queen Hecuba, at the climax of the Trojan War. Impressed by their delivery of the speech, he plots to stage The Murder of Gonzago, a play featuring a death in the style of his father's murder, and to determine the truth of the ghost's story, as well as Claudius's guilt or innocence, by studying Claudius's reaction.

Polonius forces Ophelia to return Hamlet's love letters and tokens of affection to the prince while he and Claudius watch from afar to evaluate Hamlet's reaction. Hamlet is walking alone in the hall as the King and Polonius await Ophelia's entrance, musing whether "to be or not to be". When Ophelia enters and tries to return Hamlet's things, Hamlet accuses her of immodesty and cries "get thee to a nunnery", though it is unclear whether this, too, is a show of madness or genuine distress. His reaction convinces Claudius that Hamlet is not mad for love. Shortly thereafter, the court assembles to watch the play Hamlet has commissioned. After seeing the Player King murdered by his rival pouring poison in his ear, Claudius abruptly rises and runs from the room; for Hamlet, this is proof positive of his uncle's guilt.

Gertrude summons Hamlet to her chamber to demand an explanation. Meanwhile, Claudius talks to himself about the impossibility of repenting, since he still has possession of his ill-gotten goods: his brother's crown and wife. He sinks to his knees. On his way to visit his mother, Hamlet sneaks up behind Claudius but does not kill him, reasoning that killing Claudius while he is praying will send him straight to heaven while the ghost of Hamlet's father is stuck in purgatory. In the queen's bedchamber, Hamlet and Gertrude fight bitterly. Polonius, spying on the conversation from behind a tapestry, calls for help as Gertrude, believing Hamlet wants to kill her, calls out for help herself.

Hamlet, believing it is Claudius, stabs wildly, killing Polonius, but he pulls aside the curtain and sees his error. In a rage, Hamlet brutally insults his mother for her apparent ignorance of Claudius's villainy, but the ghost enters and reprimands Hamlet for his inaction and harsh words. Unable to see or hear the ghost herself, Gertrude takes Hamlet's conversation with it as further evidence of madness. After begging the queen to stop sleeping with Claudius, Hamlet leaves, dragging Polonius's corpse away.

Hamlet jokes with Claudius about where he has hidden Polonius's body, and the King, fearing for his life, sends Rosencrantz and Guildenstern to accompany Hamlet to England with a sealed letter to the King of England requesting that Hamlet be executed immediately.

Unhinged by grief at Polonius's death, Ophelia wanders Elsinore. Laertes arrives back from France, enraged by his father's death and his sister's madness. Claudius convinces Laertes that Hamlet is solely responsible, but a letter soon arrives indicating that Hamlet has returned to Denmark, foiling Claudius's plan. Claudius switches tactics, proposing a fencing match between Laertes and Hamlet to settle their differences. Laertes will be given a poison-tipped foil, and, if that fails, Claudius will offer Hamlet poisoned wine as a congratulation. Gertrude interrupts to report that Ophelia has drowned, though it is unclear whether it was suicide or an accident caused by her madness.

Horatio has received a letter from Hamlet, explaining that the prince escaped by negotiating with pirates who attempted to attack his England-bound ship, and the friends reunite offstage. Two gravediggers discuss Ophelia's apparent suicide while digging her grave. Hamlet arrives with Horatio and banters with one of the gravediggers, who unearths the skull of a jester from Hamlet's childhood, Yorick. Hamlet picks up the skull, saying, "alas, poor Yorick", as he contemplates mortality. Ophelia's funeral procession approaches, led by Laertes. Hamlet and Horatio initially hide, but when Hamlet realizes that Ophelia is the one being buried, he reveals himself, proclaiming his love for her. Laertes and Hamlet fight by Ophelia's graveside, but the brawl is broken up.

Back at Elsinore, Hamlet explains to Horatio that he had discovered Claudius's letter with Rosencrantz and Guildenstern's belongings and replaced it with a forged copy indicating that his former friends should be killed instead of him. A foppish courtier, Osric, interrupts the conversation to deliver the fencing challenge to Hamlet, who, despite Horatio's pleas, accepts it. Hamlet does well at first, leading the match by two hits to none, and Gertrude raises a toast to him using the poisoned glass of wine Claudius had set aside for Hamlet. Claudius tries to stop her but is too late: she drinks, and Laertes realizes the plot will be revealed. Laertes slashes Hamlet with his poisoned blade. In the ensuing scuffle, they switch weapons, and Hamlet wounds Laertes with his own poisoned sword. Gertrude collapses and, claiming she has been poisoned, dies. In his dying moments, Laertes reconciles with Hamlet and reveals Claudius's plan. Hamlet rushes at Claudius and stabs him, before splashing the poison into his face and mouth, killing him.

As the poison takes effect, Hamlet, hearing that Fortinbras is marching through the area, names the Norwegian prince as his successor. Horatio, distraught at the thought of being the last survivor and living while Hamlet does not, says that he will perform suicide by drinking the dregs of Gertrude's poisoned wine, but Hamlet begs him to live and tell his story. Hamlet dies on the floor in front of Horatio, proclaiming "the rest is silence". Fortinbras, who was ostensibly marching toward Poland with his army, arrives at the palace, along with an English ambassador bringing news of Rosencrantz's and Guildenstern's deaths. Horatio promises to recount the full story of what happened, and Fortinbras, seeing the entire Danish royal family dead, takes the crown for himself and orders a military funeral to honour Prince Hamlet.

== Cast ==
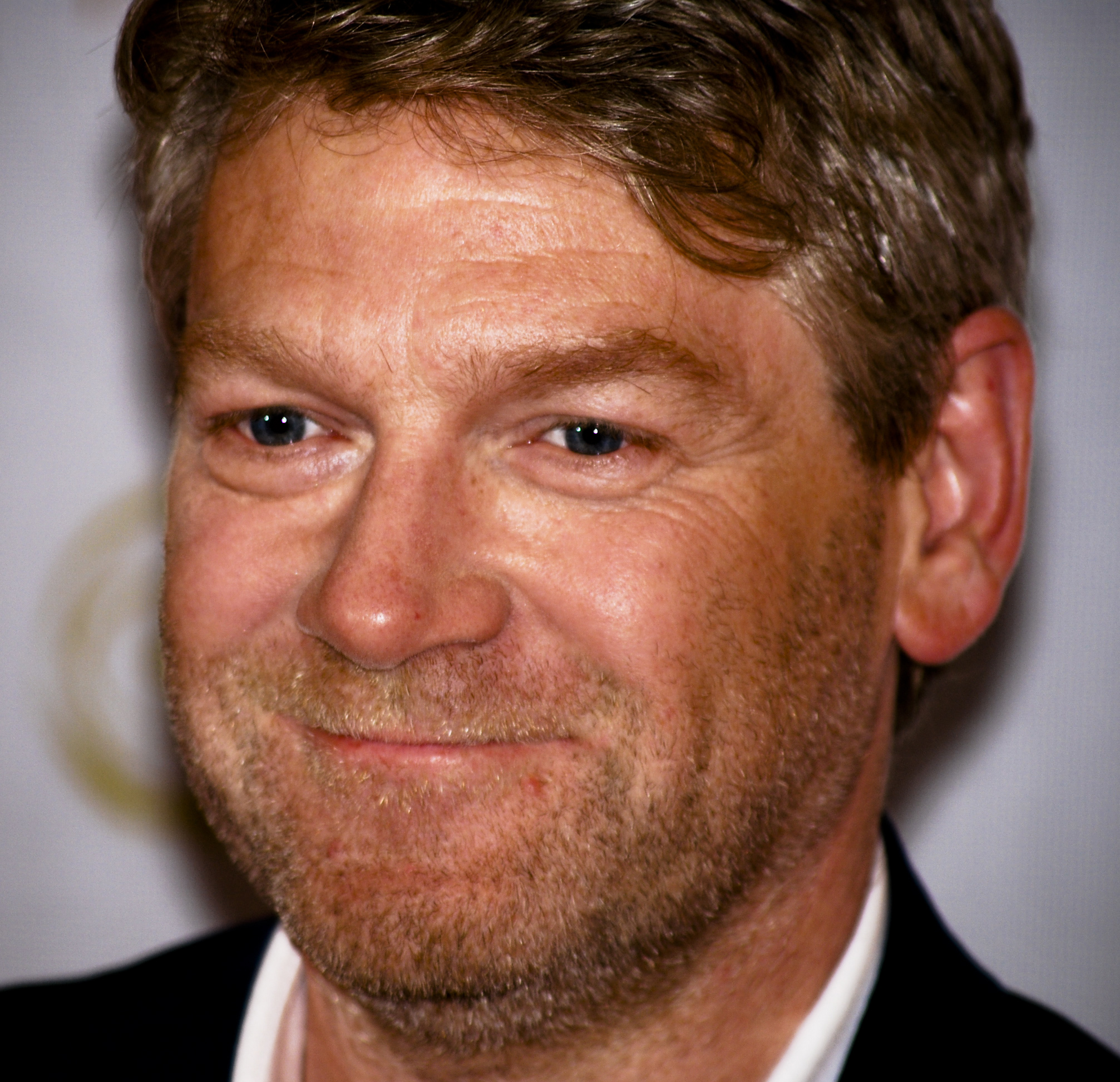
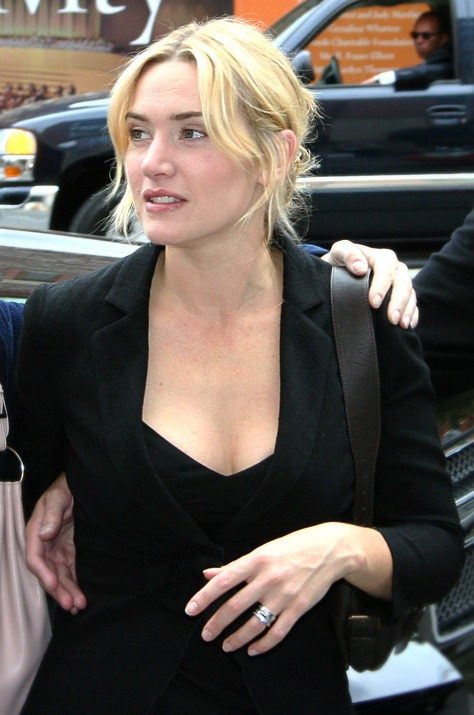
Kenneth Branagh (pictured in 2009), who portrayed Hamlet, and Kate Winslet (in 2006), who portrayed Ophelia

=== Main characters ===
- Kenneth Branagh as Prince Hamlet, the story's protagonist and Prince of Denmark. He is the son of the late King Hamlet and heir to the throne of Denmark. At first, Hamlet is depressed about his father's death and is angered by his mother Gertrude's swift remarriage to his uncle Claudius. However, Hamlet is told by the ghost of his father that Claudius murdered him, usurping his throne. Hamlet swears to avenge his father's murder. Branagh described his interpretation of the title role as considerably less "neurotic" than others, removing the Oedipal fixation prominently featured in Laurence Olivier's 1948 film adaptation, among others. During the scenes in which Hamlet pretends to be insane, Branagh portrayed the Prince as manic.
- Derek Jacobi as King Claudius, the play's antagonist and brother of the late king. He murders his brother by pouring poison into his ear while he sleeps. He usurps his brother's title and marries his widow. At first, believing Hamlet to have been driven mad by the loss of his father, Claudius tries to spy on Hamlet. When Claudius learns that Hamlet knows of the murder, he tries to use Rosencrantz and Guildenstern, two of Hamlet's schoolmates, to murder his nephew. Jacobi appeared in the title role in the BBC's 1980 made-for-television version of Hamlet.
- Julie Christie as Gertrude, Queen of Denmark and wife to both the late King Hamlet and King Claudius, whom she swiftly married following the former's death — ignorant of the foul play that caused his death.
- Richard Briers as Polonius, the Lord Chamberlain. An impertinent busybody, Polonius believes Hamlet to be mad and convinces Claudius to join him in spying on the prince. Hamlet eventually kills him, believing him to be Claudius.
- Kate Winslet as Ophelia, noblewoman of Denmark and daughter of Polonius. Ophelia is in love with Hamlet until she is advised by her father Polonius and brother Laertes to end their relationship. She is eventually driven mad by both Hamlet's rejection and her father's murder and drowns herself.
- Nicholas Farrell as Horatio, a good friend of Hamlet whom he met while attending Wittenberg University.
- Michael Maloney as Laertes, the son of Polonius and brother of Ophelia. After instructing his sister to have no further relations with Hamlet, he departs for Paris. On news of his father's murder, Laertes returns to Denmark, leading a mob to storm the castle. Claudius incites Laertes to kill Hamlet and avenge Polonius's death. He later conspires with Claudius to murder Hamlet during a fencing duel.
- Rufus Sewell as Fortinbras, the Norwegian crown prince. Played mostly in flashback and frequently referenced throughout the film, Fortinbras storms Elsinore castle with his army during the final scene, and assumes the vacant throne of Denmark.

=== Supporting characters ===
- Robin Williams as Osric, the Elsinore courtier sent by Claudius to invite Hamlet to participate in the duel with Laertes.
- Gérard Depardieu as Reynaldo, a servant to Polonius. He is sent by Polonius to Paris to spy on Laertes.
- Timothy Spall as Rosencrantz and Reece Dinsdale as Guildenstern, courtier friends of Hamlet who are sent by Claudius to spy on Hamlet.
- Jack Lemmon as Marcellus and Ian McElhinney as Bernardo, sentries at Elsinore who alert Horatio of the appearance of King Hamlet's Ghost.
- Ray Fearon as Francisco, a sentry at Elsinore and the first character to appear on screen.
- Brian Blessed as the Ghost of Hamlet's Father, an apparition in the form of the late King who informs Hamlet of his murder and Claudius's usurpation of the throne.
- Billy Crystal as the First Gravedigger, a sexton digging Ophelia's grave who makes a case for why she should not receive a Christian burial before having a quick dialogue with Hamlet. Later, he presents the skull of Yorick to Hamlet, not knowing Hamlet's history with the jester.
- Simon Russell Beale as the Second Gravedigger.
- Don Warrington as Voltemand, an ambassador sent by King Claudius to Old King Norway.
- Ravil Isyanov as Cornelius, an ambassador sent by King Claudius to Old King Norway.
- Charlton Heston as the Player King.
- Rosemary Harris as the Player Queen.
- Ben Thom and Perdita Weeks as other Players.
- Richard Attenborough as the English Ambassador.
- Angela Douglas as Gertrude's Attendant.
- John Gielgud as Priam, the King of Troy, played in flashback during the Player King's speech.
- Judi Dench as Hecuba, the Queen of Troy and wife of Priam, played in flashback during the Player King's speech.
- John Mills as Old King Norway, uncle of Fortinbras, played in flashback, reprimanding his nephew for claims against Denmark.
- Ken Dodd as Yorick, the King's Jester, played in flashback entertaining the royals of Elsinore during the gravediggers scene.
- Jeffery Kissoon as Fortinbras' Captain
- Jimi Mistry and David Yip as Sailors
- John Spencer-Churchill, 11th Duke of Marlborough, appears in a cameo as the Norwegian captain.

== Production ==
=== Origins ===
Aspects of the film's staging were based on Adrian Noble's Royal Shakespeare Company production of the play, in which Branagh played the title role. Branagh, Jacobi, and Briers had also played the same characters in a 1992 BBC Radio production.

=== Text ===
The film uses a conflated text based on the 1623 First Folio, with additions from the Second Quarto and amendments from other sources. According to a note appended to the published screenplay:

The screenplay is based on the text of Hamlet as it appears in the First Folio – the edition of Shakespeare's plays collected by his theatrical associates Heminges and Condell and published in 1623 by a syndicate of booksellers. Nothing has been cut from this text, and some passages absent from it (including the soliloquy "How all occasions do inform against me ...") have been supplied from the Second Quarto (an edition of the play which exists in copies dated 1604 and 1605). We have also incorporated some readings of words and phrases from this source and from other early printed texts, and in a few cases emendations from modern editors of the play. Thus in I, 4, in the passage (from the Second Quarto) about the "dram of eale", we use an emendation from the Oxford edition of the Complete Works (edited by Stanley Wells and Gary Taylor, 1988): "doth all the noble substance over-daub" – rather than the original's "of a doubt".

=== Style ===
Despite using a full text, Branagh's film is also very visual; it makes frequent use of flashbacks to depict scenes that are described but not performed in Shakespeare's text, such as Hamlet's childhood friendship with Yorick, or scenes merely implied by the play's text, such as Hamlet's sexual relationship with Ophelia. The film also uses very long single takes for numerous scenes.

In a radical departure from previous Hamlet films, Branagh set the internal scenes in a vibrantly colourful setting, featuring a throne room dominated by mirrored doors. Film scholar Samuel Crowl called the setting "film noir with all the lights on". Branagh chose Victorian era costuming and furnishings, using Blenheim Palace, built in the early 18th century as the seat of the Dukes of Marlborough, as Elsinore Castle for the external scenes. Harry Keyishan has suggested that the film is structured as an epic, courting comparison with Ben-Hur, The Ten Commandments and Doctor Zhivago. As J. Lawrence Guntner pointed out, comparisons with the latter are heightened by the presence of Julie Christie (Zhivago's Lara) as Gertrude.

=== Filming ===
Hamlet was shot in Panavision Super 70 by Alex Thomson. It was the last feature film to be entirely shot in 70 mm until production of Samsara in 2011. Branagh was among the few to use 65mm film cameras after that, on his 2017 film Murder on the Orient Express. The filming was done from 25 January to 12 April 1996. Principal photography took place at Shepperton Studios, with location filming at Blenheim Palace in Oxfordshire.

== Music ==
William Shakespeare's Hamlet: Original Motion Picture Soundtrack

Soundtrack album by Patrick Doyle
- Released: 10 December 1996
- Recorded: 1996
- Genre: Soundtrack
- Length: 76:25
- Label: Sony Classical Records
- Producers: Patrick Doyle; Maggie Rodford

Professional ratings
Review scores
Source	Rating
AllMusic	link
Film Music on the Web	link
Filmtracks	link

The score of Hamlet was composed and co-produced by Branagh's frequent collaborator Patrick Doyle, and conducted by Robert Ziegler. Doyle composed three primary themes for the film to accompany the characters of Ophelia, Claudius and Hamlet, which are varied throughout the score. The "simple, childlike" theme for Ophelia is mostly string-dominant, often performed by a string quartet yet occasionally accompanied by a full string ensemble or mixed chorus. For Claudius, Doyle composed a theme in the form of a demented canon, using more 20th-century harmonies. The theme for Hamlet was considered by Doyle to be "the most daunting and elusive" to conceive, before settling on a more "simple" motif to accompany the contemplative character.

The soundtrack album was released on 10 December 1996 through Sony Classical Records and features 26 tracks, with a running time of more than 76 minutes. For his work on the film, Doyle received an Academy Award nomination for Best Original Score.

1. In Pace (3:07) – performed by Plácido Domingo (heard in the film during the closing credits)
2. Fanfare (0:48)
3. "All that lives must die" (2:40)
4. "To thine own self be true" (3:04)
5. The Ghost (9:55)
6. "Give me up the truth" (1:05)
7. "What a piece of work is a man" (1:50)
8. "What players are they" (1:33)
9. "Out out thou strumpet fortune" (3:11)
10. "To be, or not to be" (1:53)
11. "I loved you once" (3:27)
12. "Oh, what a noble mind" (2:41)
13. "If once a widow" (3:36)
14. "Now could I drink hot blood" (6:57)
15. "A foolish prating nave" (1:05)
16. "Oh heavy deed" (0:56)
17. "Oh here they come" (4:39)
18. "My thoughts be bloody" (2:52)
19. "The doors are broke" (1:20)
20. "And will 'a not come again?" (1:59)
21. "Alas poor Yorick" (2:49)
22. "Sweets to the sweet – farewell" (4:39)
23. "Give me your pardon sir" (1:24)
24. "Part them they are incensed" (1:47)
25. "Goodnight, sweet prince" (3:36)
26. "Go bid the soldiers shoot" (2:52)

== Release ==
Hamlet was screened out of competition at the 1997 Cannes Film Festival. A shorter edit of the Branagh film, at approximately two and a half hours in length, was also shown in some markets.

=== Home media ===
A two-disc DVD set was released in the United States and Canada on 14 August 2007. It includes a full-length commentary by Branagh and Shakespeare scholar Russell Jackson. A Blu-ray was released on 17 August 2010 in the United States and Canada with similar additional features, including an introduction by Kenneth Branagh, the featurette "To Be on Camera: A History with Hamlet", the 1996 Cannes Film Festival Promo, and a Shakespeare Movies Trailer Gallery.

== Reception ==
=== Box office ===
Hamlet flopped at the box office, mostly due to its limited release. The film earned more than $90,000 in its opening weekend playing on three screens. It made more than $30,000 in the Czech Republic, and more than $545,000 in Spain. It ultimately had a maximum release of 93 theaters in the United States, grossing a total of only $4,710,000 domestically on a budget of $18 million.

=== Critical response ===
Hamlet received positive reviews. It currently holds a 95% rating at Rotten Tomatoes, based on 57 reviews. The consensus reads: "Kenneth Branagh's sprawling, finely textured adaptation of Shakespeare's masterpiece lives up to its source material, using strong performances and a sharp cinematic focus to create a powerfully resonant film that wastes none of its 246 minutes."

Roger Ebert, film critic of the Chicago Sun-Times, awarded the film four stars out of four, comparing it to Laurence Olivier's lauded 1948 version, stating, "Branagh's Hamlet lacks the narcissistic intensity of Laurence Olivier's (in the 1948 Academy Award winner), but the film as a whole is better, placing Hamlet in the larger context of royal politics, and making him less a subject for pity."

Janet Maslin of The New York Times also praised both Branagh's direction and performance, writing, "This Hamlet, like Branagh's version of Much Ado About Nothing, takes a frank, try-anything approach to sustaining its entertainment value, but its gambits are most often evidence of Branagh's solid showmanship. His own performance is the best evidence of all."

The New York Review of Books praised the attention given to Shakespeare's language, "giving the meter of the verse a musician's respect"; Branagh said that his aim was "telling the story with utmost clarity and simplicity".

Some critics, notably Stanley Kauffmann, declared the film to be the finest motion picture version of Hamlet. Online film critic James Berardinelli gave the film a four-star review and declared that the Branagh Hamlet is the finest Shakespeare adaptation, rating it as the best film of 1996, the fourth best film of the 1990s, and one of his top 101 favourite films of all time, saying, "From the moment it was first announced that Branagh would attempt an unabridged Hamlet, I never doubted that it would be a worthy effort... I have seen dozens of versions of this play, and none has ever held me in such a grip of awe."

The film did have its detractors, however. Lloyd Rose of The Washington Post called it "the film equivalent of a lushly illustrated coffee-table book". Desson Thomson wrote of Branagh's performance that "the choices he makes are usually overextended. When it's time to be funny, he skitters over the top. When he's sad or touched, he makes a mechanical, catching noise in his throat."

John Simon called Branagh's performance "brawny" and "not easy to like" and said that Branagh's direction used "explicitness where Shakespeare... settled for subtlety or mere suggestion". Similarly, Chris Davis of the Memphis Flyer said the detailed lavish setting makes the language too literal and redundant compared to a stage, and that modest low-budget adaptations like H4 and Much Ado About Nothing (2012) can have much more life.

Leonard Maltin, who gave the film a positive three stars in his Movie and Video Guide (and gave the Olivier version of Hamlet four stars), praised the cinematography by Alex Thomson, but stated that "Branagh essentially gives a stage performance that is nearly as over-the-top as some of his directorial touches".

Kenneth Branagh's Hamlet ranks number 3 on the Rotten Tomatoes list of Greatest Shakespeare Movies, behind Akira Kurosawa's Ran (1985, based on King Lear), which ranks in second place, and Branagh's Henry V (1989), which ranks in first place.

=== Accolades ===
Award	Category	Nominee	Result
Academy Awards	Best Writing (Adapted Screenplay)	Kenneth Branagh	Nominated
Academy Awards	Best Art Direction	Tim Harvey	Nominated
Academy Awards	Best Costume Design	Alexandra Byrne	Nominated
Academy Awards	Best Original Dramatic Score	Patrick Doyle	Nominated
Art Directors Guild Awards	ADG Excellence in Production Design Award	Tim Harvey, Desmond Crowe	Nominated
British Academy Film Awards	Best Costume Design	Alexandra Byrne	Nominated
British Academy Film Awards	Best Production Design	Tim Harvey	Nominated
British Society of Cinematographers	GBCT Operators Award	Martin Kenzie	Won
British Society of Cinematographers	Best Cinematography Award	Alex Thomson	Won
Broadcast Film Critics Association Awards	Best Film	Kenneth Branagh	Nominated
The International Film Festival of the Art of Cinematography CAMERIMAGE	Golden Frog Award for Best Cinematography	Alex Thomson	Nominated
Chicago Film Critics Association Awards	Best Actor	Kenneth Branagh	Nominated
Empire Awards	Best British Actress	Kate Winslet	Won
Evening Standard British Film Awards	Special Jury Award	Kenneth Branagh	Won
San Diego Film Critics Society Awards	Best Actor	Kenneth Branagh	Won
Satellite Awards	Best Art Direction and Production Design	Tim Harvey	Nominated
Satellite Awards	Best Cinematography	Alex Thomson	Nominated
Satellite Awards	Best Costume Design	Alex Byrne	Nominated
Satellite Awards	Best Original Score	Patrick Doyle	Nominated
Satellite Awards	Best Supporting Actress – Motion Picture	Kate Winslet	Nominated

== See also ==
- Hamlet in performance
- Hamlet on screen
