= Characters in Hamlet =

Dramatis personae of the Shakespeare tragedy

What follows is an overview of the main characters in William Shakespeare's Hamlet, followed by a list and summary of the minor characters from the play. Three different early versions of the play survive: known as the First Quarto ("Q1"), Second Quarto ("Q2"), and First Folio ("F1"), each has lines—and even scenes—missing in the others, and some character names vary.

== Overview of main characters ==
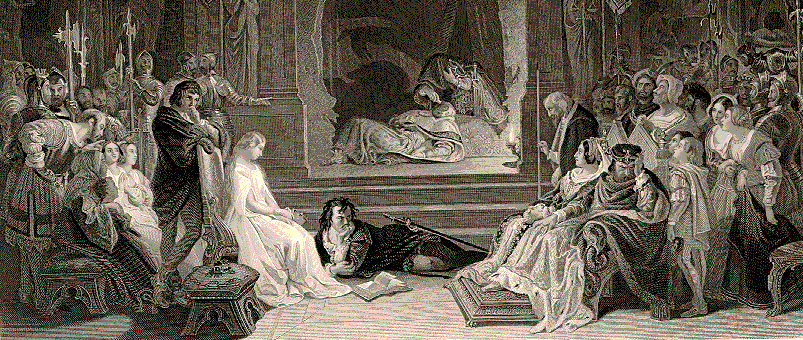
A detail of the engraving of Daniel Maclise's 1842 painting The Play-scene in Hamlet, portraying the moment when the guilt of Claudius is revealed

- Hamlet is the Prince of Denmark; he is son to the late King Hamlet, and nephew to the present King Claudius.
- Claudius is the King of Denmark, elected to the throne after the death of his brother, King Hamlet. Claudius has married Gertrude, his brother's widow.
- Gertrude is the Queen of Denmark, and King Hamlet's widow, now married to Claudius, and mother to Hamlet.
- The Ghost appears in the image of Hamlet's father, the late King Hamlet (Old Hamlet).
- Polonius ("Corambis" in "Q1") is Claudius's chief counsellor, and the father of Ophelia and Laertes.
- Laertes is the son of Polonius, and has returned to Elsinore from Paris.
- Ophelia is the daughter of Polonius, and Laertes's sister, who lives with her father at Elsinore. She is in love with Hamlet.
- Horatio is a good friend of Hamlet, from the university at Wittenberg, who came to Elsinore Castle to attend King Hamlet's funeral.
- Rosencrantz and Guildenstern are childhood friends and schoolmates of Hamlet, who were summoned to Elsinore by Claudius and Gertrude.
- Fortinbras is the crown prince of Norway, and assumes the throne of Denmark after Hamlet's death.

== Elsinore sentries ==
=== Marcellus, Barnardo and Francisco ===
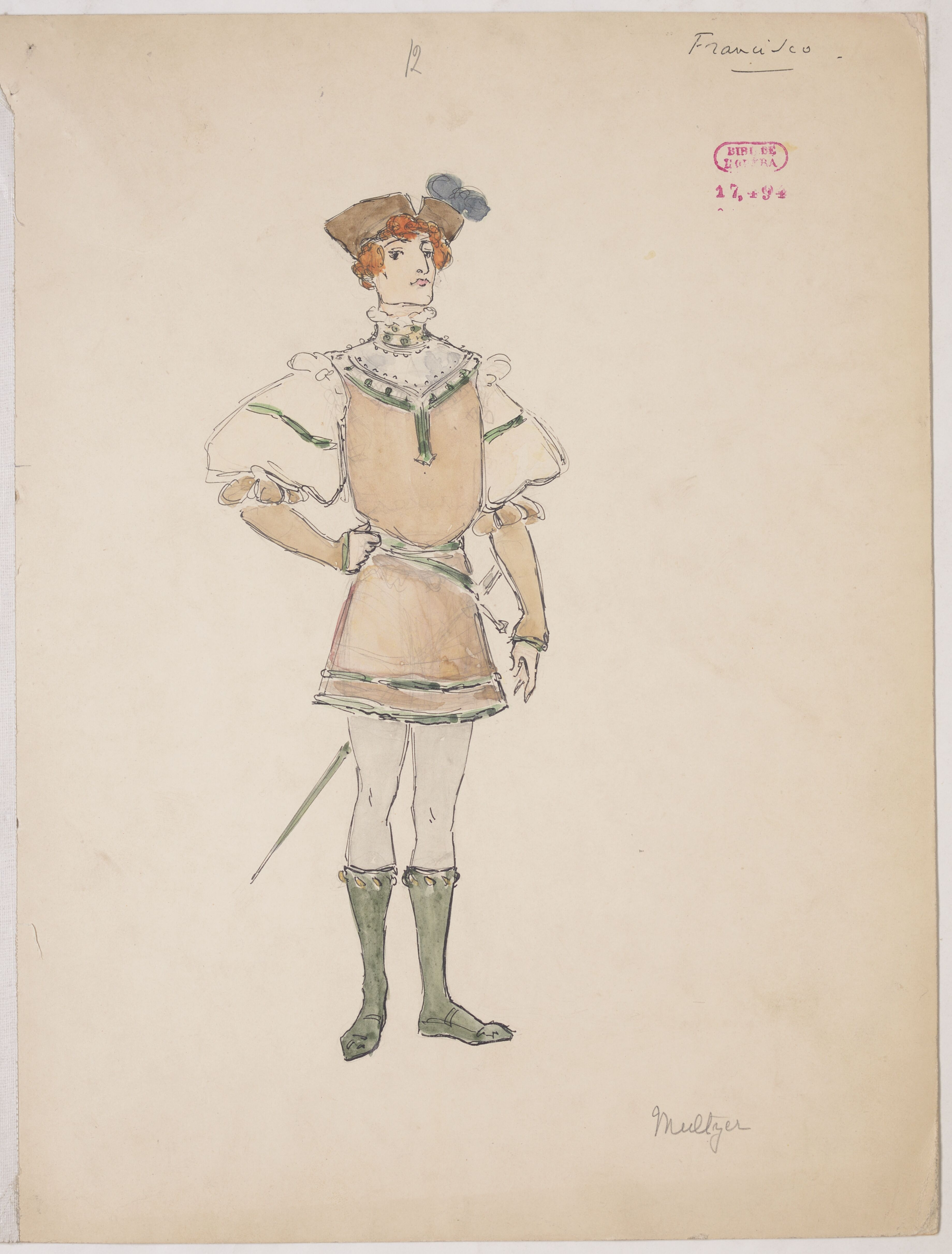
Sketch for a costume for Francisco, by Marcel Mültzer

Marcellus, Bernardo and Francisco are sentries at Elsinore. Francisco gives up his watch to Bernardo in the opening of the play, and it is Bernardo and Marcellus, who first alert Horatio to the appearance of King Hamlet's Ghost. Marcellus goes with Horatio to tell Hamlet about the Ghost's appearance. Marcellus is the most prominent of the three.

Barnardo (in F1) is spelled Bernardo in Q2 (Second Quarto) and Barnard in Q1 (First Quarto).

== Elsinore entourage ==
=== Voltemand and Cornelius ===
Voltemand and Cornelius are ambassadors sent by the King of Denmark, Claudius, to old King Norway.

=== Reynaldo ===
He is a servant to Polonius. (In the "Q1" text, Reynaldo is called "Montano" and Polonius is called "Corambis.") Polonius sends Reynaldo to Paris to spy on what Laertes is doing.

=== A Gentleman ===
He informs Gertrude of Ophelia's strange change in behaviour, before Ophelia's first "mad" appearance.

=== Osric ===
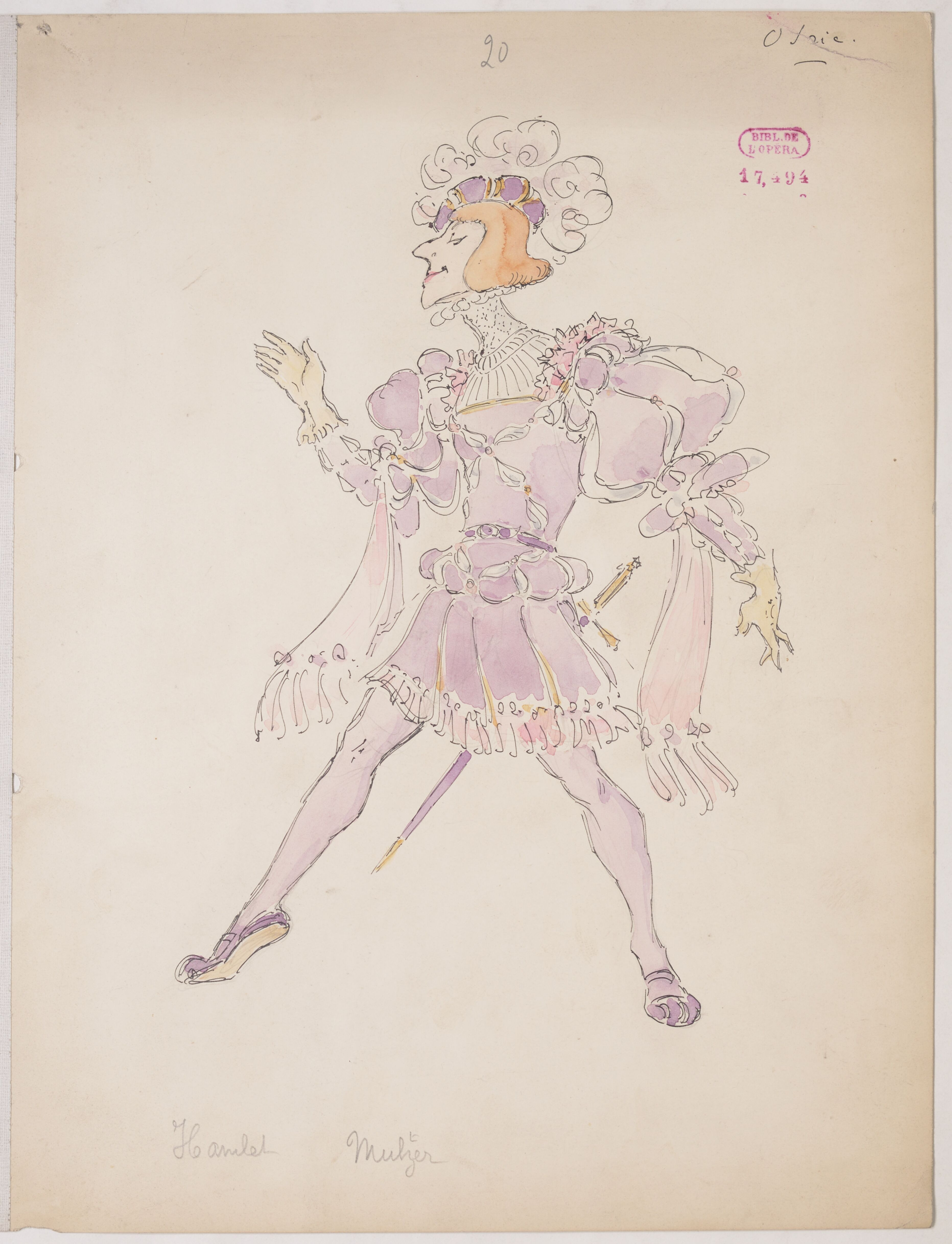
Sketch for a costume for Osric, by Marcel Mültzer

He is the courtier sent by Claudius to invite Hamlet to participate in the duel with Laertes. (His name is spelled "Ostricke" in the Second Quarto.) Osric, as well as Polonius, attempts to engage with Hamlet in the elaborate, witty discourse, fully consistent with Baldassare Castiglione's 1528 work, The Courtier. This work outlines several courtly rules, specifically advising royal retainers to amuse their masters with inventive language.

== The Players ==
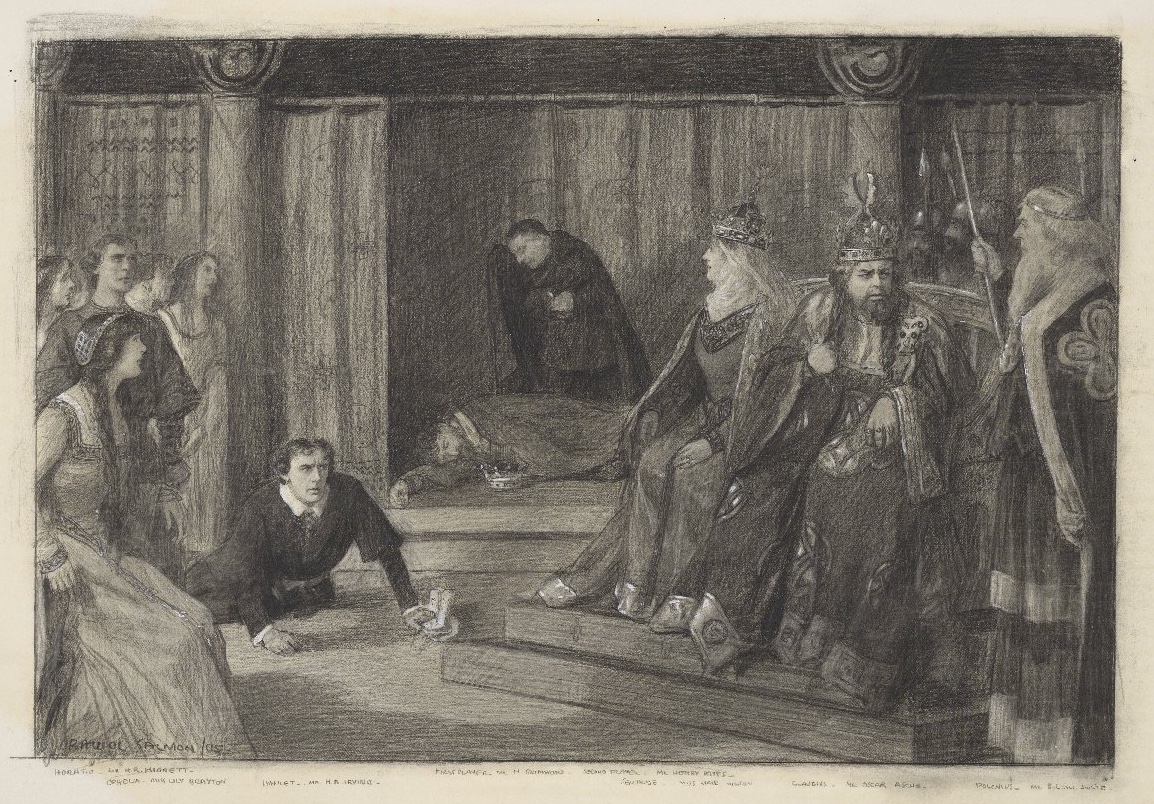
The performance of The Murder of Gonzago, illustrated by A J Balliol Salmon, 1905: the players at left, the court at right.

The Players are a company of actors who arrive at Elsinore Castle. Friends of Hamlet, they had earlier performed in "the city" (presumably Copenhagen), but faced stiff competition from boy performers, so they have traveled to Elsinore to offer Hamlet their services. At Elsinore, they perform a version—which Hamlet has modified and called The Mousetrap—of the play The Murder of Gonzago in the "play within a play".

=== First Player or Player King ===
He is the leader of the troupe of touring actors. In the "play within a play", he takes the part of the king who is murdered.

=== Second Player or Player Queen ===
This role was traditionally performed by a boy, as were all the female parts in Hamlet, since women did not appear on stage in Elizabethan times.

=== Third Player ===
He is also called Lucianus in the "play within a play". The name may be a reference to Lucius in the Brutus legend, a source for Saxo Grammaticus' Gesta Danorum, itself a candidate source for Hamlet. Plays the role similar to Claudius and kills the king by pouring poison into his ear.

=== Fourth Player ===
The Mousetrap play-within-a-play has a very brief Prologue recited by one of the Players. The First Player may do the Prologue, but if not, a Fourth Player, with a speaking part, is required to do it.

== Ophelia's funeral ==
=== Two Clowns (a sexton gravedigger, and a bailiff) ===
The bailiff informs the sexton that Ophelia's death was suicide, but the sexton argues the point. Later, the sexton unearths Yorick's skull, which leads to Hamlet's famous "Alas, poor Yorick" speech. During the Interregnum, all theatres were closed down by the puritan government. However, even during this time playlets known as drolls were often performed illegally, including one based on the two clowns, called The Grave-Makers, based on Act 5, Scene 1 of Hamlet.

=== Yorick ===
Yorick is an unseen character depicted as a skull unearthed by the Gravediggers. The sight of Yorick's skull evokes a reminiscence by Prince Hamlet of the man, who apparently played a role during Hamlet's upbringing.

=== A Priest ===
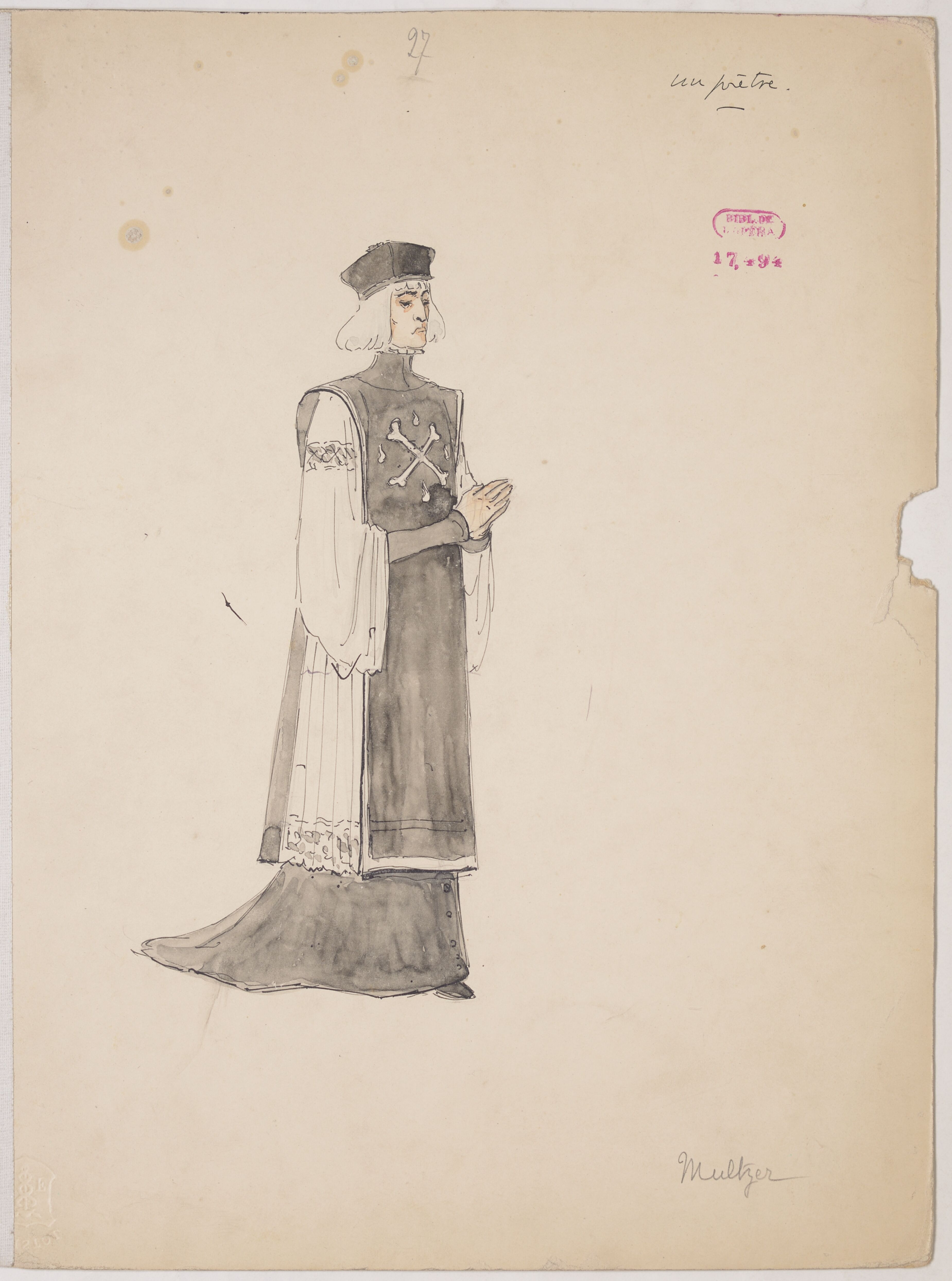
Design for a costume for the Priest in Hamlet, by Marcel Mültzer, 1908.

He officiates at Ophelia's funeral, and does not give her full Christian burial rites, since the church suspects her death was suicide.

== Other characters ==
=== A Captain ===
He is a commander in Fortinbras' invading army, and is assigned by Fortinbras to get the license from Claudius for Fortinbras's army to be in Denmark.

=== Sailors (pirates) ===
The sailors are two pirates who deliver a letter from Hamlet to Horatio, informing Horatio that Hamlet has returned to Denmark.

=== English Ambassadors ===
They appear in the final scene to report that Rosencrantz and Guildenstern are dead.
