= Robert Curtis (actor) =

British actor

- Born: Robert David Curtis; Nuneaton, Warwickshire, England
- Occupation: Actor
- Years active: 2003–present
- Notable work: Doctor Who (2015); Hamlet; Outlander (2016)
- Website: robertcurtis.co.uk

Robert Curtis is a British actor. He is best known for his role as Scratch in the Doctor Who Christmas special The Husbands of River Song (2015), Aaron in EastEnders (2012) and Lieutenant Barnes in Outlander. Curtis trained at The Royal Central School of Speech and Drama.

== Career ==
=== Television ===
- Doctor Who
- Doctors
- EastEnders
- The Sarah Jane Adventures
- Outlander

=== Film ===
- The Rendlesham UFO Incident (released in the U.S as Hangar 10) (2014)
- Hamlet (2009)

=== Theatre ===
- For the Royal Shakespeare Company 2008 season: A Midsummer Night's Dream; Love's Labours Lost; Hamlet
- Harry Potter and the Cursed Child in London

=== Other theatre credits include ===
- Love Me Do
- Joking Apart
- The Butterfly Lion
- The Blue Room
- The Madness of King George III
- Romeo & Juliet
- The Comedy of Errors
- A Midsummer Night's Dream
- Sweethearts
- The Importance of Being Earnest
