= Rosencrantz and Guildenstern =

Characters in Shakespeare's Hamlet

- Hamlet characters
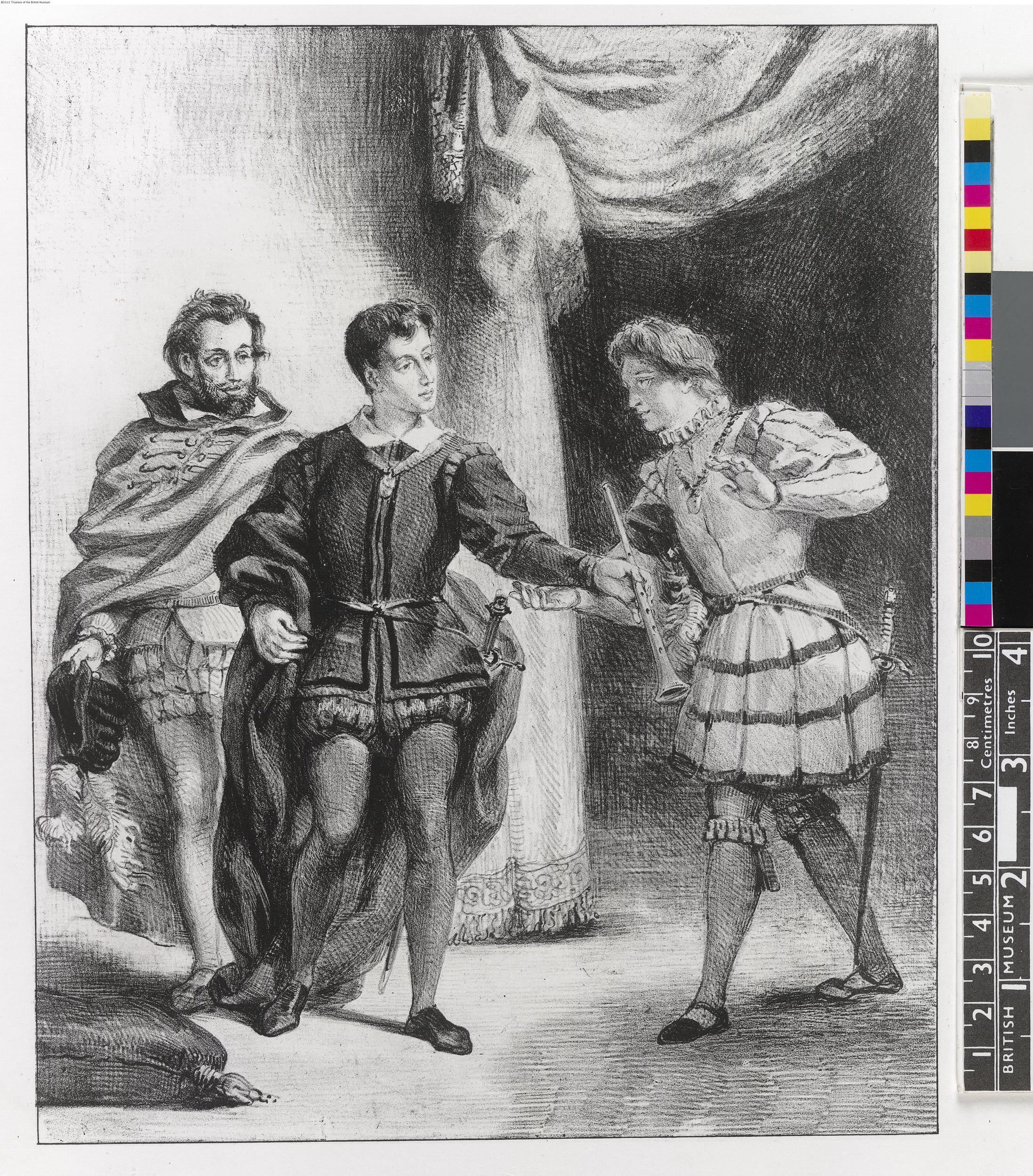
- A lithograph of Rosencrantz and Guildenstern in the flute scene from Hamlet by Eugène Delacroix
- Created by: William Shakespeare
- Based on: Possibly named for Frederik Rosenkrantz and Knud Gyldenstierne
- Portrayed by: Rosencrantz: Leonard Sachs; Timothy Spall; John Stride; Adrian Scarborough; Brian Murray; Dominic Monaghan; Tim Minchin; Eckart Dux; Gary Oldman; Igor Dmitriev; Ben Aris; Michael Maloney; Steve Zahn; Guildenstern: Erik Chitty; Edward Petherbridge; Simon Russell Beale; Joshua McGuire; Toby Schmitz; Tim Roth; Clive Graham; Reece Dinsdale

In-universe information
- Occupation: University students
- Affiliation: Initially loyal to Prince Hamlet, then switched to King Claudius
- Nationality: Danish

Rosencrantz (/ˈroʊzənˌkræntz/) and Guildenstern (/ˈɡɪldənˌstɜːrn/) are characters in William Shakespeare's tragedy Hamlet. They are childhood friends of Hamlet, summoned by King Claudius to distract the prince from his apparent madness and if possible to ascertain the cause of it. The characters were revived in W. S. Gilbert's satire, Rosencrantz and Guildenstern, and as the alienated heroes of Tom Stoppard's absurdist play, Rosencrantz and Guildenstern Are Dead, which was adapted into a film.

== Shakespeare's Hamlet ==
=== Names ===
Rosencrantz ("rose wreath") and Gyldenstjerne/Gyllenstierna ("golden star") were names of Scandinavian noble families of the 16th century; records of the Danish royal coronation of 1596 show that one tenth of the aristocrats participating bore one or the other name.

James Voelkel suggests that the characters were named after Frederik Rosenkrantz and Knud Gyldenstierne, cousins of Tycho Brahe who had visited England in 1592. When James VI and I visited Norway and Denmark in 1589, he met Tycho Brahe and Henrik Gyldenstierne, captain of Bohus. In a gift exchange, Gyldenstierne gave James VI a firearm and a sword, and James VI gave him a ring and a gold chain. When James VI was at Elsinore (Kronborg), a servant of Axel Gyldenstierne, captain of Akershus, was rewarded for bringing letters to the Scottish king.

The majority of characters in Hamlet have classical names, in contrast to the "particularly Danish" ones of Rosencrantz and Guildenstern. The names were common in the court of Frederick II and Christian IV, and also at the University of Wittenberg, an institution where Hamlet is mentioned as having studied (he refers to them as "my two schoolfellows").

=== Appearances ===
In Hamlet, Rosencrantz and Guildenstern always appear as a pair, except in editions following the First Folio text, where Guildenstern enters four lines after Rosencrantz in Act IV, Scene 3.

The two courtiers first appear in Act II, Scene 2, where they attempt to place themselves in the confidence of Prince Hamlet, their childhood friend. The smooth and courtly language they employ immediately establishes them as sycophants really serving as spies for the corrupt King Claudius, Hamlet's uncle, who usurped the throne and constantly attempts to check his nephew. Hamlet welcomes them as "excellent good friends", but, seeing through their guise, comments that they won't "deal justly" with him about their mission. Realising that he lacks allies except for Horatio, Hamlet gives the speech "What a piece of work is a man" to Rosencrantz and Guildenstern.

In Act III, Hamlet seems to drop the pretense of friendship, coldly dismissing the two in Scene 2. Line 319 is perhaps his only use of the royal "we" in the play, although he may also be addressing the other person present on the stage, Horatio, with whom Hamlet first saw the ghost they are discussing. To his mother, he comments in Scene 4 that "I will trust [them] as I will adders fang'd."

When Hamlet kills Polonius, Claudius recruits Rosencrantz and Guildenstern to escort Hamlet to England, providing them with a letter for the King of England instructing him to have Hamlet killed. (They are apparently unaware of what is in the letter, though Shakespeare never explicitly says so.) Along the journey, the distrustful Hamlet finds and rewrites the letter, instructing the executioner to kill Rosencrantz and Guildenstern instead. When their ship is attacked by pirates, Hamlet returns to Denmark, leaving Rosencrantz and Guildenstern to die; he comments in Act V, Scene 2 that "They are not near my conscience; their defeat / Does by their own insinuation grow." Ambassadors returning later report that "Rosencrantz and Guildenstern are dead."

=== Function ===
As agents of the corruption infecting the court, Rosencrantz and Guildenstern contribute to setting up the confrontation between Hamlet and Claudius. Shakespeare expects the audience to appreciate the poetic justice of their deaths: while they are very likely ignorant of the deadly contents of the letter they carry to England and are, to that extent, innocent victims of Hamlet's retaliation, they are seen as having received their just deserts for their participation in Claudius's intrigues.

== Gilbert's Rosencrantz and Guildenstern ==
W. S. Gilbert's play (1874) is a comedy in which Rosencrantz plots with his friend Guildenstern to get rid of Hamlet, so that Rosencrantz can marry Ophelia. They discover that Claudius has written a play. The king's literary work is so embarrassingly bad that Claudius has decreed that anyone who mentions it must be executed. They obtain the manuscript and convince Hamlet to perform it. When he does, Claudius decrees that he must die, but is eventually persuaded to banish him to England. Rosencrantz and Ophelia can now be together.

== Stoppard's Rosencrantz and Guildenstern Are Dead ==
As the protagonists of Tom Stoppard's play and the film based on it, they are confused by the events of Hamlet and seem unaware of their role in the larger drama. The play is primarily a comedy, but they often stumble upon deep philosophical truths through their nonsensical ramblings. In the movie, Rosencrantz invents the sandwich, and discovers gravity and volume displacement, among other things. The characters depart from their epiphanies as quickly as they come to them.

At times, one appears more enlightened than the other—but they trade this enlightenment back and forth throughout the drama. Stoppard also littered his play with jokes that refer to the common thespian tendency to swap Rosencrantz and Guildenstern in the midst of the play because the characters are basically identical. He does this by making Rosencrantz and Guildenstern unsure of which is which, as well as having the other players (Claudius, Hamlet, Gertrude) refer to them frequently by the wrong names.

Because of the play's similarity to Waiting for Godot, Rosencrantz is sometimes compared to Estragon (one of the tramps who wait for Godot), and who shares his dim perception of reality, while Guildenstern parallels Vladimir, who shares his analytical perception.

== See also ==
- Rosencrantz and Guildenstern Are Undead
- Timon and Pumbaa
