= Laertes (Hamlet) =

Character in Hamlet

- Hamlet character
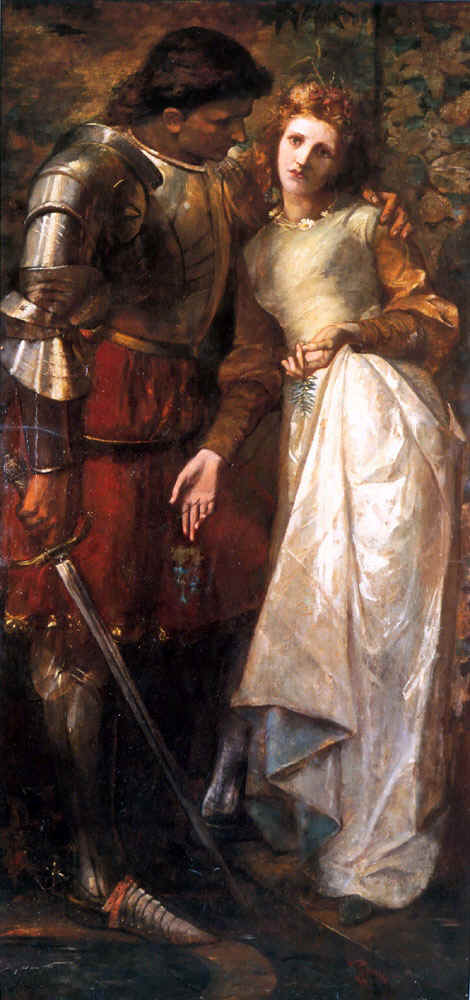
- Laertes and Ophelia by W. G. Wills
- Created by: William Shakespeare
- Portrayed by: Terence Morgan; John Cullum; Nicholas Jones; Nathaniel Parker; Hugh Bonneville; Michael Maloney; Liev Schreiber; Edward Bennett; Kobna Holdbrook-Smith; Luke Thompson; Tom Felton

In-universe information
- Occupation: University student
- Family: Polonius (father); Ophelia (sister)
- Nationality: Danish

Laertes /leɪˈɜːrtiːz/ is a character in William Shakespeare's play Hamlet. Polonius' son and Ophelia's brother, in the final scene, he mortally stabs Hamlet with a poison-tipped sword to avenge the deaths of his father and sister, for which he blames Hamlet. While dying of the same poison, he implicates King Claudius.

The Laertes character is thought to be originated by Shakespeare, as there is no equivalent character in any of the known sources for the play. His name is taken from Laërtes, father of Odysseus in Homer's Odyssey.

== Role in the play ==
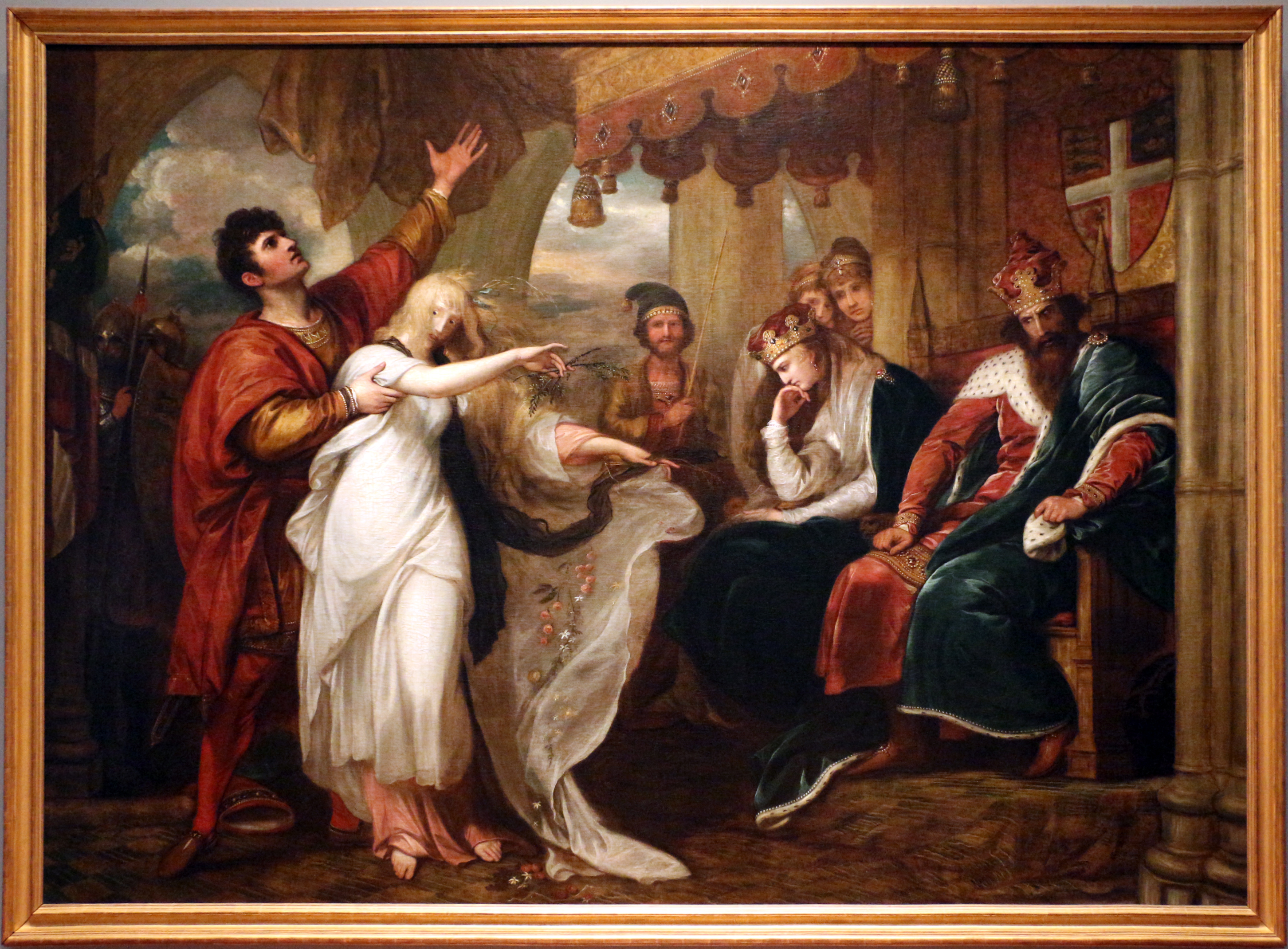
Insanity of Ophelia with Her Brother before the King and Queen (Benjamin West, 1792). Laertes is at far left in red.

In the first act, Laertes warns Ophelia against Hamlet's romantic attentions, saying that Hamlet will soon lose his desire for her, and that it is not Hamlet's own choice but the king's as to whom he will marry. Before Laertes returns to France from Denmark, (having returned to Denmark only to attend the coronation of King Claudius), his father, Polonius, gives him advice to behave himself in France.

During Laertes's absence, Hamlet kills Polonius in Gertrude's closet (act 3 scene 4). Laertes, informed of his father's death, returns to Denmark, and leads a mob to storm and take the castle (act 4 scene 5). Laertes confronts the King, believing him responsible for Polonius's death. The King explains to him who the real killer was, and incites Laertes to kill Hamlet and avenge Polonius's death.

When Ophelia appears in her mad condition, Laertes laments, saying that if she had her wits she could not persuade him more to revenge. Later, Laertes is informed of her death. She had climbed into a willow tree that hung over a brook, and then fell into the water when a branch broke. Too insane to save herself, she drowned. His sister's death strengthens Laertes's resolve to kill Hamlet. In act 5 scene 1, at Ophelia's funeral, Laertes asks why the normal Christian burial ceremony is not being carried out for his sister, and rebukes the priest for questioning her innocence. He leaps into her grave and begs the attendants to bury him with her. Hamlet, who was previously watching from afar, advances and himself leaps into Ophelia's grave. When Laertes attacks Hamlet, the two have to be held back – at the king's command – to avoid a fight.

I dare damnation. To this point I stand,
That both the worlds I give to negligence,
Let come what comes, only I'll be revenged
Most throughly for my father.

— Laertes, Hamlet

In the next scene (act 5 scene 2), King Claudius arranges a fencing match between Hamlet and Laertes. Laertes uses his sharp, poisoned sword instead of a bated (dull) sword. The King provides a poisoned drink as a backup measure. Before the match begins, Hamlet apologises publicly to Laertes for the wrongs he has dealt him. Laertes accepts the apology, so he says, but he proceeds with the scheme to kill Hamlet (though after Gertrude drinks the poisoned drink, he expresses having an attack of conscience). Hamlet is eventually wounded with the poisoned sword. Then, in a scuffle, the swords are switched. Hamlet wounds Laertes with his own poisoned blade, and Laertes then falls as well. Only then does he truly seem to feel guilty, for he tells Osric he has been "justly killed" with his own treachery. As he lies dying, Laertes confesses the truth and reveals that it was Claudius's plot; this results in Hamlet killing Claudius. Laertes asks Hamlet for forgiveness, absolving him of his and his father's deaths if Hamlet absolves him of his own. Hamlet does so, dying shortly after Laertes does.

Other characters' views of Laertes vary widely. Polonius feels a need to send a servant to France to spy on his son's behaviour. Ophelia tells him not to be a hypocrite (in telling her to behave herself with Hamlet, but then being immoral himself in France). Hamlet is at first puzzled by Laertes's hatred for him, but later admits that he sees his own cause displayed in Laertes's actions.

== Portrayal ==
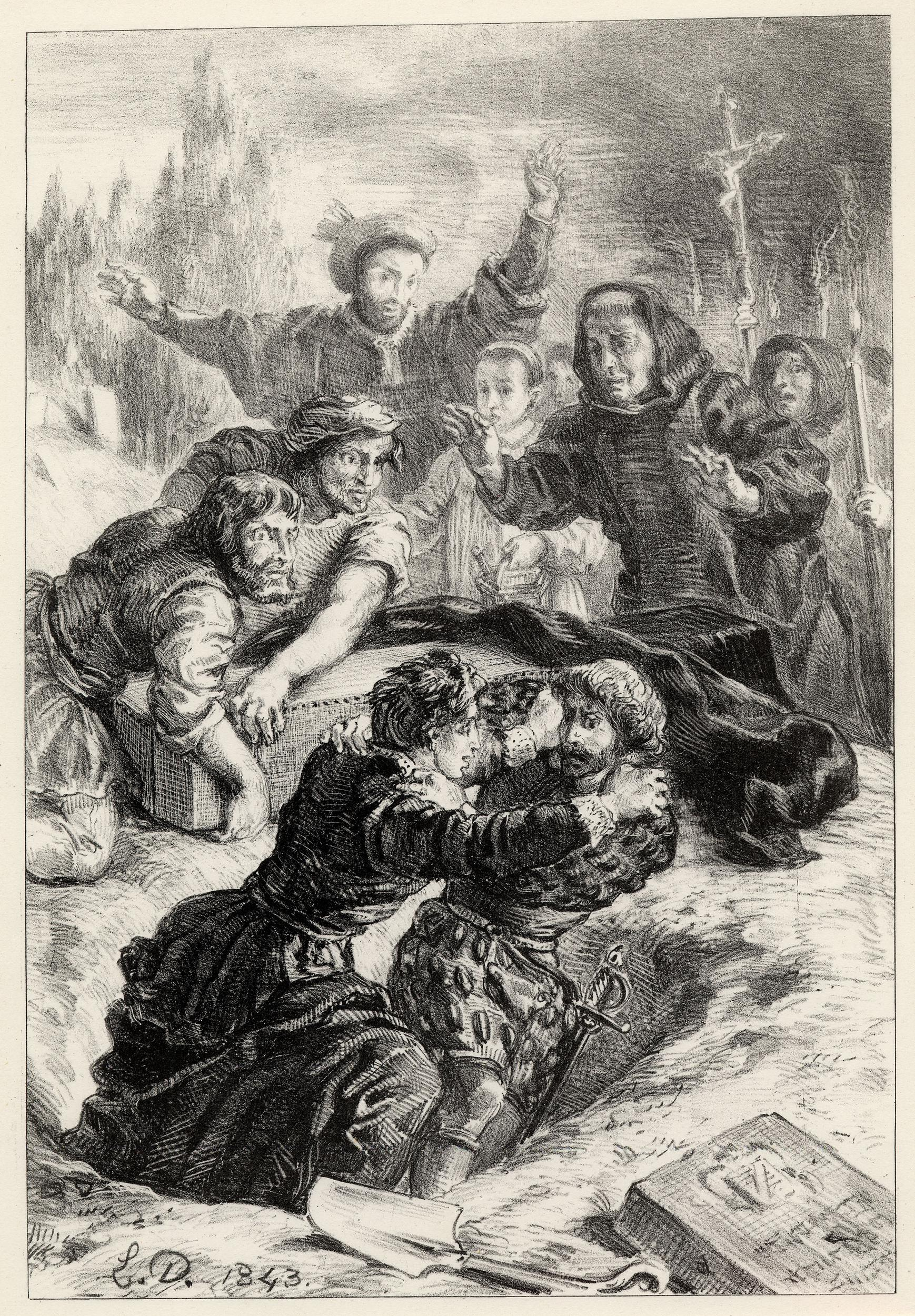
Hamlet and Laertes fight in Ophelia's grave (Eugène Delacroix, 1843)

Laertes is often portrayed by seemingly humble actors to give a loyal, wholesome appeal to the character. He has been played by Terence Morgan (1948), John Cullum (1964), Michael Pennington (1969), Nicholas Jones (1970), Nathaniel Parker (1990), Hugh Bonneville (1992), Michael Maloney (1996), Liev Schreiber (2000), Edward Bennett (2009), Kobna Holdbrook-Smith (2015), Luke Thompson (2017) and Tom Felton (2018).
