= Gertrude (Hamlet) =

Character in Shakespeare's play

- Hamlet character
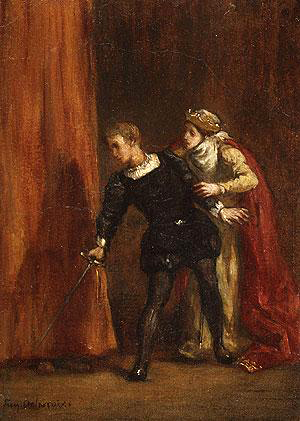
- "Hamlet and His Mother" by Eugène Delacroix
- Created by: William Shakespeare
- Based on: Gerutha (from Saxo Grammaticus' Amleth)
- Portrayed by: Boy players (Elizabethan era); Olga Knipper; Eileen Herlie; Gabrielle Colonna-Romano; Chamiyan Bai; Mercedes Brignone; Wanda Rotha; Elza Radziņa; Diane Venora; Judy Parfitt; Glenn Close; Julie Christie; Diane Venora; Gillian Barber; Sheeba Chaddha; Georgie Sterling; Diana Wynyard; Claire Bloom; Georgie Sterling; Susan Fleetwood; Penny Downie; Juliet Stevenson

In-universe information
- Title: Queen of Denmark
- Affiliation: Loyal to King Claudius
- Spouses: King Hamlet (first husband; deceased); King Claudius (brother-in-law/second husband)
- Children: Prince Hamlet (son)
- Nationality: Danish

In William Shakespeare's play Hamlet, Gertrude is Hamlet's mother and Queen of Denmark. Her relationship with Hamlet is somewhat turbulent, since he resents her marrying her husband's brother Claudius after he murdered the king (young Hamlet's father, King Hamlet). Gertrude reveals no guilt in her marriage with Claudius after the recent murder of her husband, and Hamlet begins to show signs of jealousy towards Claudius. According to Hamlet, she scarcely mourned her husband's death before marrying Claudius.

She is based on Gerutha (from Saxo Grammaticus' Amleth); her name may be influenced by Gertrude of Bavaria, who was Queen of Denmark in the late 12th century.

== Role in the play ==
Gertrude is first seen in Act 1 Scene 2 as she tries to cheer Hamlet over the loss of his father, begging him to stay at home rather than going back to school in Wittenberg. Her worry over him continues into the second act, as she sides with King Claudius in sending Rosencrantz and Guildenstern to raise the spirits of her son. Also, rather than ascribing Hamlet's sudden madness to Ophelia's rejection (as thought by Polonius), she believes the cause to be his father, King Hamlet's death and her quick, subsequent marriage to Claudius: "I doubt it is no other but the main; His father's death and our o'erhasty marriage." In Act three, she eagerly listens to the report of Rosencrantz and Guildenstern on their attempt to cheer him, and supports the King and Polonius' plan to watch Hamlet from a hidden vantage point as he speaks with Ophelia, with the hope that her presence will heal him.

In the next act, Gertrude tells Claudius of Polonius' murder, convinced that Hamlet is truly mad. She also shows genuine compassion and affection as she watches along with others as Ophelia sings and acts in absolute madness. At Ophelia's burial, she expresses her former hope that the young woman might have married her son: "I hoped thou shouldest have been my Hamlet's wife." When Hamlet appears and grapples with Laertes, she asks him to stop and for someone to hold him back—saying that he may be in a fit of madness now, but that will alleviate soon. At the beginning of the play, Gertrude lies more with her husband than her son; however, after the closet scene the whole situation is switched.

In the final scene, Gertrude notices Hamlet is tired during the fight with Laertes, and offers to wipe his brow. She drinks a cup of poison intended for Hamlet by the King, against the King's wishes, and dies, shouting in agony as she falls:

"No, no, the drink,—O my dear Hamlet—The drink, the drink! I am poison'd."

Other characters' views of the Queen are largely negative. When the Ghost of her former husband appears to Hamlet, he describes her as a "seeming virtuous queen", but orders Hamlet not to confront her about it and leave her judgement to heaven. However, his love for her while living was benevolent, as Hamlet states that his father would have held back the elements if they "visited her face too roughly".

Hamlet sees her as an example of the weakness of women (which affects his relationship with Ophelia) and constantly hurt in his reflections of how quickly (less than a month) she remarried.

== Interpretations ==
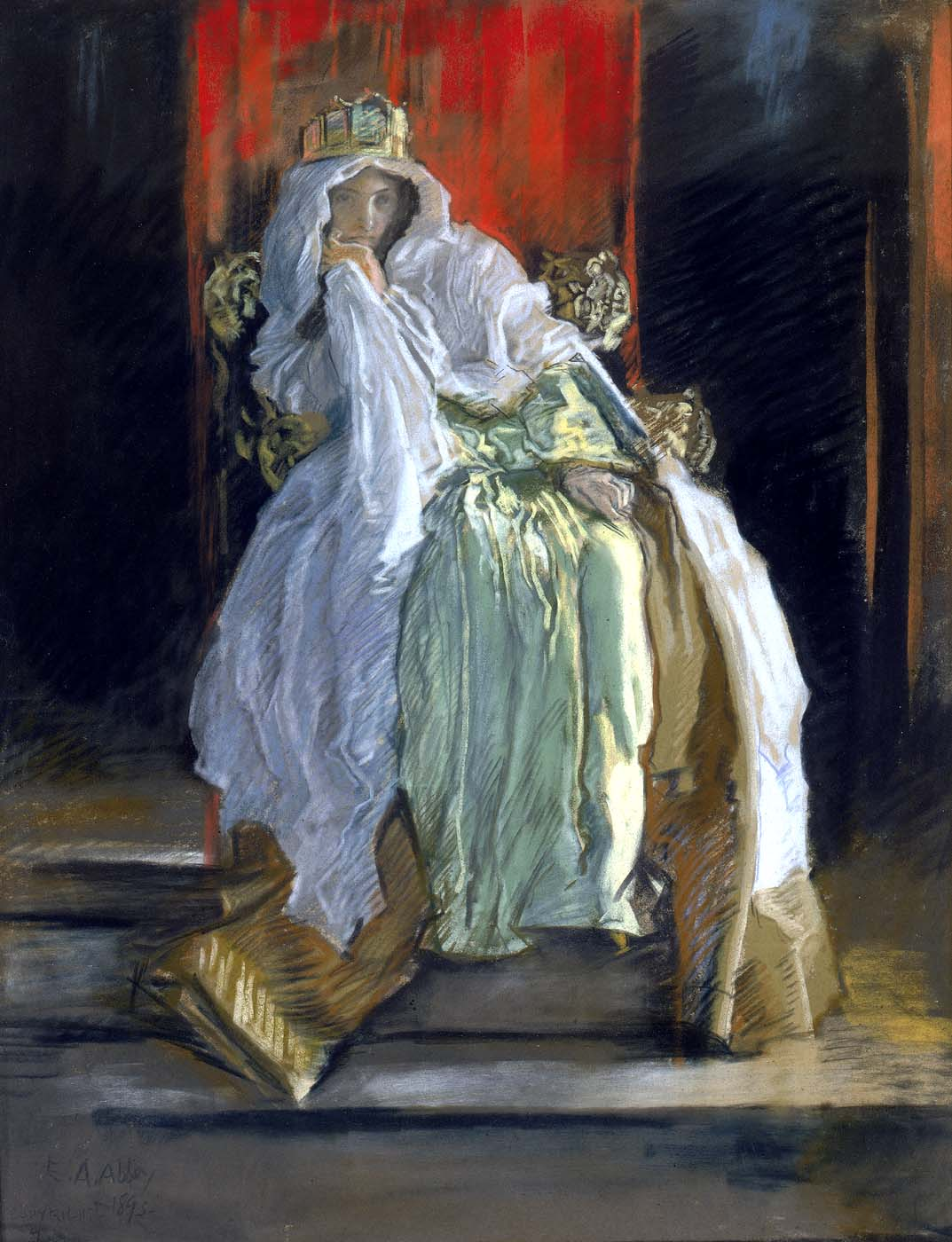
The Queen in Hamlet (Edwin Austin Abbey, 1895)

There have been numerous attempts to account for Gertrude's state of mind during the play. It could be argued that as she does not confess to any sins before she dies, she did not participate in her husband's murder. However, other considerations do point to Gertrude's complicity. After repeated erratic threats towards his mother to no response, Hamlet threatens to discover the true nature of Gertrude's character by setting up a mirror, at which point she projects a killer:

HAMLET: You go not till I set you up a glass where you may see the inmost part of you. QUEEN: What wilt thou do? Thou wilt not murder me? Help, ho!

In the 1919 essay "Hamlet and his problems" T. S. Eliot suggests that the main cause of Hamlet's internal dilemma is Gertrude's sinful behaviour. He states, "Shakespeare's Hamlet... is a play dealing with the effect of a mother's guilt upon her son."

In 1924, the social reformer Lillie Buffum Chace Wyman published a study, Gertrude of Denmark: An Interpretive Romance, an early attempt to give Gertrude's own perspective on her life and the events of the play. Wyman explicitly "interrogates the nineteenth-century cult of the self-sacrificing mother", critiquing the influence it had on interpretations of the play by both male critics and actresses playing Gertrude.

In the 1940s, Ernest Jones—a psychoanalyst and Freud's biographer—developed Freud's ideas into a series of essays that culminated in his book Hamlet and Oedipus (1949). Influenced by Jones's psychoanalytic approach, several productions have portrayed the "closet scene", where Hamlet confronts his mother in her private quarters, in a sexual light. In this reading, Hamlet is disgusted by his mother's "incestuous" relationship with Claudius while simultaneously fearful of killing him, as this would clear Hamlet's path to his mother's bed.

Carolyn Heilbrun's 1957 essay "Hamlet's Mother" defends Gertrude, arguing that the text never hints that Gertrude knew of Claudius poisoning King Hamlet. This analysis has been championed by many feminist critics. Heilbrun argued that men have for centuries completely misinterpreted Gertrude, believing what Hamlet said about her rather than the actual text of the play. By this account, no clear evidence suggests that Gertrude is an adulteress: she is merely adapting to the circumstances of her husband's death for the good of the kingdom.

== Performances ==
Women were almost exclusively banned from appearing as actresses on the stage until approximately 1660 and in the Elizabethan and Jacobean periods, troupes appeared that were composed entirely of boy players. Indeed, they are famously mentioned in Hamlet, in which a group of travelling actors has left the city due to rivalry with a troupe of "little eyases" (unfledged hawks).

Chamiyan Bai portrayed Gertrude in Sohrab Modi's Khoon Ka Khoon.

Eileen Herlie portrayed Gertrude in Laurence Olivier's Hamlet.

Glenn Close played Gertrude to Mel Gibson's Prince Hamlet in Franco Zeffirelli's Hamlet.

Julie Christie appeared as Gertrude in Kenneth Branagh's Hamlet. Despite her classical training as an actor, it was her first venture into Shakespeare.

In Michael Almereyda's modernized Hamlet, Ethan Hawke plays Hamlet as a film student, while Diane Venora plays Gertrude, wife to the former and present CEOs of "Denmark Corporation".

Blair Brown played Gertrude in a 2000 television version starring Campbell Scott as Hamlet.

In the 2009 adaptation starring David Tennant, Gertrude is portrayed by Penny Downie.

In Ryan Imhoff's Chicago production of The Hamlet Project, Gertrude is played by Angela Morris.

Tabu played Gertrude who was named Ghazala in the 2014 Bollywood adaptation of Hamlet, Haider.

In Heiner Müller's play Hamletmachine, Gertrude is referred to as "the bitch who bore" Hamlet.

Naomi Watts is Gertrude in Claire McCarthy's 2018 Ophelia.

== Influences ==
Gertrude and Claudius, a John Updike novel, serves as a prequel to the events of the play. It follows Gertrude from her wedding to King Hamlet, through an affair with Claudius, and its murderous results, until the very beginning of the play. Gertrude also appears as a character in Howard Barker's Gertrude—The Cry, which uses some of the characters from Hamlet.

Hamlet has played "a relatively small role" in the appropriation of Shakespeare's plays by women writers. Margaret Atwood's "Gertrude Talks Back", in her 1992 collection of short stories Good Bones, sees the title character setting her son straight about Old Hamlet's murder: "It wasn't Claudius, darling, it was me!"

The character of Gemma Teller Morrow on the FX show Sons of Anarchy, which incorporates plot elements from Hamlet, is influenced by and shares many traits with Queen Gertrude.
