= Polonius =

Character in Hamlet

- Hamlet character
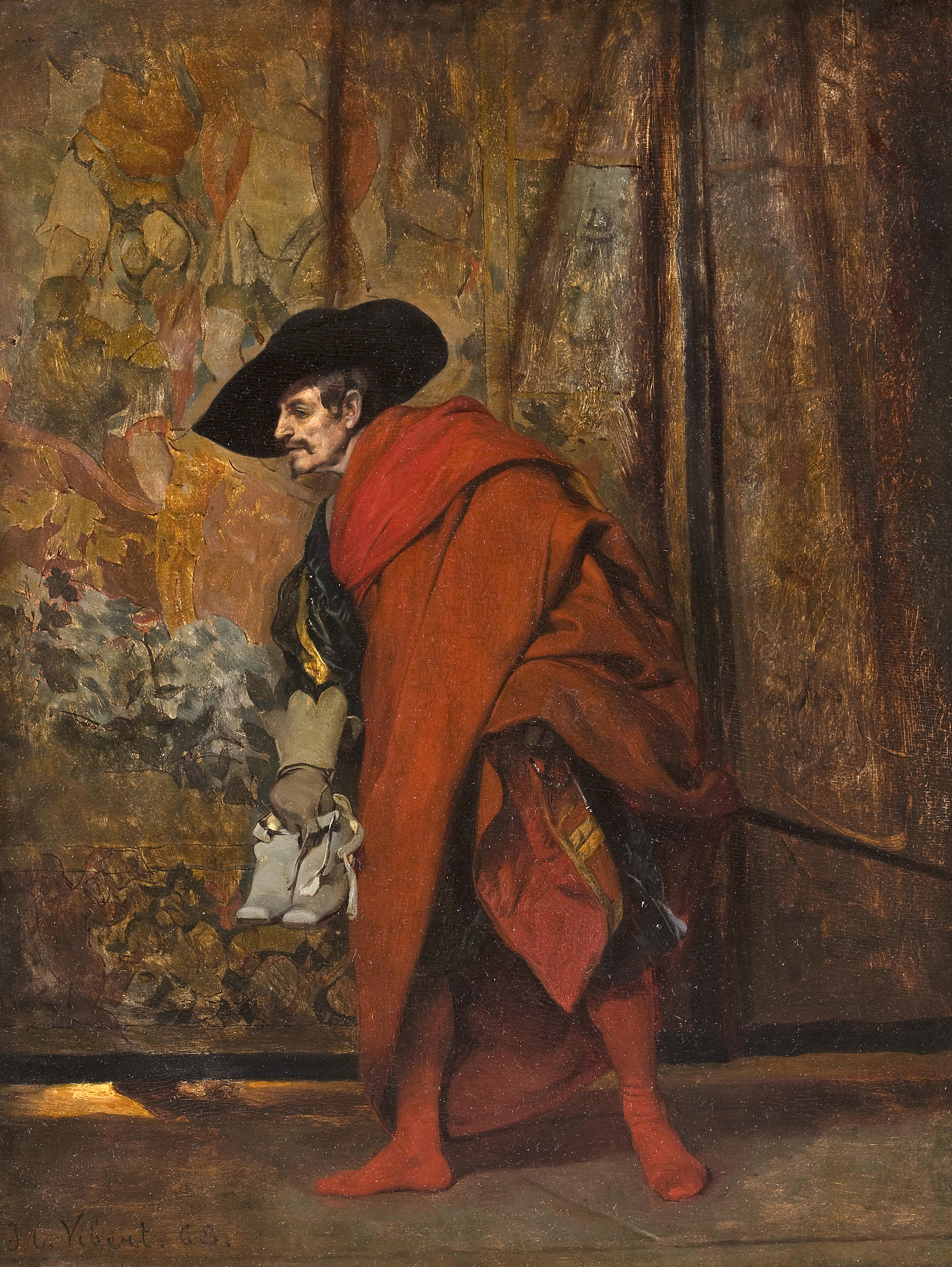
- Polonius Behind the Curtain by Jehan Georges Vibert, 1868
- Created by: William Shakespeare
- Based on: Possibly William Cecil, 1st Baron Burghley; name is an allusion to Wawrzyniec Goślicki
- Portrayed by: Hume Cronyn; Oliver Ford Davies; Hans Junkermann; Felix Aylmer; Yuri Tolubeyev; Mark Dignam; Max Cullen; Ian Holm; Richard Briers; Timothy Spall; Bill Murray; Vasily Luzhsky

In-universe information
- Alias: Corambis (First Quarto)
- Title: Lord Chamberlain
- Occupation: Courtier
- Affiliation: Loyal to King Claudius
- Spouse: Name not given
- Children: Ophelia; Laertes
- Nationality: Danish

Polonius is a character in William Shakespeare's play Hamlet. He is the chief counsellor of the play's ultimate villain King Claudius, and the father of Laertes and Ophelia. Generally regarded as wrong in every judgment he makes over the course of the play, Polonius is described by William Hazlitt as a "sincere" father, but also "a busy-body, [who] is accordingly officious, garrulous, and impertinent". In Act II, Prince Hamlet refers to Polonius as a "tedious old fool" and taunts him as a latter day "Jephtha".

Polonius connives with Claudius to spy on Hamlet. Hamlet kills Polonius in a case of mistaken identity, provoking Ophelia's descent into madness, ultimately resulting in her (probable) suicide and the climax of the play: a duel between Laertes and Hamlet.

== Character ==
Father of Ophelia and Laertes, and counsellor to King Claudius, he is described as a windbag by some and a rambler of wisdom by others. It has also been suggested that he only acts like a "foolish prating knave" to keep his position and popularity safe and to keep anyone from discovering his plots for social advancement. Throughout the play, Polonius is characterised as a typical Renaissance "new man", who pays much attention to appearances and ceremonious behaviour. Some adaptations show him conspiring with Claudius in the murder of King Hamlet.

In Act 1, Scene 3, Polonius gives advice to his son Laertes, who is leaving for France, in the form of a list of sententious maxims. He finishes by giving his son his blessing, and is apparently at ease with his son's departure. However, in Act 2, Scene 1, he orders his servant Reynaldo to travel to Paris and spy on Laertes and report if he is indulging in any local vice.

Laertes is not the only character upon whom Polonius spies. He is fearful that Hamlet's relationship with his daughter will hurt his reputation with the king and instructs Ophelia to "lock herself from [Hamlet's] resort". He later suspects that Ophelia's rejection of Hamlet's attention has caused the prince to lose his wits, and informs Gertrude and Claudius of his suspicion, claiming that his reason for commanding Ophelia to reject Hamlet was that the prince was above her station. He and the king test his hypothesis by spying on and interrogating Ophelia.

In his last attempt to spy on Hamlet, Polonius hides himself behind an arras in Gertrude's room. Hamlet deals roughly with his mother, causing her to cry for help. Polonius echoes the request for help and is heard by Hamlet, who then mistakes the voice for Claudius' and stabs through the arras and kills him.

Polonius's death at the hands of Hamlet causes Claudius to fear for his own life, Ophelia to go mad, and Laertes to seek revenge, which leads to the duel in the final act.

== Sources ==
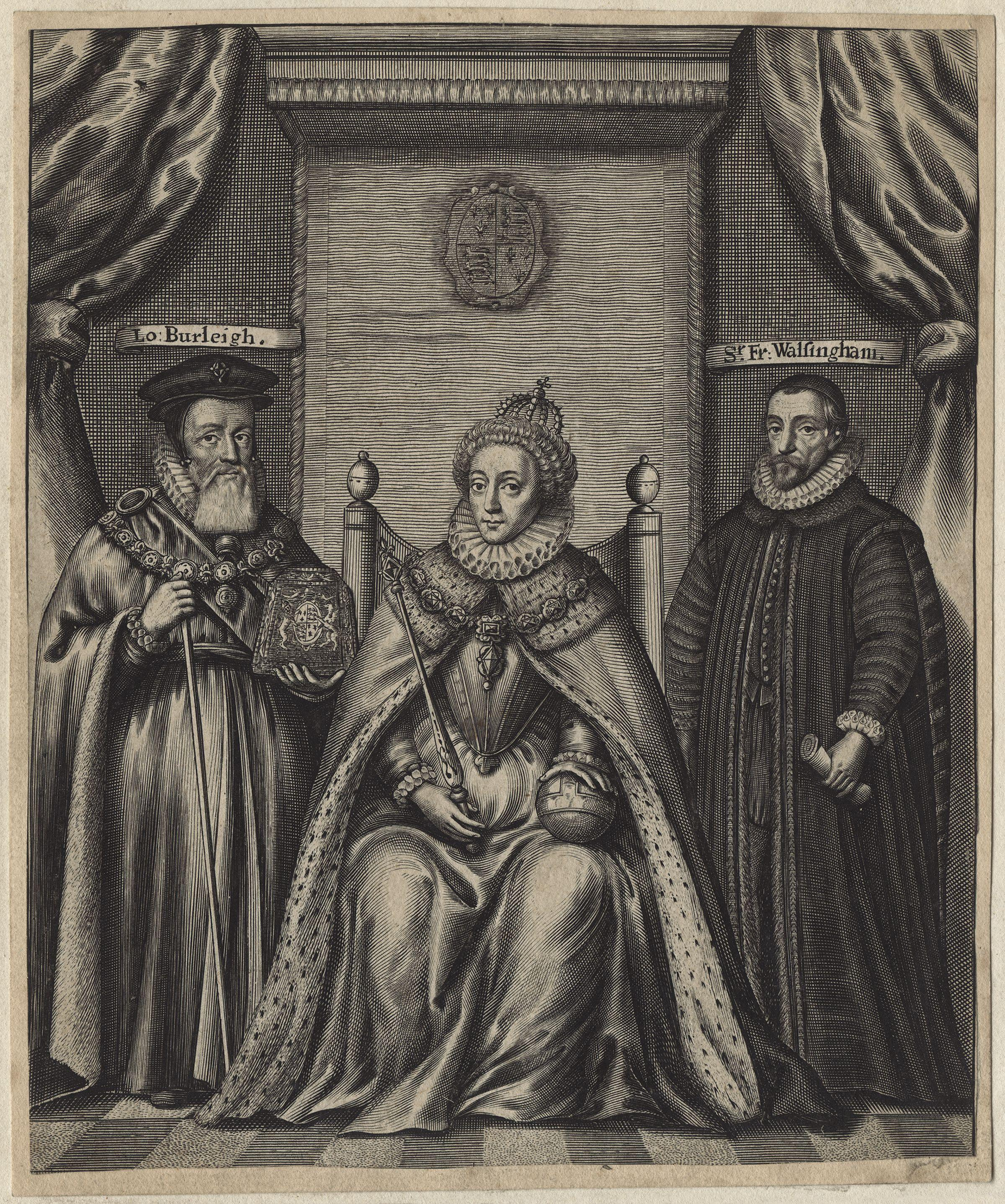
Engraving of William Cecil, 1st Baron Burghley, possible inspiration for Polonius, with Queen Elizabeth I and Sir Francis Walsingham (William Faithorne, 1655)

The literary origins of the character may be traced to the King's counsellor found in the Belleforest and William Painter versions of the Hamlet legend. However, at least since the 19th century scholars have also sought to understand the character in terms of Elizabethan court politics.

Polonius was first proposed as a parody of Queen Elizabeth's leading counsellor, Lord Treasurer, and Principal Secretary William Cecil, 1st Baron Burghley in 1869. Israel Gollancz also suggested that Polonius might have been a satire on Burghley. The theory was often finessed with supplementary arguments, but also disputed. Arden Hamlet editor Harold Jenkins, for example, criticised the idea of any direct personal satire of Burghley as "unlikely" and "uncharacteristic of Shakespeare".

== Name ==
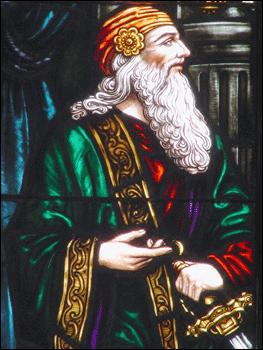
A stained glass representation of Polonius

Gollancz proposed that the source for the character's name and sententious platitudes was De optimo senatore, a book on statesmanship by the Polish courtier Wawrzyniec Grzymała Goślicki (known in Latin as Laurentius Grimaldius Goslicius), which was widely read after it was translated into English and published in 1598 under the title The Counsellor. "Polonius" is Latin for "Polish" or "Polish man." The English translation of the book refers to its author as a statesman of the "polonian empyre".

In the first quarto of Hamlet, Polonius is named "Corambis". It has been suggested that this derives from "crambe" or "crambo", derived from a Latin phrase meaning "reheated cabbage", implying "a boring old man" who spouts trite rehashed ideas. Whether this was the original name of the character or not is debated. Various suggestions have been made to explain this. G. R. Hibbard argues that the name was originally Polonius, but was changed because Q1 derives from a version of the play to be performed in Oxford and Cambridge, and the original name was too close to that of Robert Polenius (c. 1080 – c. 1146), a founder of Oxford University. Since Polonius is a parody of a pompous pseudo-intellectual, the name might have been interpreted as a deliberate insult. The title page of Q1 specifically states that the play was recently performed in London, Oxford and Cambridge.

== Stage and film portrayals ==
In most productions of the 20th century, up to about 1980, Polonius was played as a somewhat senile, garrulous man of about 75 or so, eliciting a few laughs from the audience by the depiction. More recent productions have tended to play him as a slightly younger man, and to emphasise his shiftiness rather than pompous senility, harking back to the traditional manner in which Polonius was played before the 20th century. Until the 1900s there was a tradition that the actor who plays Polonius also plays the quick-witted gravedigger in Act V. This bit suggests that the actor who played Polonius was an actor used to playing clowns much like the Fool in King Lear: not a doddering old fool, but an alive and intelligent master of illusion and misdirection. Polonius adds a new dimension to the play and is a controlling and menacing character.

One key to the portrayal is a producer's decision to keep or remove the brief scene with his servant, Reynaldo, which comes after his scene of genial, fatherly advice to Laertes. He instructs Reynaldo to spy on his son, and even suggest that he has been gambling and consorting with prostitutes, to find out what he has really been up to. The inclusion of this scene portrays him in a much more sinister light; most productions, including Laurence Olivier's 1948 film version, choose to remove it. The respective productions starring Richard Burton and Kenneth Branagh both include it. Although Hume Cronyn plays Polonius mostly for laughs in the Burton production, Richard Briers' Polonius is more sinister than comic in Branagh's version.

== Famous lines ==
Polonius's most famous lines are found in Act 1 Scene 3 ("Neither a borrower nor a lender be"; "To thine own self be true") and Act 2 Scene 2 ("Brevity is the soul of wit"; and "Though this be madness, yet there is method in't") while others have become paraphrased aphorisms ("Clothes make the man"; "Old friends are the best friends"). Also, the line he speaks when he is killed by Hamlet in Act 3 scene 4 ("Oh, I am slain!") has been subject to parody and ridicule due to its obviousness.

== Notable portrayals ==
- Hume Cronyn won a Tony Award for playing Polonius opposite Richard Burton's Hamlet in John Gielgud's 1964 Broadway production. No other actor has ever won an award for playing Polonius in any professional American stage version of Hamlet, nor for playing him in a film version of the play.
- In "The Producer", a 1966 episode of Gilligan's Island, Polonius' "Neither a borrower nor a lender be" speech is performed satirically, first by series regular Alan Hale Jr. as The Skipper playing the role of Polonius (with Dawn Wells as Mary Ann playing Laertes) in a musical production of Hamlet by the castaways, then by Phil Silvers guest-starring as a famous stage producer who finds himself on the island.
- Oliver Ford Davies played Polonius opposite David Tennant in a Royal Shakespeare Company production in 2008, a film version of which was later made and broadcast on television in December 2009.
- Actors who have played Polonius on film and television include Hans Junkermann, Ian Holm, Michael Redgrave, Ian Richardson, Bill Murray, and Richard Briers.
