= King Claudius =

Character in Hamlet

- Hamlet character
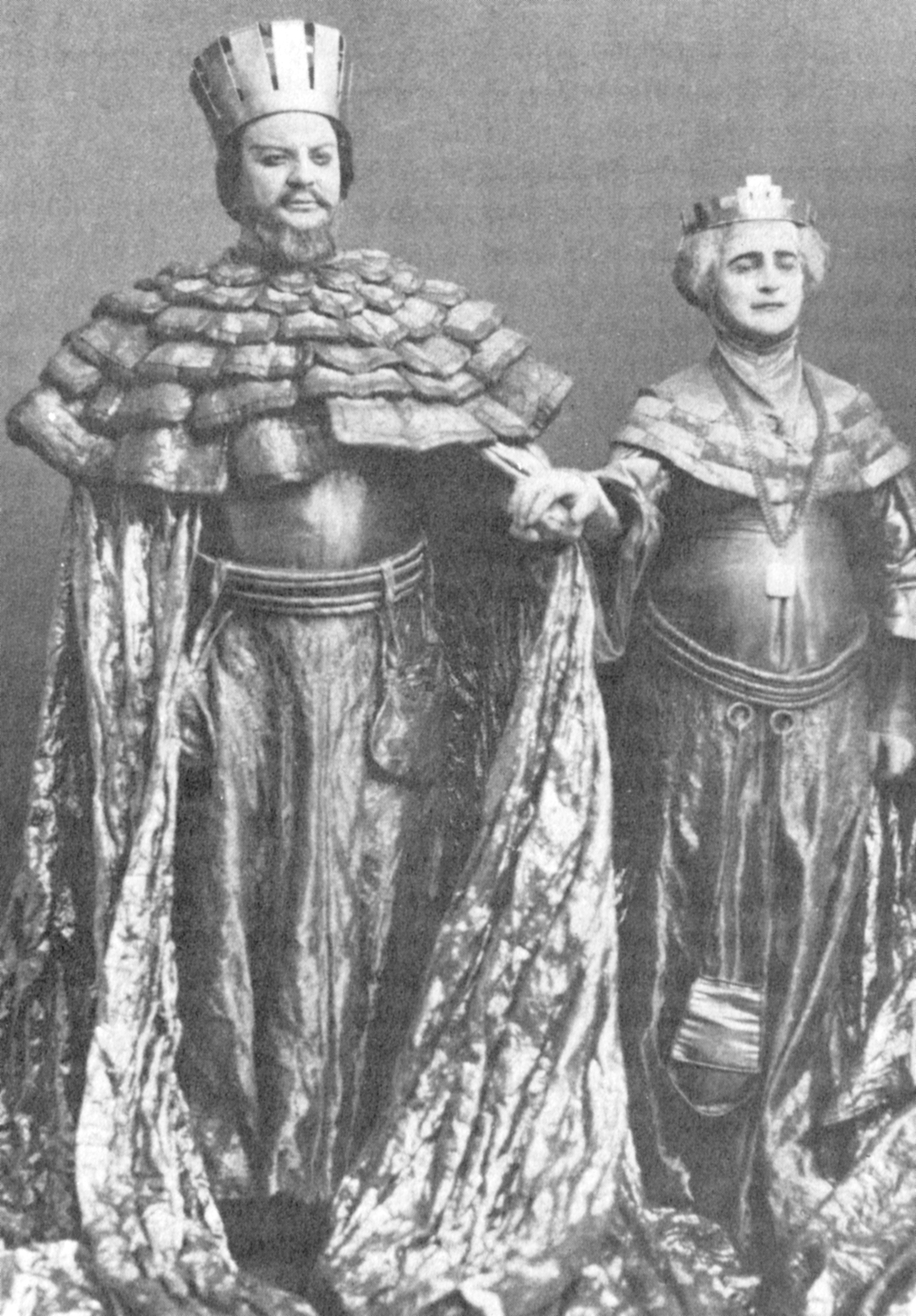
- Russian actor Nikolai Massalitinov as Claudius with Olga Knipper as Gertrude in the Moscow Art Theatre production of Hamlet (1911–1912).
- Created by: William Shakespeare
- Based on: Feng (Chronicon Lethrense and Gesta Danorum)
- Portrayed by: Eduard von Winterstein; Basil Sydney; Anthony Hopkins; Alan Bates; Derek Jacobi; Kyle MacLachlan; Patrick Stewart; Mikhail Nazvanov; Clive Owen; John Douglas Thompson

In-universe information
- Title: King of Denmark
- Family: King Hamlet (brother); Prince Hamlet (nephew/stepson)
- Spouse: Gertrude (sister-in-law/wife)
- Nationality: Danish

King Claudius is a fictional character and the main antagonist of William Shakespeare's tragedy Hamlet. He is the brother to King Hamlet, second husband to Gertrude and uncle and later stepfather to Prince Hamlet. He obtained the throne of Denmark by murdering his brother with poison and then marrying the late king's widow. He is loosely based on the Jutish chieftain Feng who appears in Chronicon Lethrense and in Saxo Grammaticus' Gesta Danorum. There has never been an actual Danish king of that name.

== Overview ==
Claudius is seen at the beginning of the play to be a capable monarch as he deals diplomatically with such issues as the military threat from Norway and Hamlet's depression. It is not until the appearance of King Hamlet's Ghost in the courtyard that the audience questions his motives. During the play's progression he takes a turn for the worse by first resorting to spying, and, when that fails, murder.

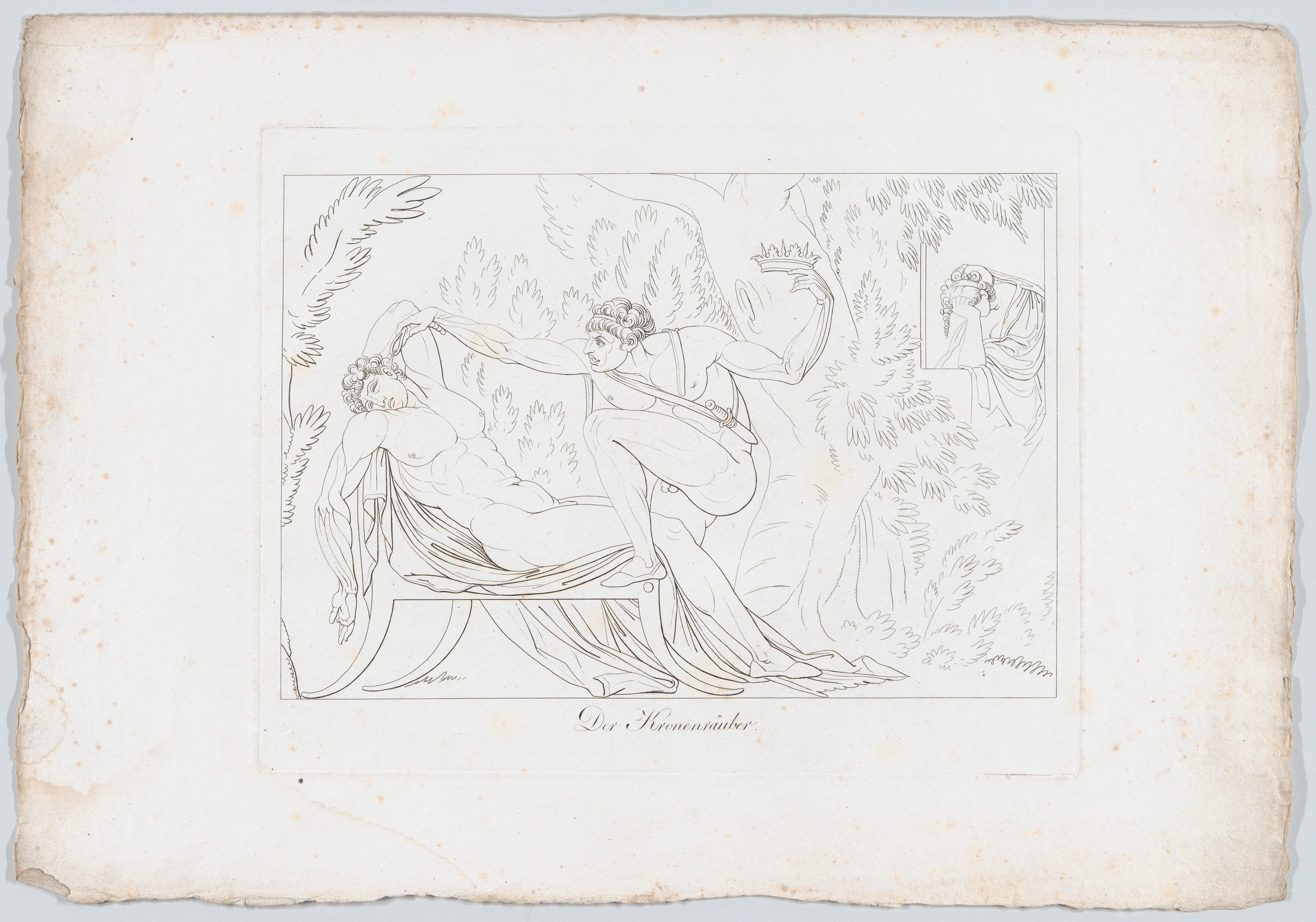
Der Kronenräuber ("The Crown Thief": Claudio [sic] Murders His Brother, King Hamlet, By Pouring Poison into His Ear as He Lies Sleeping in the Garden) (Johann Heinrich Lips and Henry Fuseli, 1806)

It is in Act III Scene 3, when Claudius forestalls Hamlet's revenge by confessing his sins to God in his own private chapel, that the audience can be sure of his guilt. He is shown to be discontent and unhappy with the events taking place. The young prince spies him brooding about his wrongdoings and trying to pray for forgiveness, but he knows all too well that prayer alone will not save him if he continues to benefit from his own sin. If he were to truly repent, he would have to confess his sin and give up all he achieved through it, which he chooses not to do. Despite his remorse, the king still seeks Hamlet's death in an effort to save both his throne and his life, as he believes the prince is now aware of his part in King Hamlet's death. Hamlet is ready to kill him, only to back down, feeling that to kill the king in such a way would contradict the revenge conditions given to him by his father, who commanded him specifically: "Taint not thy mind."

When Laertes seeks revenge for his father Polonius' death at Hamlet's hands, Claudius finally concocts a 'surefire' plan to deal with Hamlet once and for all. He arranges a fencing match between Hamlet and Laertes, but plots with Laertes to poison his foil and give Hamlet a poisoned drink. The king's plan fails; Queen Gertrude drinks from the poisoned chalice instead of Hamlet and dies, and Hamlet, after being struck by the poisoned foil, captures the same sword and strikes Laertes, who then finally reveals Claudius' plot. As Norway's army, led by young Prince Fortinbras, surrounds the castle, Hamlet finally exacts his revenge and slays Claudius by stabbing him with the sword and then forcing him to drink the poison that he had intended for Hamlet.

== Interpretation ==
The character Claudius is both the major antagonist of the piece and a complex individual. He is the villain of the piece, as he admits to himself: "O, my offence is rank it smells to heaven" (Act III, Scene 3, Line 40), yet his remarkable self-awareness and remorse complicates Claudius's villain status, much like Macbeth. (Abraham Lincoln held that the "...my offence is rank..." monologue by Claudius was superior to the "To be, or not to be" monologue by Hamlet.) Claudius's fratricide is the corruption permeating the play's world – that which is, in the words of Marcellus (a guard), "something … rotten in the state of Denmark." Shakespeare reminds the audience of the crime several times by having characters mention the story of Cain and Abel, including Claudius himself, who admits being inflicted with "the primal eldest curse." Claudius's cruelty is reflected in his schemes to kill Hamlet – sending him to England to be killed, as well as setting up a rigged fencing match. Claudius is also a heavy drinker, proposing numerous toasts and presiding over a rowdy court; he appropriately succumbs to his own poisoned wine.

The king is not without redeeming virtues, though. He is seen to be an able monarch (notwithstanding the unfavourable comparison to his murdered predecessor in Hamlet's first soliloquy) as well as a quick thinker and smooth talker, who in Act IV, Scene 5 converts Laertes from rebel to accomplice. In Act III, Scene 1 he fleetingly shows remorse for his crimes, and in Scene 3 he attempts to pray, even as he realises that he cannot sincerely repent ("Words without thoughts never to heaven go"), and eventually continues in his evil ways. Most commentators agree that the king's evil nature is evident, and that the other aspects of his nature exemplify Shakespeare's ability to portray his villains as fully human.

The king is named after the Roman emperor Claudius, who was considered the archetype of an evil ruler in Shakespeare's time. The historical Claudius's incestuous marriage to and alleged poisoning by Agrippina the Younger, who was later herself murdered by her son Nero, are mirrored in the play, as Hamlet himself appears to note in Act III, Scene 2: "Soft! now to my mother. / O heart, lose not thy nature; let not ever / The soul of Nero enter this firm bosom ...."

Although the character is referred to as "Claudius, King of Denmark" in stage directions, the name "Claudius" is never actually spoken in the play.

== Portrayals ==
Eduard von Winterstein portrayed Claudius in the 1921 German silent film adaptation of Hamlet.

Basil Sydney played Claudius in Laurence Olivier's 1948 film adaptation of Hamlet.

Mikhail Nazvanov portrayed Claudius in the Soviet 1964 film adaptation of Hamlet.

Anthony Hopkins portrayed Claudius as a young, virile king in Tony Richardson's 1969 film, starring Nicol Williamson in the title role.

Alan Bates played Claudius as a drunken, buffoonish, craven schemer in Franco Zeffirelli's 1990 film.

In Kenneth Branagh's 1996 film, Claudius was played by Derek Jacobi. Jacobi had not only been Branagh's mentor as an actor, but had previously played Hamlet himself with Patrick Stewart as Claudius in a BBC production.

In Michael Almereyda's 2000 film, Claudius was played by Kyle MacLachlan.

Patrick Stewart once again portrayed Claudius with the Royal Shakespeare Company in 2008, in a production directed by Gregory Doran.

In Vishal Bhardwaj's adaptation Haider (2014), the character was portrayed by actor Kay Kay Menon.

Clive Owen portrayed Claudius in Claire McCarthy's 2018 film Ophelia.

John Douglas Thompson portrayed Claudius in 2023 at the Delacorte Theatre with Shakespeare in the Park.

== Characters modelled on Claudius ==
Claudius also inspired the character Miraz in C. S. Lewis' novel Prince Caspian, part of The Chronicles of Narnia series.

Ron Perlman portrayed Clay Morrow in the television series Sons of Anarchy, which relies heavily on the general plot structure of Hamlet; his character is based on Claudius. Ron Perlman has said, "I'm sure they're going to stick to the structure of Hamlet all the way to the end" of the series.

In Disney's The Lion King, the villain, Scar (voiced by Jeremy Irons), brother of King Mufasa, was modelled after Claudius; both characters murder their brothers and dissemble to their nephews to ascend to the throne.
