= Ghost (Hamlet) =

Character in Shakespeare's Hamlet

- Hamlet character
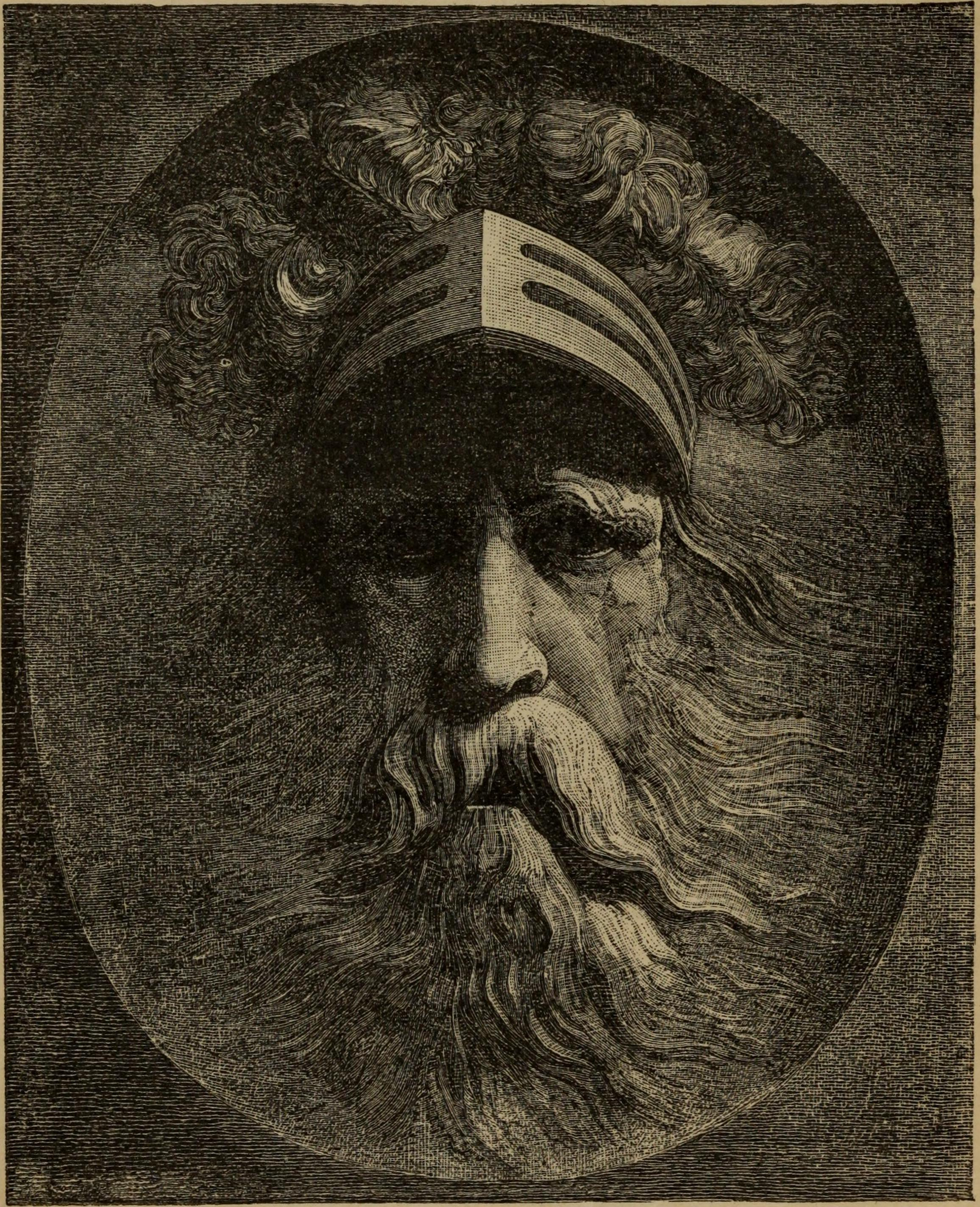
- Illustration of the Ghost by Thomas Ridgeway Gould from an 1890 printing of Hamlet
- Created by: William Shakespeare
- Based on: Horwendill (Chronicon Lethrense and Gesta Danorum)
- Portrayed by: William Shakespeare (possibly); Laurence Olivier; Paul Scofield; Patrick Stewart; Brian Blessed; Irrfan Khan

In-universe information
- Alias: King Hamlet
- Title: King of Denmark
- Family: King Claudius (brother)
- Spouse: Gertrude (wife)
- Children: Prince Hamlet (son)
- Nationality: Danish

The ghost of Hamlet's father is a character from William Shakespeare's play Hamlet. In the stage directions, he is referred to as "Ghost". His name is also Hamlet, and he is referred to as King Hamlet to distinguish him from the Prince, his son and the protagonist of the story.

== In Hamlet ==
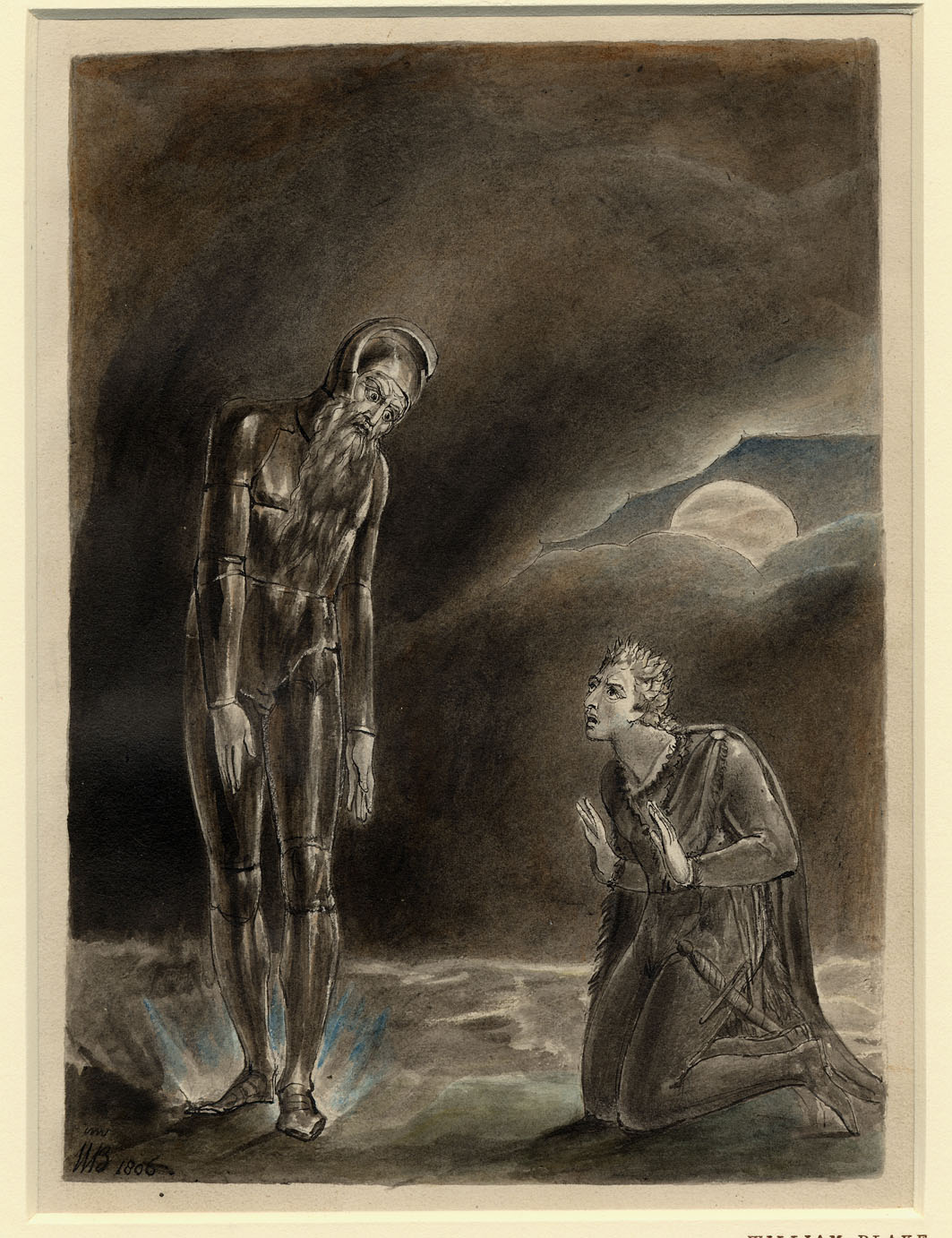
Hamlet and his Father's Ghost (William Blake, 1806)

The Ghost appears four times throughout the play: in Act I, Scene i; in the continuum of Act I, Scenes iv and v; and in Act III, Scene iv. The Ghost arrives shortly after midnight in at least two of the scenes, and in the other scenes, all that is known is that it is night.

The Ghost first appears to two soldiers—Bernardo and Marcellus—and Hamlet's friend, Horatio. The men draw their swords and stand in fear, requesting that Horatio, as a scholar, address the Ghost. Horatio asks the Ghost to speak, and reveal its secret. It is about to do so when the cock crows, signalling morning, and the Ghost instead disappears. In this scene, the Ghost is clearly recognised by all present as the King, dressed in his full armour. Marcellus notes that the Ghost had appeared to the castle guards twice before. Talk of spectral visitations has unsettled the night watch. Francisco, whom Bernardo relieves on guard duty says, "For this relief much thanks; 'tis bitter cold,/And I am sick at heart."

Seeing the Ghost arrayed in a military aspect, and aware that the Norwegian crown prince Fortinbras is marshalling his forces on the frontier, Horatio recognises that the appearance of the Ghost must portend something regarding matters of state.

Horatio then persuades Prince Hamlet into staying up with the guards to see if the Ghost returns. At midnight, the Ghost appears, and beckons Hamlet to follow. Once alone, the Ghost describes his wanderings on the earth, and his harrowing life in Purgatory, since he died without receiving last rites.

"...but know, thou noble youth,
The serpent that did sting thy Fathers life,
Now wears his crown."

— Ghost of Hamlet's Father

He tells the young Hamlet that he was poisoned and murdered by his brother, Claudius, the new King of Denmark, and asks the prince to avenge his death. He also expresses disgust at his wife, Gertrude, for marrying Claudius, but warns Hamlet not to confront her, but to leave that to Heaven. Later, Prince Hamlet returns to his friends and has them swear on his sword to keep what they have seen a secret. When they resist, the Ghost utters the words "Swear" and "Swear on the sword", from below the stage, until his friends agree.

Prince Hamlet, fearing that the apparition may be a demon pretending to be King Hamlet, decides to put the Ghost to the test by staging a play that re-enacts the circumstances that the spirit claims led to his death. Claudius' reaction is one of guilt and horror, and Prince Hamlet is convinced that the Ghost is, in fact, his father.

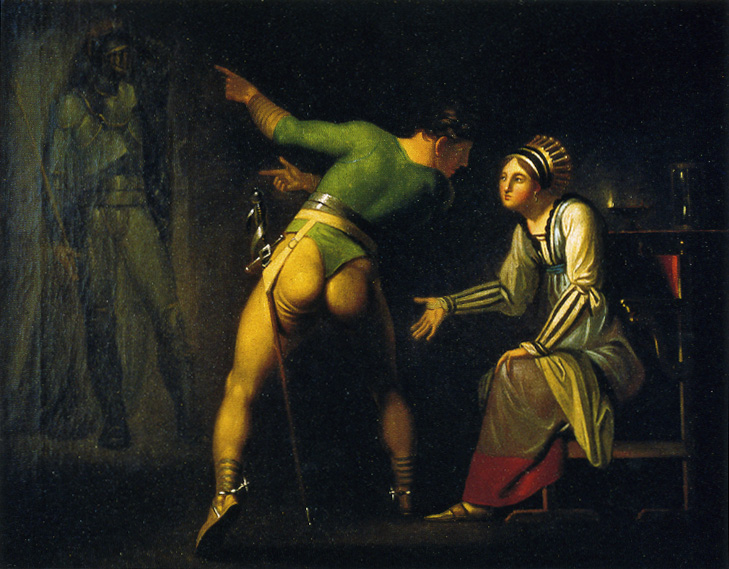
Hamlet attempts to show his mother the ghost of his father (Nicolai Abildgaard, c. 1778)

In the third appearance, Hamlet is confronted by the Ghost in his mother's closet, and is rebuked for not carrying out his revenge and for disobeying his instruction by talking to Gertrude. Hamlet fearfully apologises. Gertrude, however, cannot see the Ghost, and thinks Hamlet is mad, asking why he stares and talks to nothing. In this scene, the Ghost is described as being in his nightgown. He is never mentioned again.

King Hamlet is described by the few characters who mention him—basically Hamlet, Horatio and the guards—as a warrior, as he led Denmark's forces to victory against Norway, and personally defeated its King Fortinbras in hand-to-hand combat. Hamlet respects him, saying Claudius pales in comparison to him, and frequently reflecting on him in an endearing manner.

== Sources ==
The Ghost is loosely based on a legendary Jutish chieftain named Horwendill, who appears in Chronicon Lethrense and in Saxo Grammaticus' Gesta Danorum. According to oral tradition, the Ghost was originally played on stage by Shakespeare himself.

== Interpretations ==
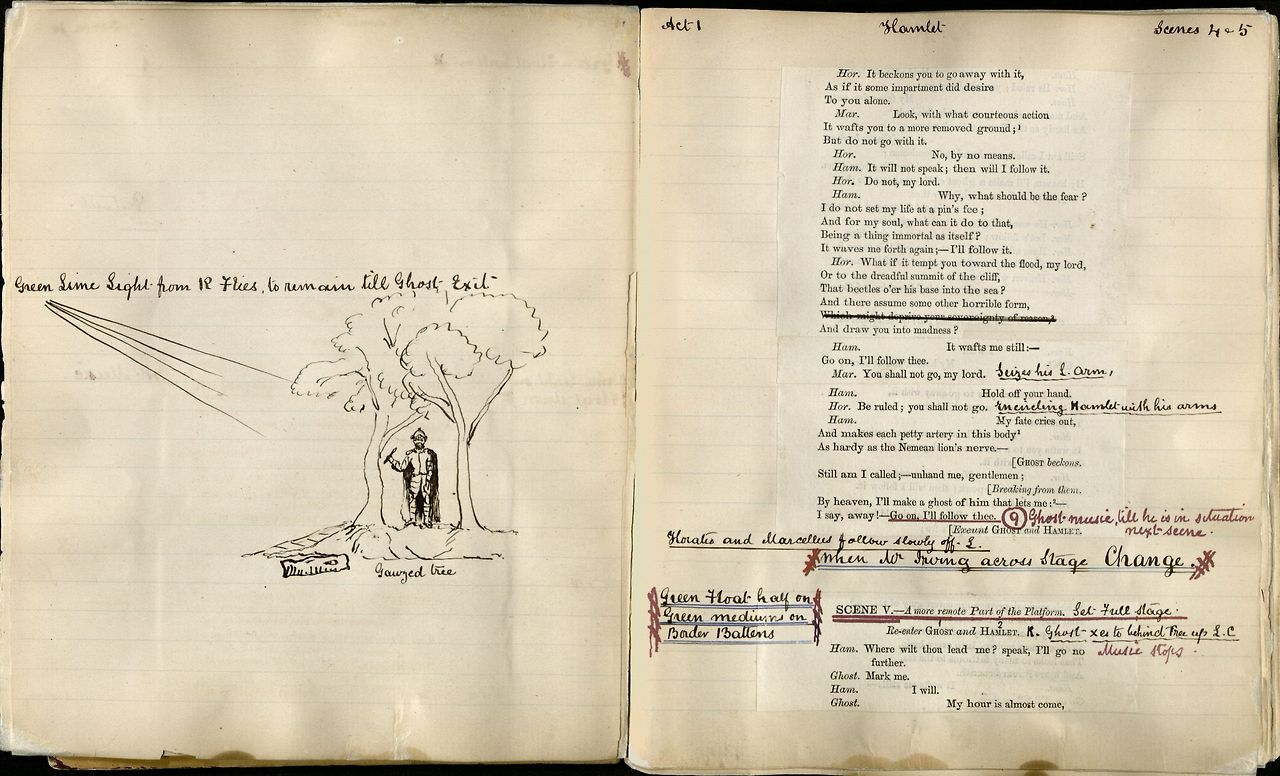
The prompt book from an 1874 staging of Hamlet by English actor and manager Henry Irving (1838–1905), in which he experimented with using limelight (burning calcium oxide) to represent the Ghost.

The Ghost in Hamlet is fundamental to the plot and has been the subject of a variety of interpretations. Shakespeare scholar W. W. Greg was of the opinion that the Ghost was a figment of Hamlet's overwrought imagination. Shakespeare scholar J. Dover Wilson and others have argued that in having the Ghost appear a number of times to others before appearing to Hamlet, Shakespeare makes clear that the apparition is not a mere illusion.

Some scholars have focused on Shakespeare's religious views in determining whether he intended the Ghost as the genuine spirit of Hamlet's father or a demon sent to torment him. They have suggested that if Shakespeare was a Catholic, the Ghost would be legitimate as a denizen of Purgatory; if Shakespeare was an Anglican (as the majority of his target audience was), the Ghost would be a demon, as Anglicanism has no equivalent doctrine relating to the cleansing of deceased souls. Others have argued that ghost stories were a staple of Elizabethan folklore and Shakespeare did not take any religion's teachings about the afterlife into account when writing Hamlet. Robert H. West cited the Ghost's concern for Gertrude as evidence of his authenticity.

== Performances ==
About a hundred years after Shakespeare died, the poet Nicholas Rowe reported that he had heard an anecdote that Shakespeare himself had played the Ghost, starting a story that is still given credence today. Modern actors who have portrayed the Ghost include Laurence Olivier, Paul Scofield, Patrick Stewart, Brian Blessed and Irrfan Khan.

== See also ==
- Ghosts in the arts
- Ghost story
