= Matthew Stillman =

British entrepreneur (born 1967)

- Born: 28 September 1967 (age 58); London, England
- Education: University College School, London; Sussex University (UK)
- Occupations: Entrepreneur and film producer
- Spouse: Kate Driver

Matthew Stillman (born September 28, 1967) is a British entrepreneur, CEO and founder of 2020 Group (also known as 2020 Content) and film producer . The group owns 30 companies in 16 countries, operating under 10 brands.

Companies have co-produced films including Nosferatu, Spider-Man, Extraction 2, The Gray Man, Casino Royale, Mission: Impossible - Ghost Protocol, Chronicles of Narnia and The Bourne Identity; series such as Wheel of Time, Interview with the Vampire, Dune: The Prophecy, Tangled and Wednesday; music videos for Beyonce, Megan Thee Stallion, Lizzo, Thom Yorke, Kanye West, David Bowie and Madonna; and commercials for clients including Adidas, Google, Guinness, Coca-Cola, Amazon, Apple and Audi.

Wednesday, produced by the Stillking Icon team in Romania, became the most-watched Netflix series in its first week and went on to win four Primetime Emmys and Poor Things, produced in Budapest by Pioneer Stillking, won four Oscars, two Golden Globes, and five BAFTAs, among other awards.

Current productions include the upcoming films Dune: Part Three, Warner Bros (Denis Villeneuve; Timothée Chalamet, Zendaya, Anya Taylor-Joy), What Happens at Night, Apple (Martin Scorsese; Leonardo DiCaprio, Jennifer Lawrence, Mads Mikkelsen), The Hunger Games: Sunrise on the Reaping, Lionsgate (Francis Lawrence; Elle Fanning, Ralph Fiennes, Kieran Culkin), The Age of Innocence, Netflix (Shannon Murphy; Camila Morrone, Kristine Froseth, Ben Radcliffe), Resident Evil, Sony Pictures (Zach Cregger; Austin Abrams, Zach Cherry, Kali Reis), Sunny Dancer, Athenaeum Productions (George Jaques; James Norton, Bella Ramsey, Neil Patrick Harris) and Billion Dollar Spy, Walden Media (Amma Asante; Russell Crowe, Harry Lawtey, Rufus Sewell).

In 2000, The Hollywood Reporter named Stillman in its International Power 50 list of the fifty "biggest power players" in global entertainment and media.

== Early life and education ==
Stillman grew up in Richmond, south-west London. His father imported products from China, while his mother worked for Air France at Heathrow Airport. He has two siblings. He was educated at University College School, and the University of Sussex, where he studied politics, graduating in 1991.

== Career ==
=== Early career ===
After unsuccessfully trying to break into the film industry in London, Stillman visited Prague in 1992 with a friend, Nick Spikings, to explore the possibility of setting up a production company in the city. Beginning with "$500 and a typewriter" and renting an office at Barrandov Studios for $150 a month, the two friends set up a company called Stillking. They then started a nightclub, Ubiquity, to provide cash flow over the company's first summer.

=== Stillking ===
Stillman won Stillking's first business working on a music video for k.d. lang, then produced a TV commercial for Dentsu. More work on TV commercials followed. In 1994, Stillman chose an unknown Czech film student, Ivan Zachariáš, to make a film about UN peacekeepers for a 50th-anniversary commercial for the UN. The project marked a breakthrough for both Stillking and Zachariáš.

By 1995, Stillking was working on around ninety commercials a year. Film-makers were coming to Prague in large numbers, attracted by the combination of low costs, attractive locations and high production standards, and over the next decade the company thrived and expanded. Offices were in due course opened in Budapest (Pioneer Stillking), Bucharest (Icon Stillking), Belgrade (Stillking WIP), Malaga (Anima Stillking), Cape Town, Ljubljana and Mexico City. By 1999 the company was turning over around $20m a year and by 2002 about $168m.

In 1995, Stillking made its first network mini-series: The Ring, for NBC, starring Nastassja Kinski, was released in 1996. The same year Stillking worked on its first feature film, Plunkett & Macleane (released 1999) with Working Title Films. Stillking subsequently set up its own development arm for producing its own English-language films.

The company has become one of Europe's most significant production entities, participating in over 150 film and TV projects, including Maria, Poor Things, Casino Royale, The Bourne Identity, Van Helsing, Red Sparrow, Wanted, Interview with the Vampire, Wednesday, Carnival Row and The Witcher.

It has also continued to produce music videos, including work for Beyonce, Kanye West and Madonna; and commercials for clients such as Guinness, Audi, Coca-Cola, Mercedes, Apple and Stella Artois.

In 1997, the American heiress Elisabeth Goth purchased a minority stake in the company (reportedly 20 per cent) for an undisclosed sum.

=== Stink ===
In 1997, Stillking combined with the production company Blink Ltd to create Stink, a London-based venture that produces TV commercials. Stink went on to receive numerous awards for its work, including more than 100 Cannes Lions, more than 50 D&AD pencils and the first ever Film Grand Prix for an interactive piece of work. Its clients have included Honda, Gucci, Apple, Nike and Facebook.

=== 2020 Group ===
In 2014 the Stillking Films holding company was renamed 2020 Group. The group, which is sometimes referred to as 2020 Content, now has over 30 daughter companies, in 16 countries, and is one of the largest private companies involved in the production of content in advertising, film and television. Stillman is founder and CEO.

=== On The Corner Films / Box To Box Films ===
In 2017 Stillman became an investor and director of On The Corner Films, with Asif Karpadia and James Gay Rees and Box To Box Films. The companies specialize in documentaries and factual entertainment, and their award-winning productions include Diego Maradona (2019), Drive To Survive, Full Swing, Break Point, Six Nations, Surfing and Tour de France.

In 2024, On The Corner Films and Box To Box Films received a minority investment from Bruin Capital, an investment company focused on global sports, media and technology.

=== Illuminated Content ===
In 2018, in collaboration with Liev Schreiber, Stillman launched Illuminated Content, a Gotham-based venture to develop, produce and finance TV and movie projects. In 2019 the company produced Human Capital, and announced a collaboration with David Carver to produce The Place I Belong, a biopic of the golfer Moe Norman and the documentary Meeting Zelenskyy in 2024.

== Other activities ==
Stillman is a member of the British Academy of Film and Television Arts (Bafta). He is a member of Founders Forum, the community for global entrepreneurs, CEOs, and investors in the digital, media and technology sectors.

Stillman was one of 1,280 British business leaders who signed a letter backing Britain Stronger In Europe on the eve of the UK's 2016 referendum on EU membership.

== Filmography (selected) ==
Works for cinema involving Stillman's companies
Year	Title	Company
2026	Dune: Part Three	Pioneer Stillking, Budapest
2026	The Hunger Games: Sunrise on the Reaping	Ánima Stillking, Spain
2026	Resident Evil	Stillking Prague
2026	Pretty Lethal	Pioneer Stillking, Budapest
2024	Nosferatu	Stillking Prague
2024	Maria	Pioneer Stillking, Budapest
2024	Better Man	Stillking WIP, Belgrade
2024	Lee	Pioneer Stillking, Budapest
2024	White Bird: A Wonder Story	Stillking Prague
2024	The Union	Stillking WIP, Belgrade
2024	First Omen	Stillking WIP, Belgrade
2024	Spaceman	Stillking Prague
2024	Tarot	Stillking WIP, Belgrade
2023	Poor Things	Pioneer Stillking, Budapest
2023	Fair Play	Stillking WIP, Belgrade
2023	Extraction 2	Stillking Prague
2022	Glass Onion: A Knives Out Mystery	Stillking WIP, Belgrade
2022	Hellraiser	Stillking WIP, Belgrade
2022	The Gray Man	Stillking Prague
2022	Chevalier	Stillking Prague
2020	Radioactive	Pioneer Stillking, Budapest
2020	Harry Haft	Pioneer Stillking, Budapest
2020	Voyagers	Icon Stillking, Bucharest
2020	Violence of Action	Icon Stillking, Bucharest
2019	Human Capital	Illuminated Content, New York
2019	Spider-Man: Far From Home	Stillking Prague
2019	Diego Maradona	On The Corner Films, London
2019	The King	Pioneer Stillking, Budapest
2018	Ophelia	Stillking Prague
2018	Red Sparrow	Pioneer Stillking, Budapest
2018	Colette	Pioneer Stillking, Budapest
2017	Interlude in Prague	Stillking Prague
2017	Atomic Blonde	Pioneer Stillking, Budapest
2016	Underworld: Blood Wars	Stillking Prague
2016	Don't Breathe	Pioneer Stillking, Budapest
2015	Child 44	Stillking Prague
2013	Snowpiercer	Stillking Prague
2011	Mission: Impossible - Ghost Protocol	Stillking Prague
2009	G.I. Joe: The Rise of Cobra	Stillking Prague
2008	Wanted	Stillking Prague
2008	Quantum of Solace	Stillking Santiago de Chile
2008	The Chronicles of Narnia: Prince Caspian	Stillking Prague
2006	Casino Royale	Stillking Prague
2006	The Illusionist	Stillking Prague
2006	Last Holiday	Stillking Prague
2006	Tristan + Isolde	Stillking Prague
2005	The Chronicles of Narnia: The Lion, the Witch and the Wardrobe	Stillking Prague
2005	Doom	Stillking Prague
2005	Kinky Boots	Stillking Miro, Milan
2005	Everything Is Illuminated	Stillking Prague
2004	AVP: Alien vs. Predator	Stillking Prague
2004	Van Helsing	Stillking Prague
2004	The Prince and Me	Stillking Prague
2004	EuroTrip	Stillking Prague
2003	Shanghai Knights	Stillking Prague
2002	xXx	Stillking Prague
2002	The Bourne Identity	Stillking Prague
2002	Bad Company	Stillking Prague
2001	From Hell	Stillking Prague
2000	Mists of Avalon	Stillking Prague
2000	Dungeons & Dragons	Stillking Prague
1999	The Idiot Returns	Stillking Prague
1999	Plunkett & Macleane	Stillking Prague

Works for television involving Stillman's companies
Year	Title	Type	Company
2026	The Age of Innocence	TV mini-series	Stillking Prague
2026	Ride or Die	TV mini-series	Stillking Prague
2026	The Rookie	TV series (1 episode)	Stillking Prague
2025	The Girlfriend	TV mini-series	Ánima Stillking, Spain
2025	The Twisted Tale of Amanda Knox	TV mini-series	Pioneer Stillking, Budapest
2025	Daryl Dixon	TV series (S3–4)	Ánima Stillking, Spain
2025	Death by Lightning	TV mini-series	Pioneer Stillking, Budapest
2025	Fubar	TV series (1 episode)	Stillking Prague
2025	Band of Spies	TV mini-series	Pioneer Stillking, Budapest
2024	Interview with the Vampire	TV series (S2)	Stillking Prague
2024	We Were The Lucky Ones	TV mini-series	Icon Stillking, Bucharest
2024	Dune: The Prophecy	TV series	Pioneer Stillking, Budapest
2024	Shardlake	TV series	Pioneer Stillking, Budapest
2023	All The Light We Cannot See	TV mini-series	Pioneer Stillking Budapest
2023	The Continental	TV mini-series	Pioneer Stillking, Budapest
2023	A Small Light	TV mini-series	Stillking Prague
2022	Wednesday	TV series	Icon Stillking, Bucharest
2024-2025	Wheel of Time	TV series (S3)	Stillking Prague
2021-2024	FBI International	TV series (S1-4)	Pioneer Stillking, Budapest
2021	Hunters	TV series (S2)	Stillking Prague
2018-2023	Das Boot	TV series (S1-4)	Stillking Prague
2019	Miracle Workers	TV series – involved in 1 episode	Stillking Prague
2019	The Witcher	TV series	Stillking Prague
2019	Whiskey Cavalier	TV series - 13 episodes	Stillking Prague
2019	Carnival Row	TV series - 6 episodes	Stillking Prague
2019	Treadstone	TV series	Pioneer Stillking, Budapest
2018	Das Boot	TV series - 9 episodes	Stillking Prague
2018	The Romanoffs	TV series - 1 episode	Icon Stillking, Bucharest
2017-2019	Knightfall	TV series - 15 episodes	Stillking Prague
2017	Genius	TV series - 10 episodes	Stillking Prague
2016-2017	Mars	TV series - 4 episodes	Pioneer Stillking, Budapest
2016-2017	Maigret	TV series - 4 episodes	Pioneer Stillking, Budapest
2016	Spark	TV series	Stillking Prague
2015	Legends	TV series – 10 episodes	Stillking Prague
2015	Sons of Liberty	TV mini-series	Icon Stillking, Bucharest
2014	Houdini	TV movie & Mini-Series	Pioneer Stillking, Budapest
2013-2014	Crossing Lines	TV series - 18 episodes	Stillking Prague
2013	Terapie	TV series - 14 episodes	Stillking Prague
2012	Missing	TV series - 10 episodes	Stillking Prague
2009	Masterwork	TV series Pilot	Stillking Prague
2009	The Philanthropist	TV series - 2 episodes	Stillking Prague
2005	Revelations	TV mini-series - 5 episodes	Stillking Prague
2005	Colditz	TV movie	Stillking Prague
2002	Young Arthur	TV series Pilot	Stillking Prague
1999	Passion's Way	TV movie	Stillking Prague
1997	Into Thin Air: Death on Everest	TV movie	Stillking Prague
1996	The Ring	TV mini-series and movie	Stillking Prague

== Personal life ==
In 2004, Stillman married Katherine Driver, a manager and producer who is sister of the actress Minnie Driver. They live in London.

Stillman enjoys cycling and appreciates the clothes of designers such as Acne and John Pearse. The fashion website Mr Porter includes him in its Style Council, a directory of "the world’s best-connected men". Stillman is a director of the children’s cancer charity, the Pink Bubble Foundation.
