= Stillking Films =

Czech media production company

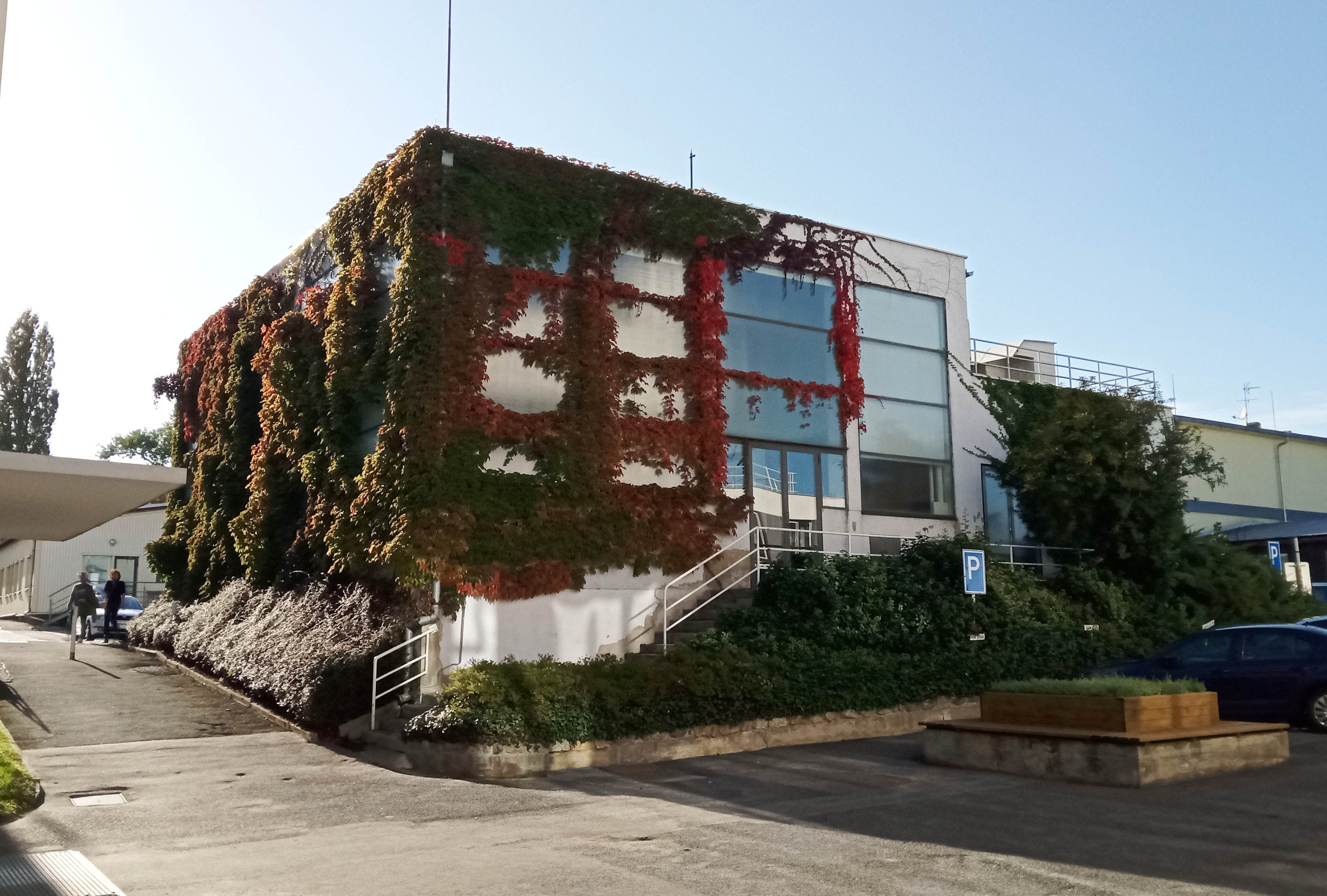
- Stillking Films building, Barrandov Film Studios (2022)
- Type: Private
- Industry: Motion picture, television, music
- Founded: Prague, Czech Republic (1993; 33 years ago)
- Founder: Matthew Stillman
- Headquarters: Prague, Czech Republic
- Number of locations: 8
- Key people: Matthew Stillman
- Products: Casino Royale, Snowpiercer, Legends
- Revenue: 1,893,540,000 Czech koruna (2023)
- Operating income: −16,604,000 Czech koruna (2023)
- Net income: −2,990,000 Czech koruna (2023)
- Total assets: 462,007,000 Czech koruna (2023)
- Number of employees: 6 (2023)
- Subsidiaries: Stillking Cape Town Radio House, Stillking London, Stillking USA, Pioneer Stillking Films
- Website: http://www.stillking.com/

Stillking Films is a film production company headquartered in Prague, Czech Republic. The company offers a range of services in the film production industry, which includes location scouting, casting, equipment rental, and post-production. Over the years, STILLKING FILMS has worked on various high-profile projects, including feature films, commercials, and television series. Some notable works include the movies Casino Royale, Spider-Man: Far From Home and Poor Things.

The company also focuses on producing television series and has recently been involved in projects like an American horror comedy series Wednesday for Netflix and a detective series set in a dark, futuristic Victorian city Carnival Row.

The company’s Music Video & TV commercial division encompasses many successful and critically acclaimed works including productions with Michael Bay, Ridley Scott, Oliver Stone, Tarsem Singh, Michel Gondry, Luke Scott, Dave Meyers, John Hillcoat, Joe Pytka, Danny Kleinman, Lance Accord, Martin Krejci, Tryan George, Antoine Bardou-Jacquet, Olivier Gondry, Sebastian Strasser, Micheal Gracey or Traktor.

== History ==
Stillking was founded by Matthew Stillman in 1993. The company initially produced music videos and TV commercials. The company co-produced its first full-length film in 1995. In the years that followed, the production of feature films became an increasingly important part of the company’s business. The company has also grown, with subsidiaries established in the United Kingdom, South Africa, Spain, Hungary, Romania and Chile.

== Offices ==
- Stillking Films, at Barrandov Film Studios – Prague
- Stillking Cape Town Radio House – Cape Town
- ‘Anima Stillking Films - Malaga
- Stillking WIP - Belgrade
- Pioneer Stillking – Budapest
- Icon Stillking Films – Bucharest
- Stillking London – London
- Stillking USA – Los Angeles

== Works ==
=== Music videos ===
Year	Artist	Song	Director
1995	Ozzy Osbourne	I Just Want You	Dean Karr
1997	Duran Duran	Out Of My Mind	Dean Karr
1997	Mylene Farmer	Désenchantée	Haussman Michael
1997	David Bowie	Hallo Spaceboy	David Mallet
1999	Geri Halliwell	Look At Me	Vaughan Arnell
2001	Basement Jaxx	Where Is Your Head At	Traktor
2002	Prodigy	Baby's Got a Temper	Traktor
2002	Lighthouse Family	Free	Douglas Andrew
2003	Linkin Park	From the Inside	Joe Hahn
2003	Linkin Park	Numb	Joe Hahn
2005	Faithless	Why Go?	Stylewar
2005	Kanye West	Diamonds	Hype Williams
2019	Thom Yorke	Anima	Paul Thomas Anderson
2021	Halsey	Power	Colin Tilley
2023	Zara Larsson	Can't Tame Her	Global
2025	Lizzo	Love in Real Life	Colin Tilley
2025	Lizzo	Still Bad	Colin Tilley

=== Film and television ===
Year	Work	Type	Genre	Director	Starring	Other Production companies	Notes
2024	White Bird	Film	Drama	Marc Forster	Helen Mirren, Gillian Anderson	Lionsgate, Participant	Sequel to Wonder.
2024	Spaceman	Film	Sci-Fi, Drama	Johan Renck	Adam Sandler, Carey Mulligan	Netflix	Based on the novel Spaceman of Bohemia.
2023	Extraction 2	Film	Action, Thriller	Sam Hargrave	Chris Hemsworth	Netflix	Sequel to Extraction.
2022	The Gray Man	Film	Action, Thriller	Anthony and Joe Russo	Ryan Gosling, Chris Evans	Netflix	Based on the novel by Mark Greaney.
2022	Chevalier	Film	Biographical, Drama	Stephen Williams	Kelvin Harrison Jr.	Searchlight Pictures	Based on the life of composer Chevalier de Saint-Georges.
2019	Spider-Man: Far From Home	Film	Action, Sci-Fi	Jon Watts	Tom Holland	Columbia Pictures, Marvel Studios	Sequel to Spider-Man: Homecoming.
2018	Ophelia	Film	Drama	Claire McCarthy	Daisy Ridley, Naomi Watts	Covert Media, Forthcoming Films	A retelling of William Shakespeare's Hamlet.
2017	Interlude in Prague	Film	Historical, Drama	John Stephenson	Aneurin Barnard	Productive International	Based on the life of composer Wolfgang Amadeus Mozart.
2016	Underworld: Blood Wars	Film	Action, Horror	Anna Foester	Kate Beckinsale	Lakeshore Entertainment	
2015	Child 44	Film	Thriller	Daniel Espinosa	Tom Hardy	Worldview Entertainment, Scott Free Productions	
2014–2015	Legends	TV series	Action, Crime		Sean Bean	TNT	
2013	Snowpiercer	Film	Action, Sci-Fi	Bong Joon-ho	Chris Evans	Moho Film, Opus Pictures	The most expensive Korean production ever.
2011	Mission: Impossible – Ghost Protocol	Film	Action	Brad Bird	Tom Cruise	Paramount Pictures	
2009	G.I. Joe: The Rise of Cobra	Film	Action	Stephen Sommers	Channing Tatum	Paramount Pictures	
2009	Masterwork	TV film	Adventure, Thriller	Jeffrey Nachmanoff	Ariyon Bakare	FOX	
2009	The Philanthropist	TV series	Action	Peter Horton	James Purefoy	NBC	
2008	The Chronicles of Narnia: Prince Caspian	Film	Fantasy	Andrew Adamson	Georgie Henley	Walt Disney Pictures	
2008	Quantum of Solace	Film	Action	Martin Campbell	Daniel Craig	Eon Productions	22nd film in James Bond series
2006	The Illusionist	Film	Romantic Mystery	Neil Burger	Edward Norton	Bob Yari Productions, Contagious Entertainment	
2006	Last Holiday	Film	Comedy	Wayne Wang	Queen Latifah	ImageMovers	
2006	Casino Royale	Film	Action	Martin Campbell	Daniel Craig	Eon Productions	21st film in James Bond series
2006	Nodame Cantabile	TV series	Romantic Comedy	Hideki Takeuchi	Juri Ueno	Cine Bazar, Fuji Television Network, Kodansha	Adaptation of Manga comics of the same name.
2006	Tristan & Isolde	Film	Epic romantic drama	Kevin Reynolds	James Franco	20th Century Fox	Based on medieval legend Tristan and Iseult
2005	Revelations	Miniseries	Mystery	Lili Fini Zanuck	Bill Pullman	NBC Universal	
2005	The Chronicles of Narnia: The Lion, the Witch and the Wardrobe	Film	Fantasy	Andrew Adamson	Georgie Henley	Walt Disney Pictures	
2005	Doom	Film	Action Horror	Andrzej Bartkowiak	Karl Urban	Universal Pictures	Based on video game series of the same name
2005	Everything Is Illuminated	Film	Biographical Drama	Liev Schreiber	Elijah Wood	Warner Independent Pictures, Cinetic Media	Adapted from the novel of the same name by Jonathan Safran Foer.
2004	Van Helsing	Film	Action, Horror	Stephen Sommers	Hugh Jackman	Universal Pictures	
2004	The Prince and Me	Film	Romantic Comedy	Martha Coolidge	Julia Stiles	Paramount	
2004	Alien vs. Predator	Film	Action, Sci-Fi	Paul W. S. Anderson	Sanaa Lathan	20th Century Fox	
2003	Shanghai Knights	Film	Action Comedy	David Dobkin	Jackie Chan	Touchstone Pictures, Spyglass Entertainment	
2002	Young Arthur	TV film	Drama	Mikael Salomon	Julian Morris	NBC	
2001	From Hell	Film	Horror, Mystery	Albert Hughes, Allen Hughes	Johnny Depp	FOX	Loosely based on the graphic novel From Hell.
2001	The Mists of Avalon	Miniseries	Fantasy	Uli Edel	Anjelica Huston	Warner Bros, TNT	
1999	The Idiot Returns	Film	Drama	Saša Gedeon	Pavel Liška	Negativ Film/Czech TV	
1999	Plunkett & Macleane	Film	Action, Comedy	Jake Scott	Jonny Lee Miller, Robert Carlyle	USA Films, Working Title	
1996	The Ring	Film	Romantic Drama	Armand Mastroianni	Nastassja Kinski	The Cramer Company, NBC Productions	
