= Christmas candle =

Christmas candle may refer to:

- Advent candle, Christian religious candles used during the Advent season up to Christmas Eve
- Christingle candles
- Christmas decoration candle lights, lights in the form of candles used as decorations for Christmas, see Christmas lights
- The Christmas Candle (2013 film) UK-U.S. Christmas film
- The Christmas Candle (book) (2013 novel) Christmas novel by Max Lucado
- Illumination, placed in windows of Moravian churches and homes at the start of Advent

== See also ==
- Hanukkah candles, see Hanukkah and Menorah (Hanukkah)
- Christmas (disambiguation)
- Candle (disambiguation)
