= The Call Up =

The Call Up may refer to:

- "The Call Up" (song), a 1980 song by the Clash
- The Call Up (film), a 2016 British science fiction thriller film

== See also ==
- Call-up (disambiguation)
