= Literary influence of Hamlet =

Influence of the play by William Shakespeare

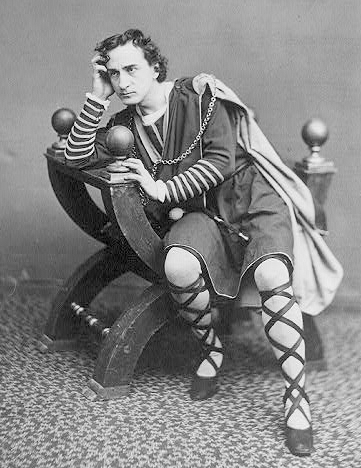
The American actor Edwin Booth as Hamlet, seated in a curule chair c. 1870. (Photographer unknown)

William Shakespeare's Hamlet is a tragedy, believed to have been written between 1599 and 1601. It tells the story of Hamlet, Prince of Denmark—who takes revenge on the current king (Hamlet's uncle) for killing the previous king (Hamlet's father) and for marrying his father's widow (Hamlet's mother)—and it charts the course of his real or feigned madness. Hamlet is the longest play—and Hamlet is the largest part—in the entire Shakespeare canon. Critics say that Hamlet "offers the greatest exhibition of Shakespeare's powers".

Academic Laurie Osborne identifies the direct influence of Hamlet in numerous modern narratives, and divides them into four main categories: fictional accounts of the play's composition, simplifications of the story for young readers, stories expanding the role of one or more characters, and narratives featuring performances of the play.

== Novels and plays ==
Hamlet is one of the most-quoted works in the English language, and often included on lists of the world's greatest literature. As such, it has proved a pervasive influence in literature. For instance, Henry Fielding's Tom Jones, published about 1749, merely describes a visit to Hamlet by Tom Jones and Mr Partridge. In contrast, Goethe's Bildungsroman Wilhelm Meister's Apprenticeship, written between 1776–1796 not only has a production of Hamlet at its core but also dwells on parallels between the Ghost and Wilhelm Meister's dead father. In the early 1850s, in Pierre, Herman Melville focuses on a Hamlet-like character's long development as a writer. Ten years later, Dickens' Great Expectations contains many Hamlet-like plot elements: it is driven by revenge actions, contains ghost-like characters (Abel Magwitch and Miss Havisham), and focuses on the hero's guilt. Academic Alexander Welsh notes that Great Expectations is an "autobiographical novel" and "anticipates psychoanalytic readings of Hamlet itself".

About the same time, George Eliot's The Mill on the Floss was published, introducing Maggie Tulliver "who is explicitly compared with Hamlet". Scholar Marianne Novy suggests that Eliot "demythologises Hamlet by imagining him with a reputation for sanity", notwithstanding his frequent monologues and moodiness towards Ophelia. Novy also suggests Mary Wollstonecraft as an influence on Eliot, critiquing "the trivialisation of women in contemporary society".

Hamlet has played "a relatively small role" in the appropriation of Shakespeare's plays by women writers, ranging from Ophelia, The Fair Rose of Elsinore in Mary Cowden Clarke's 1852 The Girlhood of Shakespeare's Heroines, to Margaret Atwood's 1994 Gertrude Talks Back—in her 1994 collection of short stories Good Bones and Simple Murders—in which the title character sets her son straight about Old Hamlet's murder: "It wasn't Claudius, darling, it was me!"

Also, because of the criticism of the sexism, American author Lisa Klein wrote Ophelia, a novel that portrays Ophelia, too, as feigning madness and surviving.

Author Molly Booth has written a young adult historical fiction novel, Saving Hamlet, about a teenage girl who time travels back to the original production of Hamlet at Shakespeare's Globe Theatre in London, 1601. The book has a focus on Ophelia's role, and how the sexism from Shakespeare's era translates to sexism in modern society for young women. Saving Hamlet was published by Disney Hyperion on November 1, 2016. Also in 2016, Ian McEwan's novel Nutshell was published, which retells Hamlet from the point of view of an unborn child.

== Footnotes ==
All references to Hamlet, unless otherwise specified, are taken from the Arden Shakespeare "Q2" (Thompson and Taylor, 2006a). Under their referencing system, 3.1.55 means act 3, scene 1, line 55. References to the First Quarto and First Folio are marked Hamlet "Q1" and Hamlet "F1", respectively, and are taken from the Arden Shakespeare "Hamlet: the texts of 1603 and 1623" (Thompson and Taylor, 2006b). Their referencing system for "Q1" has no act breaks, so 7.115 means scene 7, line 115.
