= Five Children and It (film) =

2004 film by John Stephenson

- Theatrical release poster
- Directed by: John Stephenson
- Written by: David Solomons
- Based on: Five Children and It by E. Nesbit
- Produced by: Nick Hirschkorn; Lisa Henson; Samuel Hadida
- Starring: Freddie Highmore; Tara FitzGerald; Jonathan Bailey; Zoë Wanamaker; Kenneth Branagh; Eddie Izzard
- Cinematography: Mike Brewster
- Edited by: Michael Ellis
- Music by: Jane Antonia Cornish
- Production companies: Isle of Man Film Commission; The Jim Henson Company; Davis Films; UK Film Council; Endgame Entertainment
- Distributed by: Pathé Distribution (United Kingdom); Warner Home Video (United States); Metropolitan Filmexport (France); Capitol Films (International)
- Release dates: 11 September 2004 (Toronto International Film Festival); 15 October 2004 (United Kingdom)
- Running time: 89 minutes
- Countries: United Kingdom; United States; France
- Language: English
- Box office: $2.3 million

Five Children and It is a 2004 family fantasy-comedy-drama adventure film adaptation of E. Nesbit's 1902 novel Five Children and It, which features live action and computer animation. It was directed by John Stephenson, produced by Nick Hirschkorn, Lisa Henson and Samuel Hadida, written by David Solomons, and stars Tara FitzGerald, Freddie Highmore, Jonathan Bailey, Zoë Wanamaker, Kenneth Branagh, and Eddie Izzard as the voice of It-Psammead.

The film premiered at the Toronto International Film Festival on 11 September 2004 and was theatrically released on 15 October 2004. The digital puppetry and CGI animation for Psammead was created by Jim Henson's Creature Shop. Five Children and It grossed £1,519,049 worldwide. The film was released on DVD on 5 July 2005.

== Plot ==
In the summer of 1917, the Butterworth children (11-year-old Robert, 14-year-old Cyril, 10-year-old Jane, 12-year-old Anthea and 2-year-old The Lamb), whose father has gone to fight in World War I, are evacuated from London to stay with their eccentric Uncle Albert, his housekeeper Martha, and unpleasant son, Horace. While exploring the house, Robert finds a locked door in the forbidden greenhouse and brings the other children. They manage to open the door, which leads them through a secret path to the beach surrounding the house. There they discover a large shelled creature, which reveals itself as a "psammead crustacean decapodlium wishasaurus," or sand fairy for short. The children, befuddled by this confusing name, refer to the creature simply as "It." It seems rather mischievous and Cyril doubts whether the children should trust him, but upon confirming that It can grant wishes, the children wish for all the house chores on their list to be done by magic. When they return to the house, they see dozens of copies of themselves doing the chores and wrecking the house in the attempt.

Suddenly, everything disappears in clouds of golden dust. They are then forced to tidy up the mess themselves. When they return to It and ask why their clones disappeared, It explains that at sunset, all wishes fade away. The children blame It for the mess, but It responds by saying that wishes bring valuable lessons.

The children need money to fix all the broken items, so they wish for buckets of gold and go off into town to buy some items. The children aren't able to buy anything because the owners will not accept gold, believing it is fake. They manage to purchase a car, having nothing else to do with the gold, and end up crashing it during a test drive. Mr. Peasemarsh, the owner, becomes furious and causes a scene with the children as the authorities and Martha both appear on the scene. When Mr. Peasemarsh tries to reveal the children's "stolen gold", it vanishes just before he can show it to the officers, who take him away, believing he is out of his mind.

Horace, meanwhile, is becoming suspicious of the children, and when they refuse to tell him what secret they're hiding, he manages to catch them in a room and locks it, telling them he won't let them out until they come clean. Robert, who was not with the rest when Horace trapped them, goes to It and wishes for wings so they can go off to France and find their father. The other children fly out the window when they discover their new wings, and Horace eventually decides to let them out only to discover them missing and the window open. While flying, the children are almost killed by German zeppelins, but they just barely manage to escape danger. With sunset drawing near, they have no choice but to go home. During their return trip, their wings begin to fade, and it appears they will fall into the sea, but It's face appears among the clouds and blows on the children, sweeping them through the air back to shore.

When the children's mother returns, the children learn that their father has gone missing. Robert talks to It that night, and falls asleep next to It on the beach. Horace, having followed Robert, captures It and brings him to his basement. The next morning, Robert confronts Horace but is unwilling to act, as Horace has his father's compass. Seeing that Horace plans to dissect It to find out how he works his magic, Robert suggests Horace wish for something instead. Interested in the idea, Horace wishes for his fossilized dinosaur egg to hatch. The children arrive in time to see Horace's dinosaur standing high above them and threatening to eat them. After trying to calm it down, It makes the dinosaur vanish. Shocked, Horace faints, and Robert takes him to their mother, while the other children wish for their father to come home. He appears on the beach and talks to the children, but only minutes later he vanishes as sunset hits the beach. Robert, having just nearly missed returning to see him, is devastated.

The children go to Horace, and they talk about what happened in the basement. Horace, surprised at the secret, becomes agreeable, and the children settle their differences, and agree to share the secret of Its existence together. On It's birthday, the children wish It a good future and prepare to return home. When their car breaks down, they are forced to stay in the house and Horace suggests a game of hide-and-seek. As Robert counts, his father appears. When Robert realizes that its really their father, he and the children are overjoyed, joined by their mother. Finally reunited with their father, the children prepare to go home. In a post credits scene, It contemplates a sequel "It and Five Children".

== Cast ==
- Freddie Highmore as Robert
- Jonathan Bailey as Cyril
- Tara Fitzgerald as Mother
- Jessica Claridge as Anthea
- Poppy Rogers as Jane
- Alex Jennings as Father
- Alec Muggleton as Lamb
- Zak Muggleton as Lamb
- Zoë Wanamaker as Martha
- Kenneth Branagh as Uncle Albert
- Alexander Pownall as Horace
- Robert Tygner as It-Psammead (performer)
- Eddie Izzard as It-Psammead (voice)
- Georgio Serafini as Mr. Bialli
- John Sessions as Peasemarsh
- Kim Fenton as RFC Flier
- Norman Wisdom as Nesbitt
- Duncan Preston as Sergeant

== Production ==
On 3 June 2003, John Stephenson was hired and set to direct Five Children and It based on the book of the same name by E. Nesbit. David Solomons wrote the script for the film. Nick Hirschkorn, Lisa Henson and Samuel Hadida produced the film for release in 2004. On 5 June, it was announced that Tara FitzGerald, Freddie Highmore, Alex Jennings, Jonathan Bailey, Jessica Claridge, Poppy Rogers, Alec Muggleton, Zak Muggleton, Zoë Wanamaker, Kenneth Branagh, Alexander Pownall, Georgio Serafini, John Sessions, Kim Fenton, Norman Wisdom and Duncan Preston joined the film. Eddie Izzard joined the cast on 8 July to voice It-Psammead. The film uses live action for the humans and computer animation for It-Psammead. Development and animation of the film was completed in England, UK and Isle of Man.

=== Music ===
On 15 July, it was announced that Jane Antonia Cornish would compose the music for the film. The film's soundtrack also contains “Happy Birthday to You” written by Patty S. Hill (as Patty Hill) and Mildred J. Hill (as Mildred Hill) and “Robert's Theme” written and performed by Sean Lennon.

=== Filming locations ===
Filming took place across locations in England and the Isle of Man.

== Release ==
The film premiered at the Toronto International Film Festival on 11 September 2004 and was theatrically released on 15 October 2004 by Pathé and Icon Productions.

=== Home media ===
Five Children and It was released only on DVD on 5 July 2005 by Warner Home Video in North America.

== Reception ==
=== Critical response ===
On the review aggregator website Rotten Tomatoes, 63% of 8 critics' reviews are positive.

Empire stated that it was "a refreshing family film and once you're on the wavelength, Izzard is a treat", giving the film 3 out of 5 stars. Time Out London was less praising, stating that the cast "shuffle[d] through their parts" and lamenting the special effects, but praising Eddie Izzard.

=== Box office ===
Five Children and It grossed £1,519,049 worldwide.

== Awards and nominations ==
- BAFTA Awards 2005

Won Anthony Asquith Award for Best New British Composer (TV) - Jane Antonia Cornish

- Heartland Film Festival 2005

Won Crystal Heart Award

== Soundtrack ==
- Happy Birthday to You - Written by Patty S. Hill (as Patty Hill) and Mildred J. Hill (as Mildred Hill)
- Robert's Theme - Written and Performed by Sean Lennon
