= The Colours (play) =

2019 play by Harriet Madeley

- Original language: English
- Written by: Harriet Madeley
- Setting: A hospice facility in Wales

Premiere
- Date: 30 July 2019
- Place: Soho Theatre; London, England

The Colours is a 2019 play written by Harriet Madeley and directed by Max Barton. It is a verbatim play about end of life care in a Welsh hospice. Amongst the performers for its first staging in the West End of London was the actress Morfydd Clark. The play was created using recorded conversations with patients, doctors and nurses at Velindre Cancer Centre and Ty Olwen Hospice in Wales, and actors revoiced the recordings verbatim on stage. All the characters in the play are created from interviews with real people.

== Synopsis ==
The play centres around the lives of four people with varying types of illness, and their interactions with those around them. It also focuses on the conversations with healthcare professionals, in particular those who work in palliative care. The actors on stage in this verbatim play, voice the actual transcripts of interviews held with patients and doctors in South Wales in two sites: Velindre Cancer Hospital in Cardiff and Ty Olwen Hospice in Swansea.

The play opens on a South Wales beach. We meet Jill and Joe in their home in South Wales. Jill, 60, has had a cancer scare, but the lumps in her breast turned out to be benign; Joe's prostate cancer is inoperable. Jill is cheerful, still thinking of future days, fussing over her vinyl collection, while Joe is anxious, but also resigned to what lies ahead. The play engaged a gender-blind casting approach, and Ché Francis plays Jill, his eyes perfectly matching the mischief in the voice he hears in his ears, whilst Joe is played by Morfydd Clark, who communicates the fear of a 65-year-old man entering the very last days of his life.

Erica, played by Claire-Marie Hall, is a single woman, cheerful to the last, regaling with stories of her past as a teacher. We also meet Ray, played by Mark Knightley, who is dying from motor neurone disease, but copes using gallows humour and candour. Joe, Erica and Ray meet and become friends at a hospice, which provides activities such as meditation, painting and Tai Chi.

A clinician appears throughout the play, voiced by several of the actors and giving information about the diagnoses and on what palliative care can offer.

== Premiere ==
The verbatim play was premiered at Soho Theatre from 30 July to 17 August 2019. Post-show talks were held on 8 August with Idris Baker, palliative care consultant at Ty Olwen hospice, and on 10 August with Mark Taubert, palliative care consultant at Velindre Cancer Centre in Cardiff.

== Creating the Colours ==
All the characters in the play were created from interviews with real people living with terminal illnesses: attendees of Ty Olwen hospice in Swansea and Velindre Cancer Centre in Cardiff. Interviews to create the play were conducted throughout 2018 by writer Harriet Madeley with patients, doctors, nurses and volunteers at Velindre Cancer Centre in Cardiff and Ty Olwen Hospice in Swansea. Recorded interviews were then played through the actors' headphones, providing their lines in real time. Madeley first had the idea to write a play about end of life care after reading a book her friend's father had written whilst living with terminal cancer. "I was struck by the way his diagnosis had caused him to view life in a different way, and it really stayed with me" she says. "I then saw palliative care doctor Mark Taubert speak at the Hay Festival on the subject of palliative care, he introduced me to Dr Idris Baker at Ty Olwen Hospice in Swansea and the play was born. She then spent time interviewing Taubert and Baker, as well as patients and healthcare professionals in both clinicians' South Wales settings. The play features a physician called "Dr Taubert-Baker", who represents an amalgamation of the two palliative care doctors.

== Premiere cast and production team ==
The cast for The Colours included Morfydd Clark, Claire-Marie Hall, Che Francis, Mark Knightley, and Harriet Madeley. The theatre company was Crowded Room. The set was designed by Luke W. Robson, lighting by Jo Palmer and sound by Ellie Isherwood.

Joe: Morfydd Clark

Jill: Ché Francis

Erica: Claire-Marie Hall

Ray: Mark Knightley

Dr. Taubert-Baker: Mark Knightley, Harriet Madeley and Morfydd Clark

== Reception ==
The play received a positive reception following its premiere in the West End, including from Time Out magazine who commented that the play "works as a constant reminder of the preciousness of the time passing during even the most seemingly mundane conversations. Together, Barton and writer Harriet Madeley conjure an atmosphere of quiet reflection – a moving understatedness.". The Evening Standard concluded that "the show is at its most insightful when we hear the patients' idle chit-chat. We don't often hear people shooting the breeze about the fact that their death is imminent. People are brave; they think of their families. There's power in the not-said as much as in the spoken.".

In 2023, The University Of Bristol featured the play and a talk about its creation in its annual Good Grief Festival.
