= Morfydd Clark =

Welsh actress (born 1989)

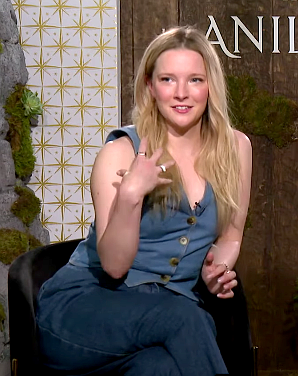
- Clark in 2022
- Born: 17 March 1989 (age 37); Lidingö, Uppland, Sweden
- Citizenship: British
- Occupation: Actress
- Years active: 2013–present

Morfydd Clark (Welsh pronunciation: [ˈmɔrvɪð]; born 17 March 1989) is a Welsh actress. She is best known for playing Galadriel in the Amazon Prime Video series The Lord of the Rings: The Rings of Power (2022–present). She received a number of accolades for her performance in the film Saint Maud (2019), including a BAFTA Cymru as well as BIFA and BAFTA Rising Star Award nominations.

Clark's other films include a leading role in folk-horror film, Starve Acre (2023), and supporting credits in Love & Friendship (2016), Interlude in Prague (2017), The Personal History of David Copperfield (2019) and Ophelia in Hamlet (2025). Also on television, she played Mina Harker in Dracula (2020), Sister Clara in His Dark Materials (2019) and Bridget Conway in Murder is Easy (2023).

== Early life ==
Clark was born in Lidingö in Greater Stockholm (Uppland, Sweden) on 17 March 1989. She moved with her family to Penarth, Wales when she was 2 years old. Her mother is a paediatrician whose lineage comes from North Wales, and described her father as a "Northern Irish Glaswegian" who works in software and security. She also has a younger sister, Siwan. Her parents speak English together, but her maternal grandparents are Welsh speakers which led to her attending a Welsh language school, Ysgol Gymraeg Bro Morgannwg. She is bilingual in English and Welsh.

Her first acting experience was playing Mrs Dai Bread in a school production of Under Milk Wood. After struggling with dyslexia and ADHD, she left school at sixteen. She later completed her A Levels at Kings Monkton School in Cardiff. In 2009, she was accepted to British Youth Music Theatre's production of According to Brian Haw and to the National Youth Theatre of Wales, before training at the Drama Centre London.

== Career ==
=== 2013–2021: Early career ===
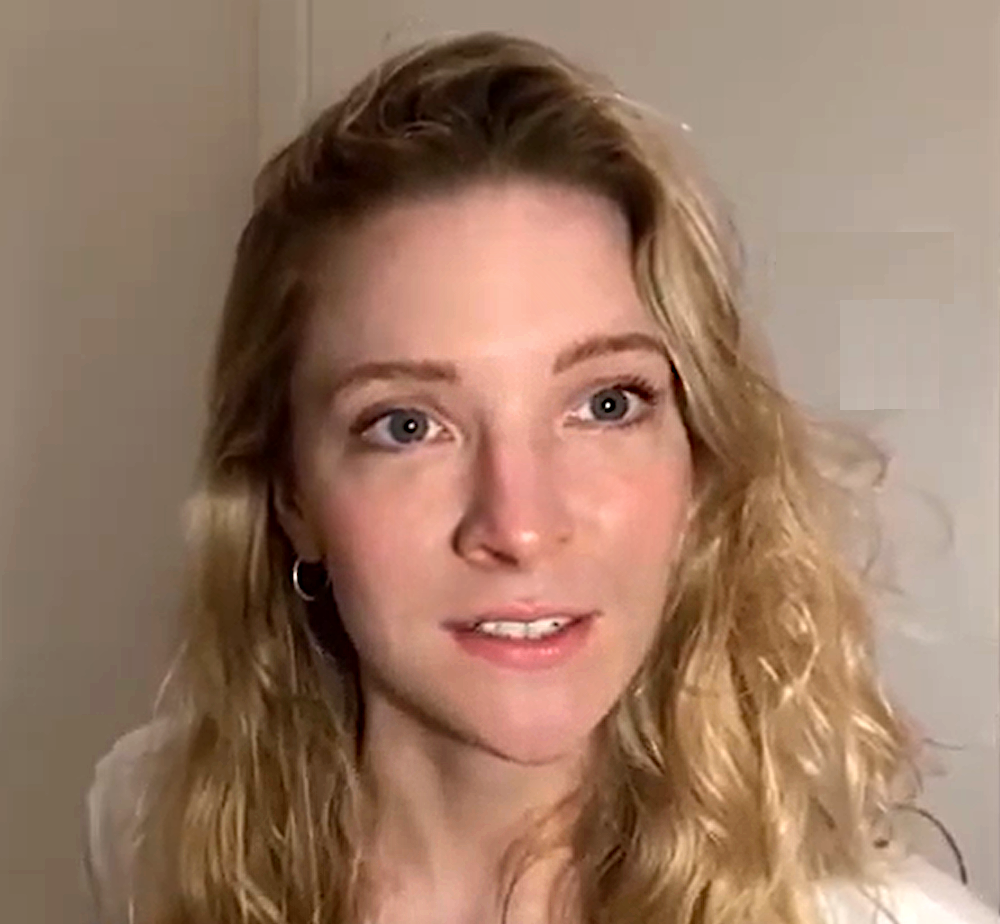
Clark in 2020

In 2013, Clark left Drama Centre in her final term to star in Saunders Lewis's play Blodeuwedd with Theatr Genedlaethol Cymru. She has appeared in Violence and Son at the Royal Court, as Juliet in Romeo and Juliet at the Crucible Theatre, Sheffield, and in Les Liaisons Dangereuses at the Donmar Warehouse. She played Frederica Vernon in Whit Stillman's film Love & Friendship. In 2016, Clark was named as one of the Screen International Stars of Tomorrow for her early work in television and theatre. She appeared in the film The Call Up and as Cordelia in King Lear at The Old Vic. In 2017, she starred in Interlude In Prague, and portrayed Catherine Dickens in The Man Who Invented Christmas.

In 2019, she appeared in the films Crawl, The Personal History of David Copperfield, and Eternal Beauty. Also that year, Clark starred as Maud in the psychological horror film Saint Maud, for which she was nominated for Best Actress of the 2020 British Independent Film Awards. For her performance as Maud, she won the BAFTA Cymru best actress award, and was nominated for the 2021 BAFTA Rising Star Award.

=== 2022–present: The Rings of Power ===
Clark played the character Galadriel in The Lord of the Rings: The Rings of Power on Amazon Prime (a younger version of the character found in The Lord of the Rings). She was so shocked when she was cast in the role that she fainted.

Clark has cited that she is "proud" that being a Welsh speaker influenced her portrayal of her bilingual character, Galadriel. The actor stated, "I feel I can be much more romantic and deep in Welsh. So that was really useful for me, because I was thinking, '[What's the] language of her heart? What language does she think in?'" In another interview, the actor discussed her education in Welsh: "Well, I went to a Welsh language school and everything is taught in Welsh. Welsh is phonetic, so it's great for people with dyslexia. I started learning English in the third year. What my Tolkien-obsessed mother was really proud of and passed on to us was that Tolkien was inspired by the Welsh. Oddly enough, his work was a badge of honour for me, because the Welsh are Welsh and obsessed with anything Welsh." She also mentioned enjoying speaking in Welsh on-set with co-stars Owain Arthur and Trystan Gravelle.

== Filmography ==
=== Film ===
Year	Title	Role	Notes
2014	Madame Bovary	Camille	
2014	The Falling	Pamela Charron	
2016	Pride and Prejudice and Zombies	Georgiana Darcy	
2016	Love & Friendship	Frederica Vernon	
2016	The Call Up	Shelly	
2017	Interlude in Prague	Zuzanna Luptak	
2017	The Man Who Invented Christmas	Kate Dickens	
2019	Crawl	Beth Keller	
2019	The Personal History of David Copperfield	Dora Spenlow / Clara Copperfield	
2019	Eternal Beauty	young Jane	
2019	Saint Maud	Katie / Maud	
2023	Starve Acre	Juliette	
2025	Hamlet	Ophelia	
2028	The Beatles – A Four-Film Cinematic Event †	Cynthia Lennon	Filming

=== Television ===
Year	Title	Role	Notes
2014	New Worlds	Amelia	Television miniseries
2014	A Poet in New York	Nancy Wickwire	Television film
2015	Arthur & George	Mary	Episode: "1.1"
2016	National Theatre Live: Les Liaisons Dangereuses	Cécile Volanges	
2018	The Alienist	Caroline Bell	Episode: "Silver Smile"
2018	The City and the City	Yolanda Stark	Episodes: "Breach," "Orciny"
2018	Patrick Melrose	Debbie Hickman	Episodes: "Bad News," "Some Hope"
2018	Outsiders	Mari	Television film
2019	His Dark Materials	Sister Clara	4 episodes
2020	Dracula	Mina Harker	Television miniseries
2022–present	The Lord of the Rings: The Rings of Power	Galadriel	Main role
2023	Murder is Easy	Bridget	Two-part drama
2026	Adventure Time: Side Quests	Infernorosa (voice)	Episode: Son of the Goblin Queen

== Theatre ==
Year	Play	Role	Theatre company	Director (Writer)	Notes
2013	Blodeuwedd	Blodeuwedd	Theatr Genedlaethol Cymru	Arwel Griffiths (Saunders Lewis)	
2015	Violence and Son	Jen	The Royal Court	Hamish Pirie (Gary Owen)	
2015	Romeo and Juliet	Juliet	The Crucible Theatre	Jonathan Humphreys (William Shakespeare)	
2015	Les Liaisons Dangereuses	Cecile	The Donmar Warehouse	Josie Rourke (Christopher Hampton)	
2016	King Lear	Cordelia	The Old Vic	Deborah Warner (William Shakespeare)	
2017	The Cherry Orchard	Anya	The Sherman	Rachel O'Riordan (Anton Chekhov/Gary Owen)	
2019	The Colours	Joe	Soho Theatre	Max Barton (Harriet Madeley)	
2024	Look Back In Anger	Helena Charles	Almeida	Atri Banerjee (John Osborne)	
2024	Roots	Beatie Bryant	Almeida	Diyan Zora (Arnold Wesker)	

== Awards and nominations ==
Year	Award	Category	Work	Result	Ref.
2020	Dublin Film Critics' Circle	Breakthrough Award	Saint Maud and The Personal History of David Copperfield	Won	
2020	Sunset Film Circle Awards	Best Actress	Saint Maud	Nominated	
2021	London Critics' Circle Film Awards	British/Irish Actress of the Year	Saint Maud and Eternal Beauty	Won	
2021	London Critics' Circle Film Awards	Actress of the Year	Saint Maud	Nominated	
2021	British Independent Film Awards	Best Actress	Saint Maud	Nominated	
2021	BAFTA Cymru	Best Actress	Saint Maud	Won	
2021	British Academy Film Awards	Rising Star Award	Saint Maud	Nominated	
2022	Fangoria Chainsaw Awards	Best Lead Performance	Saint Maud	Nominated	
2023	Critics' Choice Super Awards	Best Actress in a Science Fiction/Fantasy Series	The Lord of the Rings: The Rings of Power	Nominated	
2023	Canneseries	Madame Figaro Rising Star Award	The Lord of the Rings: The Rings of Power	Won	
2026	National Film Awards UK	Best Supporting Actress	Hamlet	Nominated	
