= Anna Rust =

English actress

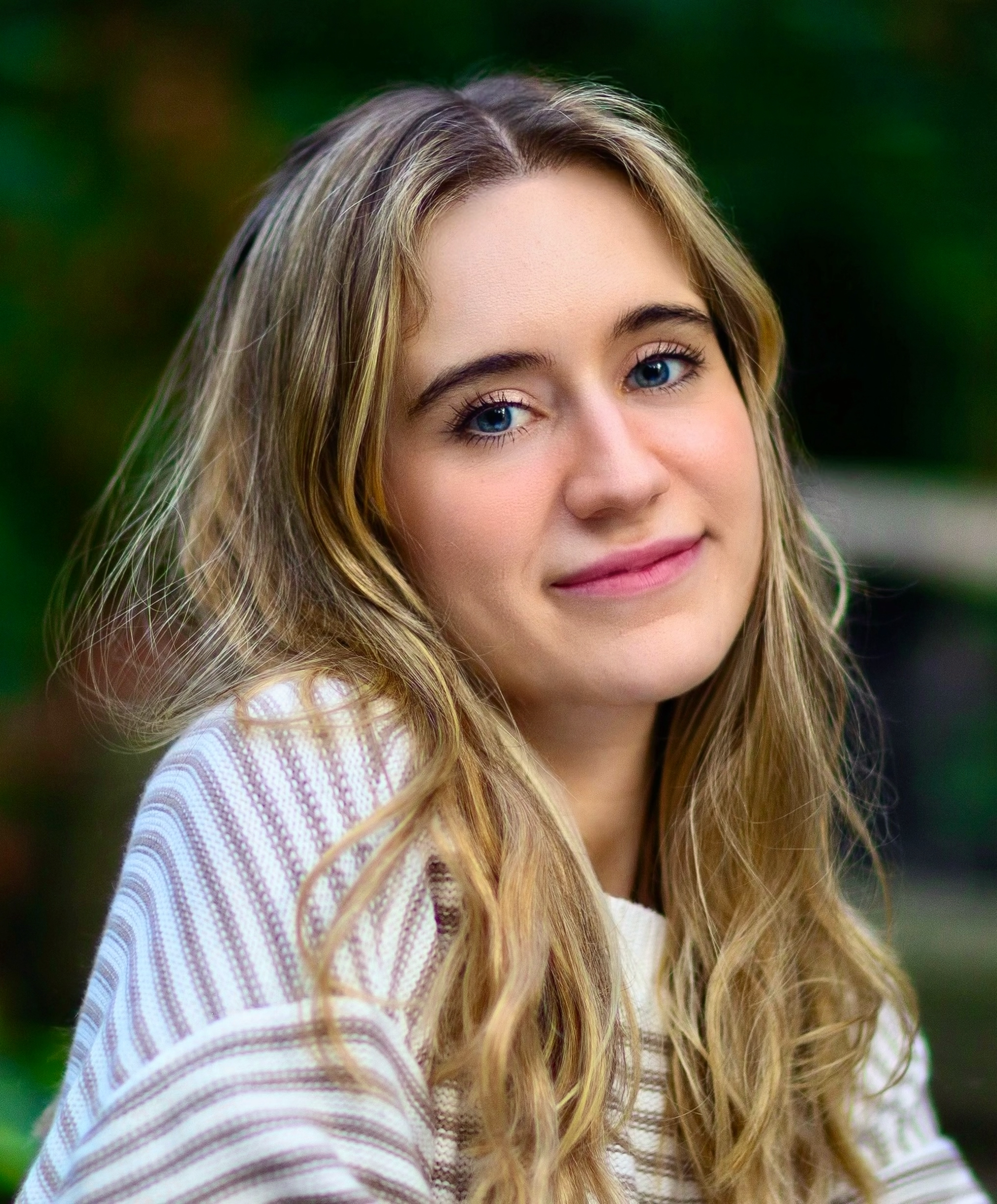
- Rust in 2026
- Education: Bristol Old Vic Theatre School
- Occupations: Actress, director, writer

Anna Rust is an English actress and filmmaker. She began her career as a child actress in the ITV drama Doctor Zhivago (2002) and the film The Brothers Grimm (2005). She has since appeared in the Amazon Prime series Carnival Row (2019), the second season of Legends (2015), and the films Interlude in Prague (2017) and Ophelia (2018).

== Early life ==
Anna Rust was born to British parents Will Rust, who works in advertising and branding, and Clare Bryant, who works in fashion. She moved around growing up for her parents' work, living and attending international schools in the likes of Berlin, Budapest, and Kyiv; she can speak six languages as a result of her international childhood.

== Career ==
Rust made her television debut as Katya Antipova in the 2002 ITV miniseries adaptation of Doctor Zhivago and her film debut as Sister Grimm in the 2005 fantasy film The Brothers Grimm.

Rust later returned to acting, starring in the short film Bloody Weekend and The Missionary pilot in 2013 and make a guest appearance in an episode of the NBC series Crossing Lines in 2014. In 2015, Rust played Khava Bazaeva in the second season of the TNT series Legends. She starred in the 2017 film Interlude in Prague and 2018 film Ophelia.

In 2020, Rust played Fleury in Carnival Row, the Pix courtesan at Moira's brothel. In a red carpet interview, Rust told the Daily Express about her character: "There's a little bit of stigma around sex work generally and I think a lot of the time people are under the impression that you are only ever forced into it. I don't think there was a lot of choice for [Fleury] because all of the mythical creatures don't have many job opportunities but I don’t think it was something that she was entirely against, which I think is quite cool."

Rust made her directorial debut with Satiety, which screened at a number of film festivals and earned her a number of accolades, including Best Actress at the Venice Short Film Festival. She began production on it in March 2020, and resumed when COVID-19 lockdown restrictions were relaxed. She appeared in the 2021 HBO miniseries Scenes from a Marriage.

Rust has lent her voice to video games such as Final Fantasy XIV (voicing Gaia), Call of Duty: Modern Warfare III, Horizon Forbidden West, Cyberpunk 2077, Star Wars Battlefront 2, Starfield and Battlefield V.

== Personal life ==
Rust is an outspoken activist for animal rights, LGBT representation, feminism, and diversity in film. Speaking about the importance of film and TV in making societal change, she said: "I’ve always said that film & TV – and games, for that matter – can change the world through exposure. And I really hope we can … continue to make change through art – be it destigmatize sex work, or dismantle racism, or getting people to be compassionate towards animals." She is pansexual.

She has spoken about her dream role being Marvel's Black Cat, as well as working in The Elder Scrolls series.

== Filmography ==
=== Film ===
Year	Title	Role	Notes
2005	The Brothers Grimm	Sister Grimm	
2013	Bloody Weekend	Anna Bella	Short film
2017	Interlude in Prague	Hana	
2018	Ophelia	Young Mechtild	
2020	Intelligent Design	Megan Lauper	
2021	Satiety	Maya Mortimer	Director, writer, producer
2023	It Had To Be You	Elle Peterson	
2025	DRAGN	Amanda Wilson	
2027	Speak Up	Deanna Carter	

=== Television ===
Year	Title	Role	Notes
2002	Doctor Zhivago	Katya Antipova	Miniseries
2013	The Missionary	Joan	Pilot
2014	Crossing Lines	Ammelie Weurfel	Episode: "Everybody Will Know"
2015	Legends	Khava Bazaeva	3 episodes
2019	Carnival Row	Fleury	1 season
2019	Carnival Row: Outskirts	Fleury	1 season (miniseries)
2021	Scenes from a Marriage	Veronica	Episode: "The Illiterates"
2022	Last Light	Anna	Episode: "Twilight"
2022- 2024	Kleo	Kleo Straub (voice)	2 seasons
2026	City of Blood	Lena Berger	

=== Video games ===
Year	Title	Role	Notes
2017	Arktika.1 (4A Games)	Viktoria Morozov	
2017	Star Wars Battlefront II		
2018	Battlefield V		
2019	Final Fantasy XIV: Shadowbringers	Gaia / Oracle of Darkness	
2020	Cyberpunk 2077	Vera	
2021	Final Fantasy XIV: Endwalker	Gaia, Azdaja / Zeromus	
2022	Dying Light 2: Stay Human	Loes	
2022	Horizon Forbidden West	Nakalla	
2023	Reverse: 1999	Druvis III	
2023	Call of Duty: Modern Warfare III	Olga	
2023	Cyberpunk 2077: Phantom Liberty	Vera	
2024	Final Fantasy XIV: Dawntrail	Gaia / Oracle of Darkness	
2024	Starfield: Shattered Space	Hanton Irara	
2024	The Elder Scrolls V: Skyrim	Ashe	

=== Music videos ===
- "Straight Across The Sun" (2016)
