= Call-up =

Call-up may refer to:

- Conscription or the draft
- Call-up (baseball), baseball term

== See also ==
- The Call Up (disambiguation)
