= Jane Antonia Cornish =

English-American composer

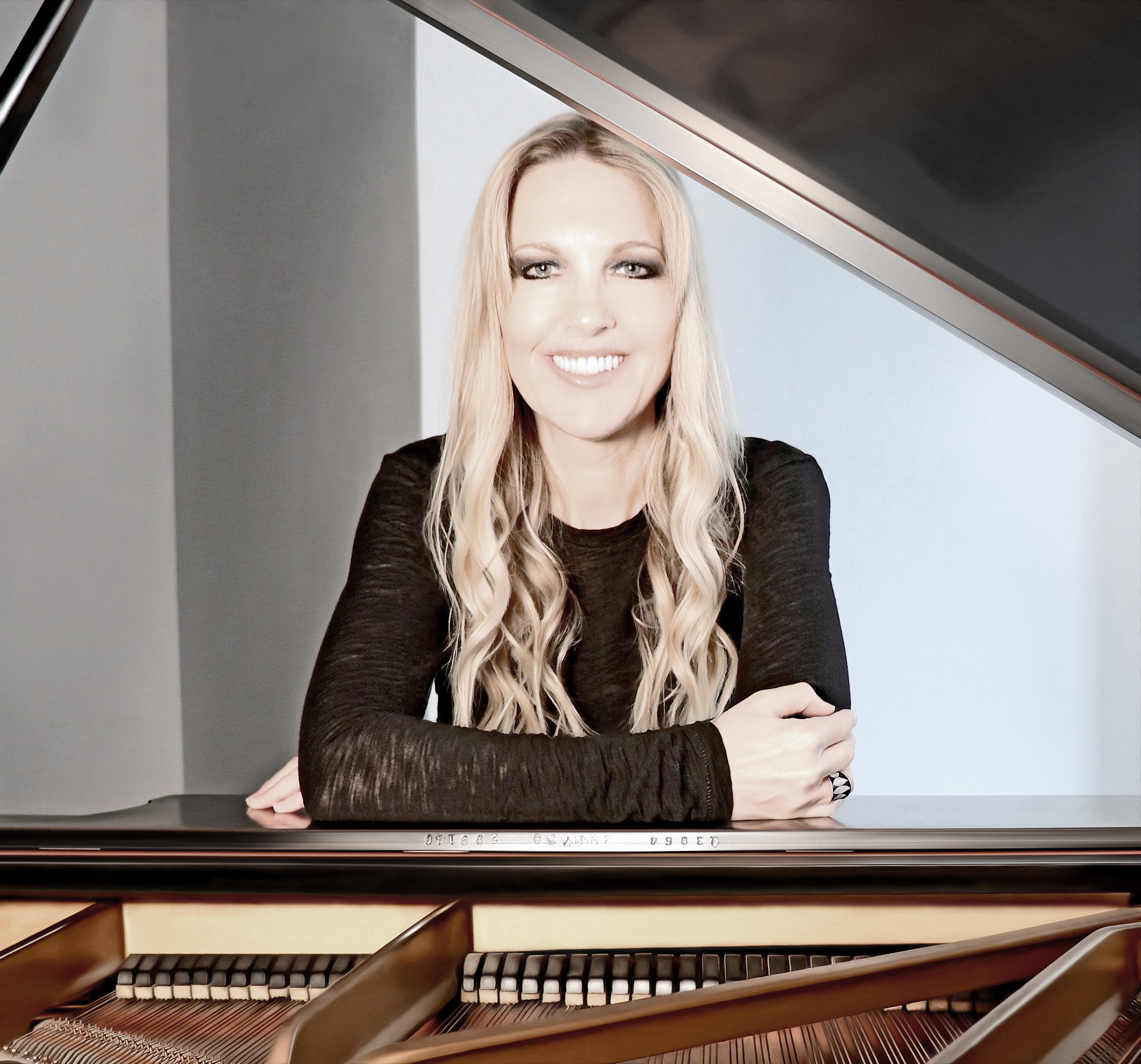

Background information
- Born: London, England
- Genre: Contemporary classical
- Occupation: Composer

Jane Antonia Cornish is an English composer. She is based in Los Angeles, California, and focuses on contemporary classical music.

== Early life and education ==
Cornish grew up in Kent, England, where she studied violin, piano and composition from an early age. She went to the Folkestone School for Girls in Kent and then studied composition with Anthony Gilbert at the Royal Northern College of Music. She completed her master's degree at the Royal College of Music. She is a recipient of the Edward Hecht Composition Prize, the RNCM Composition Prize and the Associated Board Prize for the Most Outstanding Scholar of the Year. Cornish was also made a Major Scholar of the RNCM.

== Music ==
=== Solo albums ===
==== Duende ====
Delos released Cornish's first chamber music album, Duende, in April 2014. The album was met with critical acclaim. Fanfare described it as "extraordinarily deep music". Barry Kilpatrick at American Record Guide said it "...grabbed my attention immediately and never let go." Artists featured on the album include Miranda Cuckson, Blair McMillen and The Lee Trio.

==== Continuum ====
Innova Recordings released the album Continuum on 31 July 2015. It was performed by Decoda, Carnegie Hall's Affiliate Ensemble. WQXR wrote: "Continuum is a font of wistfulness and melancholic beauty", and named it Q2 Music Album of the Week. Continuum was also featured on WNYC-FM's New Sounds.

==== Into Silence ====
Innova Recordings released the album Into Silence on 25 August 2017. Music from the album has been played on BBC Radio 3, KEXP and WNYC-FM's New Sounds. John Schaefer commented that the work had "unappeased yearning" with a "tender earthbound comfort". New York City Ballet principal Ask la Cour choreographed a pas de deux to the title track which was filmed and released with the album. Dance Spirit Magazine featured the film and described it as "impossibly gorgeous shapes form and dissolve in the haunting black-and-white setting of the Martha Graham Studios in NYC". The pas de deux was performed as part of the Stars of American Ballet tour in 2017 by Ask la Cour and Teresa Reichlen.

==== Constellations ====
Constellations was released on July 27, 2018. "Lux" from the album was featured on WNYC-FM's New Sounds, and was described as "a long-form spacious sound structure created from acoustic instruments like piano and strings, but stretched with electronics into an entire musical cosmos." Tom Schnabel at KCRW called Constellations "patient, virtuosic and mesmerizing", and included it in his August Music mix.

==== Seascapes ====
Seascapes was released in August 2019. It was featured on WNYC-FM's New Sounds July New Releases show. The album was met with positive critical acclaim. World Music Report described Seascapes as "...absolutely breathtaking. The work is set in three separate sequences, each seeming to transpose the immense aspect of a sea that is observed, heard and felt as by body, mind and spirit."

Seascapes I, II and III from the album were premiered at the Chelsea Music Festival in June 2019, conducted by Ken-David Masur. Broadway World reviewed the concert: "Sensitively conducted by Ken-David Masur, the ethereal three movement work held the audience in absolute stillness at its conclusion. This was the World Premiere performance of Seascapes. May it have a long and happy life."

==== Sierra ====
Sierra was released by Cantaloupe Music on April 22, 2022. The album was written for multiple pianos, all performed by Bang on a Can All-Star Vicky Chow. The album has been played on BBC Radio 3, New Sounds and KEXP's Pacific Notions. The Whole Note Magazine reviewed Sierra: "The lush, and luscious, pieces are beautifully performed, their multiple layers seamlessly interwoven to produce an entrancing experience." VAN Magazine wrote, "Cornish’s landscape is lush, sun-baked, and a little hazy in the afternoon light, and Chow is adept and adroit at bringing out the glistening imagery painted in each track, with synesthetic titles like "Sky," "Ocean," "Sunglitter," and "Last Light."

One of the tracks on the album, "Last Light", was written for artist Noah Buchanan's painting Symphony. "Last Light" was painted into the work. Cornish said, "I aimed to compose something that would not only sound beautiful, but look beautiful in the painting as well."

The album release concert for Sierra was held at Roulette Intermedium on April 18, 2022. It was an immersive concert with art direction and light design by Ben Toht and a live surround mix by Dan Bora.

Lumina

Lumina, Jane Antonia’s seventh studio album was released July 2026 by Illumine Records. The album debuted on KEXP Radio’s Pacific Notions and was featured on BBC Radio 3, described by Elizabeth Alker as “A source of light when we need it the most”.

=== Film scores ===
Cornish has also written music for films, and was the first woman to win a British Academy Award (BAFTA) for music. She has scored many films, including Fireflies in the Garden, which stars Julia Roberts and Ryan Reynolds, and Five Children and It. She was named one of the UK Film Council's Breakthrough Brits in Hollywood in 2005. She was nominated for Breakthrough Composer of the Year by the International Film Music Critics Association, and was nominated for a Robert Award for Best Score for her soundtrack to Island of Lost Souls.

Cornish has also orchestrated films, including Kung Fu Panda and Maleficent. She was the composer for the 2017 documentary film Scotty and the Secret History of Hollywood.

=== Ballet ===
The Royal Swedish Ballet commissioned Joseph Sturdy to choreograph a new work to be performed and filmed at the Swedish Opera House. The ballet is called Sonatra, and is set to music by Cornish and Michael Gordon.

New York City Ballet principal Ask la Cour choreographed a pas de deux to the title track of Cornish's album Into Silence. It was performed by Stars of American Ballet as a part of their national tour. The film of the ballet was reviewed by Dance Spirit magazine: "In this pas de deux to "Into Silence" by award-winning movie composer Jane Antonia Cornish, impossibly gorgeous shapes form and dissolve in the haunting black-and-white setting of the Martha Graham Studios in NYC."

The Norwegian National Ballet commissioned and performed Inquiet, a ballet by choreographer Lucien Alan Øyen, which featured music by Jane Antonia.

== Awards ==
In 2005, Cornish was awarded a British Academy of Film and Television Arts (BAFTA) for Television Craft: Anthony Asquith Award for New British Composer, for her work on Five Children and It. She was the first woman to win a BAFTA for music. In 2008, ASCAP's Rudolf Nissim Prize jury honoured Cornish with a Special Distinction for her orchestral tone poem, Symphony. The Academy of Motion Pictures Arts and Sciences invited Jane Antonia Cornish to become a member in 2019.
