= Ben Radcliffe =

Ben Radcliffe is the name of:

- Ben Radcliffe (actor), English actor
- Ben Radcliffe (footballer), English footballer
