= The Christmas Candle (novel) =

2006 novel by Max Lucado

First edition (publ. Thomas Nelson)

The Christmas Candle is a Christmas novel written by Max Lucado, published in 2006. It is about a couple who own a candle shop, and every generation they are visited by an angel who, by touching a candle, can give miracles to whoever they give it to.

In 2013, it was adapted by John Stephenson into a film of the same name, starring Hans Matheson and Samantha Barks.

== Plot ==
The story starts before Christmas in the Village of Gladstone 1664 where the first Haddington couple are approached by the angel who by touching a candle in their shop can create miracles who anyone who they give it to and must carry on generation after generation. Centuries later, in 1864, Edward Haddington and his wife Bea are nearing Christmas, and the village people are gossiping already about the Christmas Candle as it is nearing the time. When the village gather for church, Reverend Richmond refuses to mention the Christmas Candle as it is not part of the church ceremony, which everyone is disappointed about. Meanwhile, Edward and Bea are unsure as to whom to give the candle to when the angel comes as there are so many who are in need for a miracle. Bea mentions about using the Candle for her and Edward as they might be in need for it. Finally when the angel does come and touches the candle Edward falls and knocks all the candles, including the Christmas Candle, on the floor making it impossible to tell which one.

Without telling each other, at first, Edward and Bea take the basket of candles, which is holding the Christmas one, to the villagers feeling guilty that only one of them will receive the miracle and that they would protest with no miracle. One day Reverend Richmond explains to Edward and Bea that when he was young he went on a drunken reck and with his friends ridden a wagon over a cliff killing one of his friends and how Richmond would spend the rest of his life regretting, it so Edward gives him a candle out of sympathy. When the villagers all gather for church on Christmas Eve the villagers who were given a candle received a miracle each, then suddenly a man bursts into the church saying a girl and her baby are in trouble near a bridge.

Edward and the reverend run to the bridge, but Richmond falls in the stream and tells Edward to light his candle. He does and the light illuminates the scene. Then Edward finds the girl and her baby and with the help of the villagers takes her home to rest with her child. Then Edward and Bea realize that she is their granddaughter who ran away from them because of a mistake she thought they would never forgive her for. Edward says "Looks like God still gives babies at Christmas". In the end, the Haddington family, set in modern times, are approached by the same angel giving the touch to the Christmas Candle.

== Characters ==
- Edward Haddington The main character who is entrusted with the responsibility of the Christmas Candle.
- Bea Haddington Edward Haddington's wife who is also trusted with the Christmas Candle.
- Reverend Richmond The Church leader who doesn't believe the Christmas Candle tradition is relevant to the village religions.
- Abigail Haddington Edward and Bea Haddington's daughter who runs away thinking she did wrong and had a child she kept.
