= John Stephenson (director) =

British director (born 1952)

- Born: 28 May 1952 (age 73); London, England
- Occupations: Filmmaker, director, special effects
- Years active: 1980–present
- Children: 3

John Stephenson, OBE (born 28 May 1952) is a British director and a former vice-president and creative supervisor for Jim Henson's Creature Shop. He was nominated for a BAFTA film award in 1985 for Dreamchild and in 1991, he won an Academy Award by the Academy of Motion Picture Arts and Sciences.

== Early life ==
Stephenson was born in London, England. Educated at the Kingston School of Art and then the Royal College of Art, graduating in 1979. He moved to the USA and had a brief spell working as a designer of prestigious-fashion West End Interiors in Los Angeles.

== Career ==
Joining the Jim Henson's Creature Shop in the early 80s, Stephenson became a member of the unique group of artists designers and crafts people working on the ground-breaking film The Dark Crystal. in addition to working as a mechanical designer, he also served as an assistant cable control puppeteer on Dreamchild. Subsequently, in 1985, he became Creative Supervisor and later served as Executive Vice President and CEO of the Creature Shop.

His work for Henson productions included The Storyteller (TV series), Labyrinth (1986 film), The Witches (1990 film), and Dinosaurs (TV Series). Stephenson art directed Jacque Annaud's The Bear (1988 film) and contributed to the film Teenage Mutant Ninja Turtles (1990 film) for which Jim Henson's Creature Shop provided ninja turtle suit puppets.

In 1987, along with two other colleagues, Stephenson was nominated for a BAFTA film award for best special visual effects in the 1985 British drama film Dreamchild.

In the 1991 64th Academy Awards, John, along with four other colleagues, received a Scientific and Engineering Award by the Academy of Motion Picture Arts and Sciences for the development of the Henson Performance Control System. In the same year, he was also nominated in the Saturn Award for Best Make-up at the Academy of Science Fiction, Fantasy and Horror Films for his work in The Witches (1990 film).

John Stephenson gained vast experience with supervising puppetry, CG animation, creature-effects, animatronics and visual effects which span a wide range of stories and styles that include Return to Oz, The Flintstones (film), The Neverending Story III, Babe (film), Loch Ness (film), The English Patient (film) and Lost in Space (film).

With his experience, he got on to launch his directing career, applying his hand to both commercials and feature films involving creature-effects, helming the Hallmark/Creature Shop co-production of Animal Farm and his background that has shaped his directing style into what it is today.

In 2000, John was awarded an OBE in the Queen's Millennium 2000 New Year Honours list for services to computer animation industry as a designer for the Millennium Project. His film Animal Farm (1999 film) was also nominated for best film in the 2000s Fantasporto International Fantasy Film Award and nominated for the Starboy Award in the 2000s Oulu International Children's and Youth Film Festival.

In 2001, John worked as Animation Director for the French historical action horror film Brotherhood of the Wolf which involved creating special effects for the creature are a combination of computer generated imagery, as well as puppetry and animatronics.

Stephenson directed the film adaptation of the novel Five Children and It in 2004, which features live action and computer animation. Additionally, in 2013 Stephenson directed the film adaptation of Max Lucado's novel The Christmas Candle (novel) which was distributed by EchoLight Studios in the US and by Pinewood Pictures in the UK.

In 2014, John Stephenson developed, co-wrote and directed Interlude in Prague which was shot entirely on location in the Czech Republic. In November 2017, the film won a Golden Angel Award for the Best International Co-Production Film at the Chinese American Film Festival.

In February 2019, John directed a short film for the British electronic music group Hybrid starring James Purefoy who he worked with on his film Interlude in Prague the year before.

In June 2020, Deadline Hollywood reported that Stephenson was directing the epic historical drama feature film The Lady of Heaven with Enlightened Kingdom production company.

== Filmography ==
Year	Title	Notes
1996	The Adventures of Pinocchio	Second Unit Director
1998	Lost in Space	Second Unit Director
1999	Animal Farm	Director
2001	Brotherhood of the Wolf	Animation Director
2004	Five Children and It	Director
2010	The Nutcracker in 3D	Second Unit Director
2013	The Christmas Candle	Director
2017	Interlude in Prague	Director
2021	The Lady of Heaven	Creative Consultant

=== Commercials ===
- Flymo "Rake"
- Legoland "Fire"
- Lemsip "Day & Night"
- Coral (bookmaker) "Hot Air"
- McDonald's "Monopoly"
- Comfort (fabric softener) "A Day In The Life"

=== Additional credits ===
Year	Title	Role
1982	The Dark Crystal	Special mechanical designer
1985	Return to Oz	Mechanical characters mechanical designer
1986	Max mon amour	Makeup special effects collaborator
1987	The Storyteller (TV series)	Special effects creative supervisor
1990	The Witches	Animatronic designer
1990	Teenage Mutant Ninja Turtles	Special effects creative supervisor
1991	Teenage Mutant Ninja Turtles II	Special effects creative supervisor
1991	The Storyteller: Greek Myths (TV Mini-Series)	Special effects creative supervisor
1992	The Muppet Christmas Carol	Special effects creative supervisor
1994	The Flintstones	Special effects supervisor
1994	The NeverEnding Story III	Special effects creative supervisor
1995	Babe	Special effects creature shop supervisor
1996	Loch Ness	Special effects creative supervisor
1996	James and the Giant Peach	Animatronic puppeteer
1996	The English Patient	Special effects visual supervisor
1996	101 Dalmatians	Special effects creature shop supervisor
1997	The Odyssey	Special effects creative supervisor
1997	Buddy	Special effects supervisor
1998	Lost in Space	Special effects creature shop supervisor
2019	Hold Your Breath (video short)	Director

== Awards and nominations ==
Year	Award	Category	Film	Result
1987	British Academy of Film and Television Arts	Best Special Visual Effects	Dreamchild	Nominated
1991	Academy of Motion Picture Arts and Sciences	Scientific and Engineering Award	N/A	Won
1991	Academy of Science Fiction, Fantasy and Horror Films	Saturn Award for Best Make-up	The Witches (1990 film)	Nominated
2000	Queen's Millennium 2000 New Year Honours	OBE	N/A	Won
2000	Fantasporto International Fantasy Film Award	Best Film	Animal Farm (1999 film)	Nominated
2000	Oulu International Children's and Youth Film Festival	Starboy Award	Animal Farm (1999 film)	Nominated
2017	Chinese American Film Festival	Golden Angel Award for the Best International Co-Production Film	Interlude in Prague	Won
