= Ophelia (2018 film) =

2018 film by Claire McCarthy

- Theatrical release poster
- Directed by: Claire McCarthy
- Screenplay by: Semi Chellas
- Based on: Hamlet by William Shakespeare; Ophelia by Lisa Klein
- Produced by: Daniel Bobker; Sarah Curtis; Ehren Kruger; Paul Hanson
- Starring: Daisy Ridley; Naomi Watts; Clive Owen; George MacKay; Tom Felton; Devon Terrell
- Cinematography: Denson Baker
- Edited by: Luke Dunkley
- Music by: Steven Price
- Production companies: Covert Media; Bert Marcus Productions; Bobker / Kruger Films; Forthcoming Films; Freebury Productions
- Distributed by: IFC Films (United States); Blue Finch Film Releasing (United Kingdom)
- Release dates: January 22, 2018 (Sundance); June 28, 2019 (United States); November 22, 2019 (United Kingdom)
- Running time: 107 minutes
- Countries: United Kingdom; United States
- Language: English
- Box office: $338,940

Ophelia is a 2018 historical drama film directed by Claire McCarthy and written by Semi Chellas about the character of the same name from William Shakespeare's play Hamlet. Based on the 2006 novel by Lisa Klein, the film follows the story of Hamlet from Ophelia's perspective. It stars Daisy Ridley in the title role, alongside Naomi Watts, Clive Owen, George MacKay, Tom Felton and Devon Terrell. The dialogue is in modern English.

The film premiered at the 2018 Sundance Film Festival, and had a limited theatrical run on June 28, 2019, followed by a VOD release on July 2, 2019 by IFC Films. Critical reception was mixed, and the film's Rotten Tomatoes' score has been accused of manipulation by paid reviewers.

== Plot ==
In the castle of Elsinore, Denmark, Ophelia is Queen Gertrude's favourite lady-in-waiting, and is ridiculed by the others for her lack of nobility. Her father, Polonius, is chief councillor to King Hamlet.

Upon his return from Wittenberg, Prince Hamlet soon begins courting Ophelia, but their romance is cut short when he returns to his studies. At the same time, Hamlet's uncle Claudius seduces Gertrude.

Later, Gertrude sends Ophelia for her tonic from the healer Mechtild deep in the forest. That night, Ophelia witnesses the king and queen in a heated argument. She pursues the distraught Gertrude up to the castle parapets where she sees an apparent ghost.

The next day the king is dead, presumably from a venomous snake bite. Claudius takes the throne as his successor and marries Gertrude. Hamlet returns to Elsinore enraged, suspecting foul play. He resumes his romance with Ophelia, which the court notices. Ophelia's brother Laertes cautions her to be careful, before leaving for France. Ophelia meets Hamlet at the parapets where he confides in her his suspicions about his mother's infidelity.

Ophelia later learns Mechtild is not only Gertrude's twin sister but also Claudius' former lover. He ruined her by accusing her of witchcraft when she miscarried their son. She escaped persecution by faking her own death with a special poison. Later on, Hamlet meets Ophelia in the chapel and they secretly marry.

Early the next morning, Ophelia discovers Claudius is the spectral figure, then finds Mechtild's poison in his cloak, and realises he poisoned King Hamlet. Upon discovering their secret marriage, Claudius tries to use her to spy on Hamlet. Ophelia warns him of the murder and he insists she hide in a convent to be safe from Claudius. Polonius deduces that Hamlet is mad, but unconvinced Claudius instructs him to marry off Ophelia.

That night, Hamlet has an acting troupe depict his father's murder. Claudius bursts into a rage, confirming Hamlet's suspicions. Gertrude blames Ophelia, dismissing her. Polonius pleads Ophelia's case with Gertrude, but he is killed by Hamlet, who mistakes him for Claudius. Horatio devastates Ophelia further, telling her that Hamlet has been banished to England with Rosencrantz and Guildenstern.

Laertes returns from France demanding justice for his father. During her wedding preparations, Ophelia learns that Claudius ordered Hamlet's murder. But Horatio lifts her hopes when he tells her he is still alive.

Attempting to escape the castle, Ophelia is cornered by Claudius so she confronts him for mistreating Mechtild. He locks her up, but she escapes and feigns madness. During her act, Ophelia tells Horatio to take her body from the grave. Claudius orders her arrest but Gertrude shows her mercy, believing her show of insanity. The guards pursue her to the lake where she drinks Mechtild's poison and seemingly drowns.

Horatio understood her request and digs her up as she wakes, but the poison has weakened her. Travelling through the forest, they find Norwegian soldiers heading to Elsinore. Horatio leaves to warn the court while Ophelia seeks out Mechtild for an antidote.

When confronted about the king's murder, Mechtild explains that while she had no part in it she admits she could not deny Claudius as she still harboured feelings for him, but agrees that he should pay for his crimes. While Ophelia rests, Mechtild goes to help the invading Norwegians.

Ophelia awakes to a stunned and remorseful Gertrude, who announces that Laertes has challenged Hamlet to a duel. Ophelia forgives her, and sneaks back into the castle unrecognised with Gertrude's help. Claudius meanwhile has anointed Laertes’ sword with poison.

Hamlet is overjoyed to see his beloved alive and well. Ophelia pleads with him to leave with her but he is still consumed by vengeance, but promises to follow her to the convent. Ophelia sadly bids him goodbye and leaves Elsinore for good. Both Hamlet and Laertes are killed, wounded by the poisoned sword. Enraged and grief-stricken, Gertrude grabs Hamlet's sword and kills Claudius, just as the Norwegians storm the castle, accompanied by Mechtild. She poisons herself with Claudius' venom and dies in her sister's arms.

The film closes with Ophelia living peacefully in exile with her daughter, fathered by Hamlet.

== Cast ==
- Daisy Ridley as Ophelia
  - Mia Quiney as Young Ophelia
- Naomi Watts as Gertrude / Mechtild
  - Anna Rust as young Mechtild
- Clive Owen as King Claudius, the uncle of Prince Hamlet
- George MacKay as Prince Hamlet
  - Jack Cunningham-Nuttall as young Hamlet
- Tom Felton as Laertes
  - Calum O'Rourke as young Laertes
- Rupesh Tillu as Yorick
- Devon Terrell as Horatio
- Nathaniel Parker as King Hamlet
- Dominic Mafham as Polonius
- Daisy Head as Christina
- Sebastian De Souza as Edmund
- Noel Czuczor as Rosencrantz
- Martin Angerbauernas as Guildenstern

== Production ==
On May 4, 2016, it was announced that Daisy Ridley and Naomi Watts would star in the drama film Ophelia based on the novel by Lisa Klein, which was in turn based on the character of same name by William Shakespeare from his play Hamlet. The film would be directed by Claire McCarthy and the script written by Semi Chellas. Covert Media would finance the film, while Daniel Bobker and Ehren Kruger would produce the film along with Sarah Curtis. Bert Marcus also executive produced the film. Massimo Cantini Parrini designed costumes for the film using the paintings of J. M. W. Turner and John William Waterhouse and costumes by Piero Tosi and Mariano Fortuny for reference.

Filming began in April 2017, with a first look image released in May. After three months, principal production wrapped on July 6, 2017. Composer Steven Price signed on to write the musical score.

== Release ==
It premiered at the Sundance Film Festival on January 22, 2018. In February 2019, IFC Films acquired the US distribution rights to the film. It was released in theaters on June 28, 2019. Blue Finch Film later acquired the UK distribution rights on August 15, 2019, a month after its US release, and released it on November 22, 2019.

== Critical reception ==
Film critic James Berardinelli wrote on Reelviews that the film "doesn’t live up to its promise perhaps because the lead character, even after having been 'expanded,' is still rather flat," that "it’s not compelling enough to represent a story that must be told, and "it suffers from a weak protagonist and a narrative that leans too heavily on the original text without finding enough new material to give it a life of its own." Writing on RogerEbert.com, critic Nell Minow noted that the film includes "well-known lines of dialogue that take on new meanings" and "settings and costumes that are grand and beautiful but very much in service to the story, sound design that literally echoes the cavernous chill of the castle contrasted with the warmth of the natural world outdoors, and dynamic camera work to underscore the shifting points of view."

On Rotten Tomatoes, the film holds an approval rating of 58% based on 125 reviews. The site's critics consensus reads: "Flawed yet intriguing, Ophelia uses Hamlet as the starting point for a noble attempt to offer a misunderstood character long-overdue agency." Metacritic surveyed 23 critics and assessed eleven reviews as positive, ten as mixed and two as negative. It gave an aggregate score of 60 out of 100, which it said indicated "mixed or average reviews". Following a campaign by publicity company Bunker 15, eight reviews, seven positive and one negative, were added to Rotten Tomatoes between October 2018 and January 2019, which changed the rating from "rotten" to "fresh". The writer of the negative review stated that Bunker 15 attempted to have them change their review, and other critics stated that the company paid them at least $50 for positive reviews. The page for Ophelia has since been removed from the filmography listings of people involved on Rotten Tomatoes.
