= Krnsko =

- Municipality
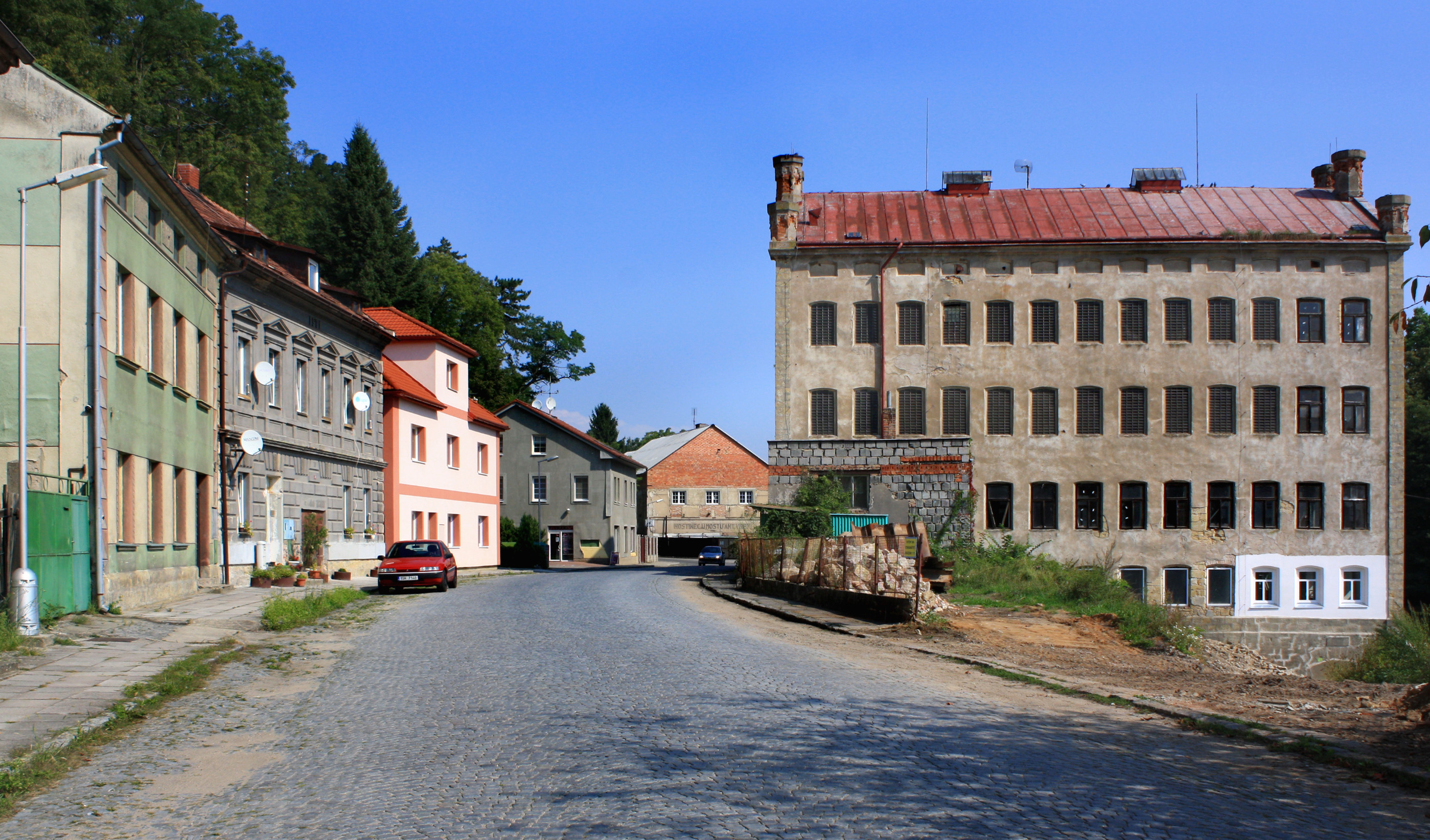
- Street in Krnsko

- Flag Coat of arms

- Location in the Czech Republic
- Coordinates: 50°22′21″N 14°51′47″E
- Country: Czech Republic
- Region: Central Bohemian
- District: Mladá Boleslav
- First mentioned: 1360

Area
  - Total: 5.62 km^{2} (2.17 sq mi)
- Elevation: 230 m (750 ft)

Population (2026-01-01)
  - Total: 592
  - Density: 105/km^{2} (273/sq mi)
- Time zone: UTC+1 (CET)
  - Summer (DST): UTC+2 (CEST)
- Postal code: 294 31
- Website: www.krnsko.cz

Krnsko is a municipality and village in Mladá Boleslav District in the Central Bohemian Region of the Czech Republic. It has about 600 inhabitants. It is located on the Jizera River.

== Administrative division ==
Krnsko consists of two municipal parts (in brackets population according to the 2021 census):

- Krnsko (483)
- Řehnice (86)

== Etymology ==
The suffix -sko indicates that the village was founded on the site of another village and took its name. Krnsko was founded on the site of the abandoned village of Krnín.

== Geography ==
Krnsko is located about 5 kilometres (3 mi) southwest of Mladá Boleslav and 38 km (24 mi) northeast of Prague. It lies in the Jizera Table. The municipality is situated on the right bank of the Jizera River.

== History ==
The first written mention of Krnsko is from 1360. Řehnice was first mentioned in 1319.

== Demographics ==
Historical population

Year	Pop.	±%
1869	628	—
1880	637	+1.4%
1890	616	−3.3%
1900	691	+12.2%
1910	739	+6.9%

Year	Pop.	±%
1921	794	+7.4%
1930	820	+3.3%
1950	690	−15.9%
1961	744	+7.8%
1970	616	−17.2%

Year	Pop.	±%
1980	537	−12.8%
1991	451	−16.0%
2001	521	+15.5%
2011	571	+9.6%
2021	569	−0.4%

Source: Censuses

== Transport ==
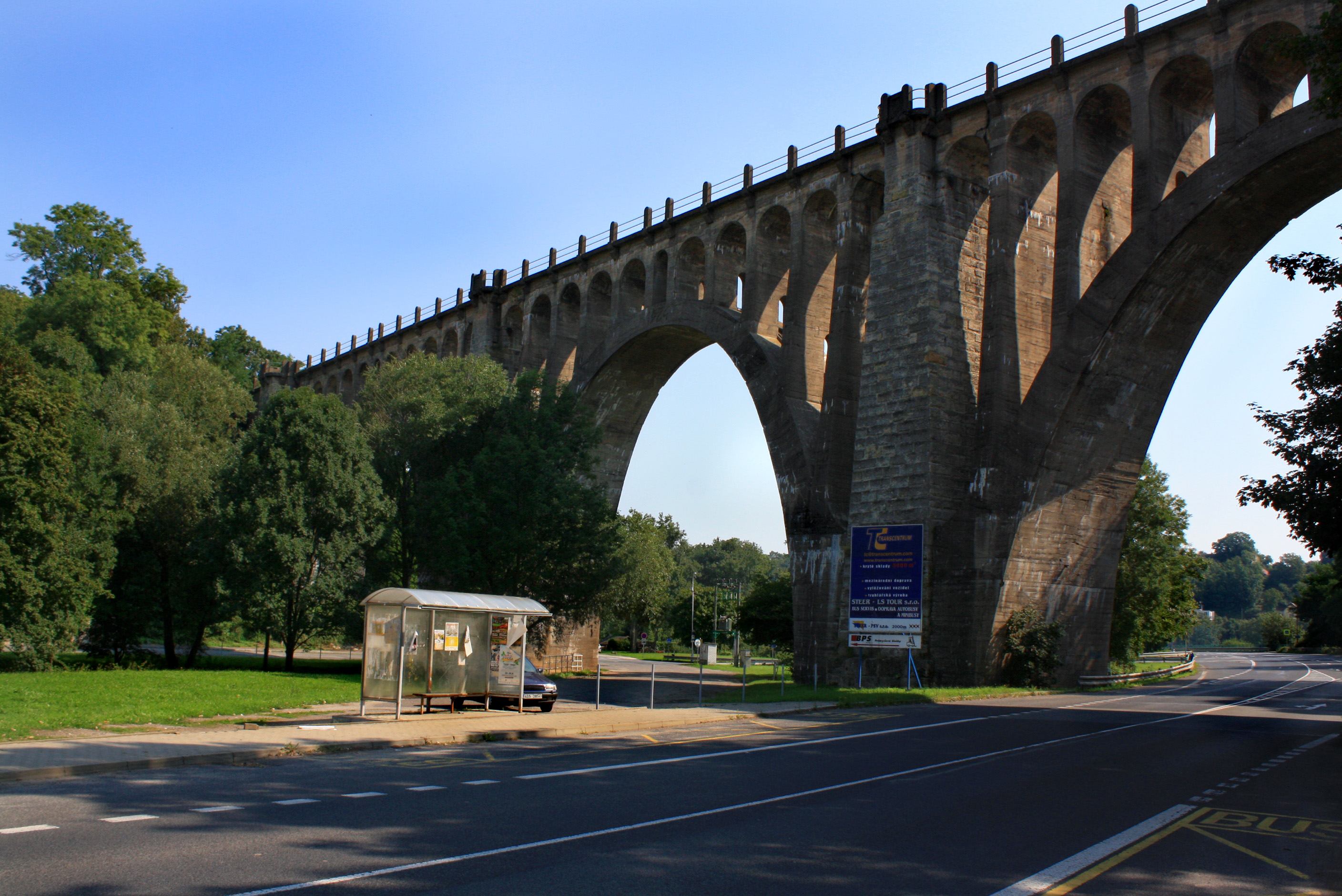
Stránovský viadukt

The I/16 road, which connects the D10 motorway with Mělník, briefly crosses the municipality.

Krnsko is located on the railway line Prague–Mladá Boleslav.

== Sights ==
The railway bridge in Krnsko called Stránovský viadukt was built in 1924 and has been protected as a technical monument. The length of the bridge is 152 m (499 ft) and the maximum height above the lowest point of the bridge is up to 27 m (89 ft).
