= The Christmas Candle =

- Official poster
- Directed by: John Stephenson
- Screenplay by: Candace Lee; Eric Newman
- Based on: The Christmas Candle by Max Lucado
- Produced by: Tom Newman; Hannah Leader; Steve Christian; Ivan Dunleavy; Huw Penallt Jones; Brian Lockhart
- Starring: Hans Matheson; Samantha Barks; Lesley Manville; Sylvester McCoy; James Cosmo; Susan Boyle; Barbara Flynn; John Hannah
- Edited by: Emma E. Hickox
- Production company: Pinewood Studios
- Distributed by: Pinewood Studios (UK); EchoLight Studios (US)
- Release dates: 25 November 2013 (United States); 13 December 2013 (United Kingdom)
- Countries: United Kingdom; United States
- Language: English
- Box office: $2.5 million

The Christmas Candle is a 2013 Christmas drama film directed by John Stephenson.

== Introduction ==
It is based on Max Lucado's novel The Christmas Candle. The film is an Impact and Big Book Media production presented by Pinewood Pictures and distributed by Rick Santorum's film production company EchoLight Studios in the US and by Pinewood Pictures in the UK. It is Susan Boyle's debut on the big screen. Boyle also contributes an original song to the film, "Miracle Hymn".

=== Locations ===
It was shot in Gloucestershire, Worcestershire and in the Isle of Man. Locations included Stanway House, Tudor House in the Worcestershire village of Broadway, and the Wiltshire village of Biddestone, including the White Horse pub. Studio work was completed on the Isle of Man in the Mountain View Media Village studios in Lezayre.

== Plot ==
In the fictional village of Gladbury, every twenty-five years an angel visits the candlemaker and bestows a miracle upon whoever lights the Christmas Candle. The whole town believes in the candle except the new pastor, Rev. David Richmond. It is 1890 and the Haddingtons make candles and the town and church use them. It is the Christmas season and the pastor preaches the Advent themes and lights a candle each Sunday. He tries to convince the town folk to believe in God and not candle miracles.

The angel appears and marks a special candle. Whoever lights that candle will receive a miracle. Mr. Haddington wants to keep the candle for himself so that their missing son will return and live in Gladbury. However, on the night that the candle is to be blessed, the magic candle is misplaced when the prepared candles are knocked over and the Christmas candle cannot be identified. Despite this, the Haddingtons pass out candles to a boy who can't talk, a woman who wants to find a husband, a blind man and twenty-six other candles to people who all have individual needs, suggesting to each that they have the Christmas candle but not saying it explicitly. The preacher wants people to pray to God and not seek hope and change in a candle.

Reverend Richmond at his own expense has the church wired with new and modern lightbulbs as a further example for folk not to rely upon candles. At a church service he has the candles extinguished and the lights turned on. It goes terribly wrong. The bulbs explode and a fire is started. A man dies in the ensuing panic. Few parishioners attend next Sunday. Christmas Eve service comes and the candle miracle is to be revealed. Many people think that they had received the blessed candle after the Haddingtons passed them out. The boy can talk, a man got a job, a woman's debts were forgiven, a man's beloved cat is saved, the woman is engaged and the blind man could see just before he died. The minister thinks God has answered their prayers.

The Christmas candle has not yet been lit. The Pastor had sent for pregnant Ruth to come to Gladbury. Her wagon has wrecked and when the candle is lighted in the attempt to find her it shines with a preternatural light and she is rescued. It turns out that the Haddington's son is the father of Ruth's child and, in that way, he does indeed return to town. Even the minister's faith in miracles is restored.

== Theology ==
The Christmas Candle makes use of the Bible and the main character, the pastor, quotes Jesus from the Gospels while focusing on the Advent season. The viewpoint of the movie is a mixture of Protestant and Roman Catholic theology, where the main character is struggling to find his lost faith.

== Cast ==
- Hans Matheson as Reverend David Richmond
- Samantha Barks as Emily Barstow
- Lesley Manville as Bea Haddington
- Sylvester McCoy as Edward Haddington
- James Cosmo as Herbert Hopewell
- Susan Boyle as Eleanor Hopewell
- Barbara Flynn as Lady Camdon
- John Hannah as William Barstow
- Jude Wright as Charlie Barstow
- Tim Barlow as Oliver Barber
- Sam Crane as Thomas Haddington

== Reception ==
On the aggregator Rotten Tomatoes, the film received 22% positive reviews based on 23 reviews with an average rating of 4.2/10. The New York Daily News described it as a "Dickens-meets-Sunday-school movie", and that it was "as artless as the setup [was] muddled". The New York Post referred to it as a "throwback, made-for-TV-style film" with a "cheesy climax". The Arizona Republic judged it as "resolutely stiff and hollow". Mark Kermode gave the film a negative review and found the film to be overly sentimental and lacking in genuine emotion. Kermode felt that the story was predictable and the performances were not strong enough to elevate the material. He also mentioned that the film’s attempt to blend a traditional Christmas story with a more modern sensibility didn’t quite work.

Rare positive reviews included The Portsmouth News, which gave the film 4 stars writing "Boyle's performance is endearing and her stunning vocal talent continues to dazzle while the gentle chemistry between Matheson and Barks complements the piece without upstaging the film's central ideas." The Los Angeles Times wrote, "Hammy histrionics of a Hallmark movie are present, but its message of community and faith shines brighter." The Dove Foundation awarded 5 Doves as a "Family-Approved" film. The film expanded from five to over 390 venues for its second week.

== See also ==
- List of Christmas films
