= The Call Up (film) =

- Film poster
- Directed by: Charles Barker
- Written by: Charles Barker
- Produced by: John Giwa-Amu; Matthew James Wilkinson
- Starring: Max Deacon; Morfydd Clark; Ali Cook
- Cinematography: John Lee
- Edited by: Tommy Boulding
- Music by: Tom Raybould
- Production companies: Red & Black Films; Stigma Films
- Distributed by: Altitude Film Distribution
- Release date: 5 April 2016 (BIFFF)
- Running time: 90 minutes
- Country: United Kingdom
- Language: English

The Call Up is a 2016 British science fiction thriller film written and directed by Charles Barker. It stars Max Deacon, Morfydd Clark, Ali Cook, Parker Sawyers, Tom Benedict Knight, Boris Ler, Douggie McMeekin, and Adriana Randall as top-ranked gamers who are invited to beta test a new first-person shooter virtual reality game. When they discover the equipment includes lethal feedback, they must win the game to survive.

The film premiered at the Brussels International Fantastic Film Festival and was released in the UK on 20 May 2016.

== Plot ==
Eight top-ranked gamers are sent an invitation to beta test a new virtual reality game with a $100,000 prize. They include Soxxx_1 (Carl), Mustang67 (Shelly), Da_Chi3f (Edward), Str8 Shoot3r (Andre), xxAtla5xx (Marco), T3rrorist#1 (Zahid), Reap3r_2000 (Adam), and Slay3rGirl (Taylor). After arriving and changing into motion capture suits, they are scanned by a machine and instructed to put on virtual reality gear. Zahid, a Bosnian Muslim who chose his username ironically, refuses to wear gear that labels him as a terrorist. After he discovers the exit is now locked, Shelly convinces him to play, saying they understand he meant the name ironically.

Once everyone puts on their helmets, a computer simulation replaces the high-tech office building they are in with a post-apocalyptic, war-torn setting. A simulated sergeant enters and explains their goal: Russian terrorists have taken over each floor of the building, and they must clear a path to the bottom, starting at the 25th floor. Although relieved the terrorists are not Muslim, Zahid expresses regret in accepting the invitation, though the others are excited. The first level, a tutorial, is easily cleared, and Andre, a former soldier, takes the lead. The players are soon alarmed, however, when Carl is wounded and says the VR suit's feedback caused him actual pain. Taylor becomes increasingly panicked and reveals she took her friend's place. Shelly promises to protect her.

Suspicious of Andre's military background, Marco accuses him of being involved in the game's design. Upset, Andre leaves the group and is shot by a terrorist who has respawned. The others find his body and realize their VR helmets have been programmed to deliver a lethal shock on their character's death. Zahid asks Carl to smash his helmet, which he can't remove. Before they can get the helmet off, the sergeant enters the room, beats Zahid, and warns against further tampering. With no other choice, the players descend to the next level.

When Zahid and Carl attempt to break a window, the sergeant again appears, breaks Zahid's leg, and warns that the next violation will result in death. Zahid, recognizing that the others can not carry him to the finish of the game, stays behind as the others continue. After the players' clear several levels, Taylor becomes separated from the others and hides in a bathroom. Forced to defend herself, she kills a terrorist solo and becomes more confident. On the 9th floor, the sergeant reveals a captive terrorist and instructs the players to torture him for information. Edward volunteers, and, after several jolts of electricity, the captive gives up a password. When Adam inputs it to a computer console, it arms a bomb in the basement and starts a 30-minute countdown. Marco becomes aggressive toward Adam, whom he blames for making their situation worse.

Marco and Adam descend further while Shelly, Carl, Edward, and Taylor continue clearing an upper level. Marco uses Adam as bait for the terrorists, leaving Adam to die when he is shot. When the others reach his position, Marco kills Taylor to take a medical kit from her. Seeing "Atlas" written in Taylor's blood, Carl attacks Marco and damages his helmet, causing the sergeant to walk in and kill Marco.

Carl, Shelly, and Edward descend to the basement floor. After taking out 4 terrorists, one of the terrorists (the game's boss) with a bipod-mounted machine gun shoots both Carl and Shelly. Carl sacrifices himself to save Shelly by using the group's last medical kit on her; she holds his hand as his helmet kills him. As that happens, Edward takes out the machine gunner with a rocket launcher and stops the countdown just before it goes off. Shelly watches Edward recite the Sergeant's victory speech, and realizes he knows it by heart, meaning he must be the inside guy. The graphics lift and security guards enter the room, tranquilizing Shelly. She wakes up earlier than expected to see the others being body-bagged, and Edward tells her that she's won, giving her a large bag full of money. When Shelly threatens to reveal Edward's involvement in the murders, he says nobody will believe her. Shelly instead injects the guard with the tranquilizer and grabs his pistol, killing the remaining guards in a firefight before confronting Edward. Edward attempts to offer her more money, but she is insistent that this must never happen again, she then shoots him at point-blank range and leaves without the money.

== Cast ==
- Max Deacon as Carl (Soxx_1)
- Morfydd Clark as Shelly (Mustang67)
- Ali Cook as Edward (Da_Chief)
- Parker Sawyers as Andre (Str8_Shoot3r)
- Tom Benedict Knight as Marco (xxAtla5xx)
- Boris Ler as Zahid (T3rrorist#1)
- Douggie McMeekin as Adam (Reap3r_2000)
- Adriana Randall as Taylor (SlayerGirl)
- Chris Obi as the sergeant

== Production ==
Writer-director Charles Barker was influenced by first-person shooter video games, such as Call of Duty and Medal of Honor, but said the concept came from "the idea of being trapped in a helmet you couldn't get off". Barker wanted to explore what would happen when gamers were put into a real-life combat situation, which had been previously explored by the anime Sword Art Online. Shooting took place in Birmingham over the course of six weeks.

== Release ==
The Call Up premiered at the Brussels International Fantastic Film Festival on 5 April 2016. The UK premiere was at Sci-Fi-London on 6 May 2016. On 20 May 2016, Altitude Film Distribution released it theatrically in the UK, where it grossed $2,920.

== Reception ==
Mike McCahill of The Guardian rated it 3/5 stars and wrote, "This lowish-budget British film about gamers playing a VR shoot 'em up gone wrong is a modest update on all those killer-website movies in the noughties." Fred McNamara of Starburst rated it 7/10 stars and wrote that the film's impressive visuals, atmosphere, and action sequences make up for its clichéd characters. Matt Looker of Total Film rated it 4/5 stars and wrote, "Filled with action, intrigue and snazzy visuals, writer/director Charles Barker’s first feature impresses, even if the concept is hard to swallow." Katherine McLaughlin of SciFiNow rated it 2/5 stars and wrote, "There’s little sense of fun and that’s a real shame because it could have used it."
