= Carnival Row =

2019 American fantasy television series

- Genre: Crime drama; Neo-noir; Political; Steampunk; Urban fantasy
- Created by: René Echevarria; Travis Beacham
- Based on: A Killing on Carnival Row by Travis Beacham
- Starring: Orlando Bloom; Cara Delevingne; Simon McBurney; Tamzin Merchant; David Gyasi; Andrew Gower; Karla Crome; Arty Froushan; Indira Varma; Jared Harris; Caroline Ford; Jay Ali; Joanne Whalley; Jamie Harris; Ariyon Bakare
- Composer: Nathan Barr
- Country of origin: United States
- Original language: English
- No. of seasons: 2
- No. of episodes: 18

Production
- Executive producers: René Echevarria; Travis Beacham; Marc Guggenheim; Jon Amiel; Orlando Bloom; Cara Delevingne
- Producer: Gideon Amir
- Production location: Czech Republic
- Editor: Geofrey Hildrew
- Camera setup: Multiple-camera
- Running time: 50–67 minutes
- Production companies: Siesta Productions (season 1); CrimeThink (season 2); Legendary Television; Amazon Studios

Original release
- Network: Amazon Prime Video
- Release: August 30, 2019 – March 17, 2023

Carnival Row is an American fantasy television series created by René Echevarria and Travis Beacham, based on Beacham's unproduced film spec script, A Killing on Carnival Row. Starring Orlando Bloom and Cara Delevingne, the series follows mythological beings who must survive as oppressed refugees in human society, as a detective works to solve murders connected with them.

Carnival Row's first season was released in its entirety on Amazon Prime Video on August 30, 2019. In July 2019, Amazon renewed the series for a second season, which premiered on February 17, 2023, and served as the series's final season, concluding on March 17, 2023.

== Premise ==
In Carnival Row, "mythical creatures... have fled their war-torn homeland and gathered in the city as tensions are simmering between citizens and the growing immigrant population". There is an investigation into a string of unsolved murders, questions of madness of power, unresolved love, and social adjustments eating away at whatever uneasy peace exists.

== Cast and characters ==
=== Main ===
- Orlando Bloom as Rycroft "Philo" Philostrate, an inspector of the Burgue Constabulary, investigating a dark conspiracy at the heart of the city. A half-fae passing as a human, and veteran of the war, he sympathizes with the fae to the disgust of many of his colleagues.
- Cara Delevingne as Vignette Stonemoss, a faerie and Philo's former lover who believed him to be dead following the war. She falls in with a group of fae extremists known as the Black Raven while dealing with her complicated feelings for Philo.
- Simon McBurney as Runyan Millworthy, a human street performer and master of a troupe of kobolds.
- Tamzin Merchant as Imogen Spurnrose, a spoiled heiress who has to face reality.
- David Gyasi as Agreus Astrayon, a wealthy faun shunned by Burgue high society for his appearance and origin.
- Andrew Gower as Ezra Spurnrose, Imogen's brother whom she blames for mishandling the family finances and driving them into debt.
- Karla Crome as Tourmaline Larou, Vignette's fae friend and former lover, Poet Laureate of Tirnanoc, and a courtesan at the Tetterby Hotel in Carnival Row.
- Arty Froushan as Jonah Breakspear, the Chancellor's son who rebels against his controlling father.
- Indira Varma as Lady Piety Breakspear (season 1), the Chanchellor's manipulative wife who seeks to enshrine her family's legacy.
- Jared Harris as Chancellor Absalom Breakspear (season 1), the chancellor of the Republic of the Burgue.
- Caroline Ford as Sophie Longerbane, (Note: Ford is first credited in the fourth episode of the first season.) the power-seeking daughter of the Leader of the Opposition.
- Jay Ali as Kaine (season 2), a faerie allied with the Black Raven who goes to extreme measures to make life better for his people.
- Joanne Whalley as Leonora (season 2), a faun with a broken horn who leads the New Dawn revolutionary movement.
- Jamie Harris as Sergeant Dombey (season 2; (Note: Harris is first credited amongst the main cast in the sixth episode of the second season.) recurring season 1), a sergeant in the Constabulary who is known to harbor racist beliefs against the fae and despises Philo for sympathizing with them.
- Ariyon Bakare as Darius Sykes (season 2; (Note: Ariyon Bakare is first credited amongst the main cast in the sixth episode of the second season.) recurring season 1), Philo's old friend and a former soldier of the Burgue now held in captive luxury at Bleakness Keep due to having been bitten by a Marrok (a type of werewolf created from a virus) during the war.

=== Recurring ===
- Alice Krige as Aoife Tsigani, a Haruspex (or witch) in the service of Piety Breakspear.
- Tracey Wilkinson as Afissa, the faun housekeeper of the Spurnroses.
- Ryan Hayes as Constable Thatch, a constable with a strong hatred of the fae.
- Waj Ali as Constable Berwick, Philo's timid partner who nevertheless remains loyal to him.
- James Beaumont as Constable Cuppins, a constable who finds Philo's interest in the fae unnatural.
- Jim High as Fergus, a human servant working for Agreus.
- Scott Reid as Quilliam "Quill", a faun footman for the Breakspear family who is unjustly dismissed by the Chancellor and turns to radicalism.
- Brian Caspe as Nigel Winetrout, a politician and close advisor to the Breakspear family.
- Chloe Pirrie as Dahlia, the ruthless leader of the extremist faerie organization called the Black Raven.
- Anthony Kaye as Bolero, second-in-command of the Black Raven.
- Sinead Phelps as Jenila, Sophie Longerbane's faun lady's maid.

==== Season 1 ====
- Maeve Dermody as Portia Fyfe, Philo's landlady whose romantic advances he rebuffs.
- Leanne Best as Madame Moira, the proprietor of the Tetterby Hotel, a brothel.
- Anna Rust as Fleury, a courtesan at the Tetterby Hotel.
- Ronan Vibert as Ritter Longerbane, the Leader of the Opposition in parliament and, therefore, Chancellor Breakspear's primary political opponent. A longtime advocate of fae subjugation.
- Mark Lewis Jones as Magistrate Flute, Philo's superior in the Constabulary.
- Erika Starkova as Aisling Querelle, Philo's mother and a once-famous singer.
- Theo Barklem-Biggs as Cabal, a faun malcontent seeking to bring his brethren together.

==== Season 2 ====
- Fraser James as Erasmus Fletcher, a politician and advisor to the Longerbane family.
- Eve Ponsonby as Phaedra, a vigilante and member of the Black Raven.
- Stewart Scudamore as Boz Ghaidos, a well-connected cattle-horned faun who manages an underground fighting ring.
- Andrew Buchan as Mikulas Vir, a major in the Pact army who travels to The Burgue to secure a weapons deal with a secret of his own.
- Karel Dobrý as Ambassador Anrep, the ambassador for The Pact to The Burgue.
- Jacqueline Boatswain as Mima Blodwen, a "Mima" or spiritual leader, who guides Tourmaline.
- George Georgiou as Kastor, a high-ranking member of the New Dawn in charge of overseeing Agreus and Imogen.

== Episodes ==
Season	Episodes	Originally released	
Season	Episodes	First released	Last released
1	8	August 30, 2019	
2	10	February 17, 2023	March 17, 2023

=== Season 1 (2019) ===
No. overall	No. in season	Title	Directed by	Written by	Original release date
1	1	"Some Dark God Wakes"	Thor Freudenthal	Story by : René Echevarria and Travis Beacham; Teleplay by : René Echevarria	August 30, 2019
Vignette Stonemoss escapes Pact soldiers onto a ship with other fae-folk she has helped flee Pact-occupied fae land. A storm at sea leaves Vignette the sole survivor. The ship belonged to Ezra Spurnrose, who lives with his sister Imogen in one of the Burgue’s richer neighborhoods. Having lost a significant profit in the shipwreck, he expects the indentured Vignette to work as a lady's maid to Imogen. Vignette goes to Carnival Row on an errand, meeting her old friend Tourmaline, now a prostitute, who reveals Vignette's lover Philo is still alive. Now a police inspector investigating violent attacks on fae-folk, Philo realizes the suspect is a sailor. He tries to catch the assailant, but the man, before taking his own life, warns him that a "dark god" has awakened under the city. Vignette tells Philo that she knows he is alive. Imogen and Ezra are shocked to learn their new neighbor is a faun named Agreus. Absalom Breakspear, Chancellor of the city, faces strong opposition from his rival Longerbane. He and his wife Piety discuss their son Jonah, whom he warns not to visit Carnival Row.
2	2	"Aisling"	Thor Freudenthal	René Echevarria	August 30, 2019
A female fae named Aisling is murdered near the sewers. Philo learns Aisling was a singer turned scavenger, and asks a fae butcher to perform an autopsy, allowing a fae priestess to perform last rites. Imogen meets Agreus, rebuffing his advances. A drunk Ezra attempts to rape Vignette and she assaults him in self-defense; Ezra files a police complaint accusing her of stealing. Philo overhears this and buys Vignette's contract from him. Ezra tells Imogen they are financially unstable, and he plans to give the house as collateral to the bank to procure another ship. Imogen has her own plans, and writes to Agreus, reciprocating his interest. Vignette joins the Black Raven, a rebel fae group dealing in contraband, and is tasked to steal a flag from inside police headquarters. She succeeds by blackmailing Philo into letting her escape. Philo meets Darius, an old army friend currently in prison. Jonah is kidnapped while visiting Tourmaline. Without a ransom demand, Piety suggests they consult a witch, who sacrifices Absalom's pet bear, Barry, and tells him Longerbane kidnapped his son. It is revealed Piety is behind the kidnapping, asking the witch, her family's loyal servant, to lie.
3	3	"Kingdoms of the Moon"	Anna Foerster	Travis Beacham	August 30, 2019
A flashback reveals Philo and Darius were soldiers with the Burguish army, occupying a fae village near a telegraph line. Sent to investigate whether the faefolk are a threat, Philo finds a library guarded by Vignette, who threatens him to stay silent and is ordered to keep a close eye on him by Mima. Vignette helps the Burguishmen fix the telegraph line across a ravine, where they are attacked by Pact soldiers who morph into Marroks (a type of wolf-man) using injections. Darius is bitten, turning into a Marrok which Philo promises to keep secret. Tourmaline and other fae seek refuge at the village when their home is attacked by the Pact. Tourmaline talks to Vignette, her past lover, asking what Vignette’s plans are with Philo after the war. Vignette confronts Philo about their future, and he reveals he is a half-blood orphan who had his wings cut off as a child to pass as a man. News arrives that the Burgue has ordered its troops home. The Pact attacks the village, and Philo asks Mima to tell Vignette he is dead, to protect her. In the present, Vignette tells Philo she will keep his secret, but their love is finished.
4	4	"The Joining of Unlike Things"	Thor Freudenthal; Anna Foerster	Travis Beacham & Marc Guggenheim and Peter Cameron	August 30, 2019
Finch, headmaster of Philo's former orphanage and his foster father, is murdered. Philo encounters the killer in the sewers after finding that it left the footprints of a faun and a trow. The priestess explains to Philo that the creature may be a Darkasher, a golem reanimated from various corpses with dark magic. To prove this theory, Philo asks the witch to create a Darkasher bonded to him, which requires her to sexually assault him in Vignette’s form to collect his seed. Distraught, Absalom agrees with Piety to take Longerbane into custody until he confesses to kidnapping their son. Agreus agrees to support Imogen if she helps him gain acceptance from her peers. Suspecting Vignette is an informant, Dahlia orders her to find the real informant or die. Tourmaline forces Philo to reveal the informant is Hamlyn, who tells Philo that a deceased member of the Black Raven named Wren was hired to dig up several bodies. Finding Longerbane on the brink of death, Piety poisons him, telling Absalom where to find Jonah. Vignette attacks Hamlyn, but he overpowers her and Philo shoots him dead. Dahlia promotes Vignette in Hamlyn's place after bringing her his wing. Jonah is returned to Absalom, but recognizes the sound of Piety's heels from captivity. Philo takes his landlady Portia on a date.
5	5	"Grieve No More"	Andy Goddard	Ian Deitchman and Kristin Robinson	August 30, 2019
As the Darkasher cannot be killed while its master lives, Philo searches for its creator. Over Ezra's objections, Imogen invites Agreus to a tea party with her friends, which proves humiliating when he insists on being treated as their equal. As Agreus prepares to leave, Ezra swallows his pride and permits him to stay. Afterward, Agreus gives him a check. Philo returns to the orphanage, revisiting painful memories, and meets with the assistant headmaster who reveals that Finch regularly traveled to the Tetterby for companionship. Longerbane's ambitious daughter Sophie assumes his office and declares her opposition to coexistence with the fae. Enthralled by her, Jonah grows distant from his family. Runyon's kobold performers are seized by the police and deported as unregistered pets. Philo learns the truth from Madame Moira: Finch was in a secret relationship with police coroner Morange who confesses that Finch knew Aisling in his younger days, leading Philo to deduce Aisling was his mother. That night, Morange is murdered in his home by the Darkasher. Jonah's former footman Quill joins a secret society of "Pucks" after their leader Cabal gives him a book to read.
6	6	"Unaccompanied Fae"	Andy Goddard	Stephanie K. Smith	August 30, 2019
Philo's fellow police officers become suspicious as he seems to be making no progress on his case. Jonah meets Sophie and learns she abhors her father's politics, but cannot afford to alienate his supporters. She tells him they are very much alike, but he is still under his parents' thumb. Philo tells Portia he is a half-blood and she ends their relationship and kicks him out. Vignette discovers her library is on display at a Burguish museum. Enraged, she accosts the patrons and is arrested for trespassing. During a procession, Quill witnesses a fellow Puck being beaten by an abusive foreman which Cabal offers as proof humans will never accept the Fae. Imogen accompanies Agreus to a charity auction where he impresses her with his wit and humiliates a haughty couple who insult her. Constable Dombey forces Portia to reveal Philo's secret. Berwick tries to explain Philo's theory about the Darkasher, which Dombey and the Magistrate are convinced Philo made up to disguise the killings. Runyon tells Philo that the late Mr. Spurnrose, an admirer of Aisling, let her stay at his house to give birth safely. Philo is taken into police custody.
7	7	"The World to Come"	Jon Amiel	Story by : René Echevarria; Teleplay by : Peter Cameron	August 30, 2019
Dombey hopes Philo will be killed by human prisoners. Vignette warns him and he fights them off. The witch warns Piety that she will die soon and that the police have the wrong man. Guilt-stricken, Portia tells the police she lied about Philo. The Magistrate offers to free Philo if he swears he is a man, but Philo admits he is half-fae. Dombey plots to have Philo murdered before trial. Hired as Jonah’s tutor, Runyon lambasts him for his lack of purpose, driving Jonah to accept Sophie’s offer to force his father from power. Furious to learn his father sheltered Aisling, Ezra tells Imogen that Agreus will cast her aside. She visits Agreus where they confess their mutual feelings and have sex. Cabal inducts Quill into his society by having him kill the foreman. Philo and Vignette reconcile and realize the killer is Philo's father who wants to rid himself of his half-blood son and has been killing those close to him to learn his identity. Philo is removed from his cell by Dombey, having been warned by Berwick of his plans. Instead of being killed, Philo is taken to a rural estate to meet his biological father: Absalom.
8	8	"The Gloaming"	Jon Amiel	Travis Beacham	August 30, 2019
Absalom prepares to kill Philo until Philo convinces him that he did not kill Aisling. Swapping stories, Absalom promises to free Vignette, but a disguised Quill stabs him in his office. Piety reveals to Jonah that Sophie is his half-sister from her affair with Ritter and Jonah realizes his father always suspected he was not his biological son. Catching Agreus and Imogen sleeping together, Ezra tries to shoot Agreus who strikes him. Piety smothers her husband and inspects his liver, learning of Vignette's existence. The witch is killed, warning Philo that Vignette is in danger. Piety is revealed to be the master of the Darkasher and sends it to kill Philo, but Vignette frees herself and stabs Piety with a pair of shears, killing her and her monster. As his mother's body has not been found, Jonah assumes the role of acting chancellor with Runyon as his chief advisor and deduces Sophie was responsible for the blackmails by convincing Piety that Philo, not him, was destined for greatness. Nevertheless, Jonah forms an alliance with Sophie. Agreus and Imogen take Agreus' ship to find a new home. In light of the uprisings, Jonah establishes a ghetto for the Fae, forbidding them to leave the Burgue or interact with humans. Fleury is shot for trying to fly away from the Tetterby Hotel. Embracing his fae heritage, Philo joins Vignette and the other fae in the ghetto.

=== Season 2 (2023) ===
No. overall	No. in season	Title	Directed by	Written by	Original release date
9	1	"Fight or Flight"	Thor Freudenthal	Story by : Erik Oleson and Travis Beacham & Marc Guggenheim; Teleplay by : Erik Oleson	February 17, 2023
After the events of Season 1, Philo earns money in an underground fighting ring while Vignette is robbing a train with members of the Black Raven. Philo reminds the ringmaster Boz Ghaidos of their deal. Vignette brings the spoils of their robbery, a substance called Anodyne, to an infirmary to ease the symptoms of Bás Dubh, an illness that befalls Pixies. Mr. Millworthy tries and fails to get Jonah Breakspear to visit the Row. Sophie Longerbane overhears her party members plotting to soon overthrow her and she tries to prop Jonah up to secure their seats, but Jonah has doubts. Mr. Millworthy visits the Row himself and talks to Philo who expresses a desire to take the chancellor's seat for himself. Together they plot to publicize Philo's pedigree at the state banquet the day after. Tourmaline visits the workshop of the old Haruspex and has a vision. Vignette is initiated into The Black Raven, but is threatened by Dahlia. After meeting with Vignette, Tourmaline has another vision of the old Haruspex. Philo is suddenly escorted out of the row by the army and brought to a crime scene by Constable Berwick. Berwick accuses the Black Raven of killing a police officer and wants Philo's help but is interrupted by Dombey who commands that Philo be put back in the Row. Imogen and Agreus' ship is suddenly approached by a Pact airship.
10	2	"New Dawn"	Thor Freudenthal	Sarah Byrd	February 17, 2023
Imogen and Agreus are forced by the Pact to make port at Ragusa. Imogene is taken into the city and is surprised by what she finds while Agreus is arrested as a class traitor. Philo and Vignette argue over next steps. An ambassador from the Pact named Anrep negotiates with Jonah to purchase rifles and gunpowder to fight the New Dawn. Secretly, Jonah and Sophie plot to arm both the Pact and the New Dawn in order to retain their seats and reclaim Tirnanoc. Sophie sneaks into a storage room and reunites with Jenila, a faun servant she is hiding. They discuss finances, Jenila's brother, and a secret plan. Philo's reward from the fight in the first episode is releasing Darius who recounts his experience in captivity and how the people in his prison found out about his Marrok condition. Tourmaline continues to have visions and discovers Aoife Tsigani passed her the sight when she died. Imogen and Agreus are reunited as she tells him she met with Leonora, a faun with a broken horn. Philo sneaks into the Chancellor's dinner with assistance from Millworthy. As he is about to make his claim, members of the Black Raven break in through the ceiling. Millworthy and Philo are caught exchanging a look by Ambassador Anrep as everyone flees.
11	3	"The Martyr's Hand"	Wendey Stanzler	Wesley Strick	February 24, 2023
Tourmaline continues to have visions. The Heads and wings of Black Ravens appear on the wall, but the police refuses to investigate. Millworthy asks Philo to wait. With the chancellor humiliated, he may topple from power without Philo having to reveal himself. Millworthy has a plan, but doesn't want Philo involved. Sophie visits the Row in a well received publicity stunt. Tourmaline confides in Philo about her visions. Millworthy meets with Major Vir offering arms to fight the New Dawn, but Vir is suspicious. Philo intends to investigate the deaths and blackmails Boz Ghaidos to get a message to Berwick. Sophie proposes to reopen Carnival Row with restrictions, to put workers back in the factories. The Chancellor is warned that Sophie is only proposing so because she has been buying up factories. Philo and Berwick take Tourmaline to find the Black Raven's bodies, using one to help Tourmaline have another vision, hoping to find their killer. But Tourmaline instead sees her own death. She returns to the house of the Haruspex and finds Darius where Philo hid him. Ezra persuades Agreus' man Fergus for information on his and Imogen's whereabouts, then kills him. The Black Ravens plan to attack the police, Philo tries to talk them out of it, and Vignette forces him to make a choice.
12	4	"An Unkindness of Ravens"	Wendey Stanzler	Dylan Gallagher & Mateja Božičević	February 24, 2023
Agreus and Imogen are expected to do factory work in Ragusa, a shock to both of them. After work, Leonora asks for Imogen. Leonora urges Imogen to embrace her new life with Agreus, but she warns her that if Agreus continues to be stubborn, they will both suffer. Later, Ezra comes to Leonora with a report the Pact is buying Burgish rifles to use against New Dawn. Philo and Darius go to Dombey's home to warn him of the Black Raven's attempt on his life, and to get his help finding the Raven leader's killer. The Ravens come and Philo tries to talk them down while Darius and Dombey escape out the back door. During the chase, Darius gets hit with a blow dart and transforms. Philo keeps Dombey from shooting Vignette. They escape through the sewers. Vignette calls off the attack, and Philo is arrested. Dombey has Berwick escort Philo back to the Row. Tourmaline goes to a Mima for help with her visions. She's given a recipe to "Purge the darkness". As she reads it, a marrok attacks, then goes to the back room and transforms back into Darius. Philo and Vignette try to convince each other to run, but both refuse. They decide to stop their relationship. The police raid the Row looking for Ravens. Vignette goes to warn them while Philo protects the civilian fae. Vignette turns herself in to stop the violence.
13	5	"Reckoning"	Julian Holmes	Tania Lotia	March 3, 2023
Philo returns home after the raid where he is attacked by Kaine, a Raven. Philo fends him off, then recruits him to save Vignette who is sentenced to die. Jonah is shown evidence that Sophie owns a considerable stake in the armament factories. She falls under suspicion of intending to buy parliament seats and make herself chancellor. Now the richest person in the Burgue, Sophie has orchestrated some of the fae to be allowed to leave the Row and work in her factories, helping her maid find her brother in the process. Major Vir remains suspicious of Millworthy. Tourmaline uses her sight to make sure Vignette will be alright, against Darius' warnings. Jonah attempts to accept Sophie's earlier marriage proposal, but Sophie demurs until after the next election. Sophie is arrested for treason by Jonah. Tourmaline tells Philo and Kaine that Vignette will be killed that night instead of after her trial. They plan to break her out of the fortress that night. Sophie is taken to the same fortress and jailed across from Vignette. Jonah also has Millworthy arrested. Philo and Kaine attempt to enter the fortress and find Vignette. Jonah tries to have Sophie sign a confession, but she refuses. He has her, Millworthy, and Vignette taken to the guillotine. Sophie is executed. Before Vignette can be killed, a grotesque creature appears and slaughters the guards and Jonah. Philo and the Raven rush in during the ensuing breakout to find Millworthy in shock and Vignette gone. The creature escapes and they are arrested.
14	6	"Original Sins"	Julian Holmes	Jim Dunn	March 3, 2023
During the anniversary of the revolution, Imogen and Agreus plan to escape. Agreus is taken to see Leonora who has taken Ezra captive. Agreus spares him and Ezra becomes his and Imogen's responsibility. During the war, Philo remembers seeing a creature like what had attacked the fortress. It shapeshifts into a human, sparing him due to being part pix. It is identified as a Sparas, a type of monster believed to have died out centuries ago. Philo is ordered to burn their valley to stop the Pact advance. In the present, Philo is interrogated in prison while Vignette hides with Tourmaline during the police raid on the Row. Philo questions his decisions. Tourmaline believes the Sparas is coming to kill her, but refuses to run away with Vignette. Millworthy is cleared of all charges, but is asked to be part of the interim government. After Major Vir informs him of growing anti-fae sentiment, he accepts. Berwick guesses that the Sparas is behind the killings to exacerbate the hate between the fae and humans. The Black Ravens come to get Vignette, but she wants to be done with them. She returns to Tourmaline. Dombey comes to take Philo out of prison as long as he helps them catch the Sparas.
15	7	"Kindred"	Andy Goddard	Sam Ernst	March 10, 2023
During the festivities in Ragusa, Imogen and Agreus plan to escape only to have the Pact attack. Vignette goes to Boz to buy passage out of the Burgue for herself and Tourmaline, but he's more interested in the price on her head. They escape and hear that the Pact pulled its armies out of Tirnanoc to fight the New Dawn. Loathing himself for having to hide being half-fae, Philo goes to get drunk and is nearly robbed until Darius saves him. Philo asks Dombey to see Millworthy. He gets Millworthy to arrange for passage for the fae to go to Tirnanoc. Tourmaline invites Darius to come with the fae, but he refuses. Vignette disguises herself as a puck nurse to get on a ship. She meets Philo and wants him to come to Tirnanoc with the rest of the fae. The fae are harassed by humans to the ships. Berwick can't believe Philo is leaving. Black Ravens attack and burn the ships. Then the Sparas appears, killing all human guards. Pix try to fly away, causing guards to shoot them down, frightening the rest of the fae into a stampede. The Sparas kills Berwick.
16	8	"Facta Non Verba"	Andy Goddard	Jim Dunn & Sam Ernst & Erik Oleson	March 10, 2023
Philo goes to track down the Sparas. In Ragusa, the real Agreus, Imogen, and Ezra try to survive the Pact attack where they managed to kill a soldier that turned into a Marrok. They head inland away from the battle. Ezra tries to get between Agreus and Imogen, then pulls a gun on them when a Pact patrol rides by. Agreus holds him down and Imogen holds his mouth and nose, suffocating him. Imogen, tired of being controlled, chooses freedom and even over Agreus' love if need be. Later that night, Agreus and Imogen are found by Kastor and the New Dawn and brought to a mass grave. They are told to put Ezra's body into it. Leonora says the Pact has been driven back and wants to send them back to the Burgue along with Kastor as emissaries. She wants terms for peace between the Burgue and the New Dawn. Millworthy arranges for her to speak to parliament. Agreus and Imogen remain cold to each other. Philo tells Dombey the Sparas is male. They find Burgish marines that were hiding in the ships floating in on the tide: They were planning to retake Tirnanoc. Vignette arranges to meet with the Black Ravens. She gets knocked out and taken by the Ravens. Kaine explains to her about the troops hiding in the ships. Millworthy admits to Philo the only way he could convince the military to take the fae home was that they were going there anyway to take back the old colonies in Tirnanoc. With the Pact on the point of surrendering, the Black Ravens and Boz Ghiados' group have allied with the New Dawn to bring revolution to the Burgue. Leonora wants Vignette to lead the Black Ravens.
17	9	"Battle Lines"	Julian Holmes	Amanda Krader & Tania Lotia	March 17, 2023
The Haruspex traps Tourmaline in a mirror and gives her more power. Philo plans to trap and kill the Sparas using Tourmaline to magically draw it to her. Leonora convinces Vignette to lead the Black Ravens. With more attacks on the way, Imogen refuses to negotiate for the New Dawn in parliament. Philo goes to Dombey for a machine gun to kill the Sparas. Imogen and Agreus convince Kastor to send a message to the New Dawn. Agreus must take it since humans are not allowed on the Row. Philo takes a Sparas tooth that Tourmaline needs from Berwick's body. Before he leaves, Agreus and Imogen repair their relationship. Vignette escorts Agreus to the New Dawn and Leonora realizes Kastor sent not a message, but a warning about Agreus and Imogen. Millworthy convinces parliament members not to burn the Row and start a war with the fae. The Black Ravens plan an attack. Philo tries and fails to talk Vignette out of it. Leonora sends Imogen Agreus' right horn as a warning to speak to parliament or else. The Black Ravens bomb a tavern the cops frequent, killing all but one, who sees them. Tourmaline has a vision to see where the Sparas is who is revealed to be Major Vir.
18	10	"Carnival Row"	Andy Goddard	Sarah Byrd & Erik Oleson	March 17, 2023
Philo realizes the Sparas plans to attack parliament and goes to stop them. Leonora plans an ambush for the Burgish men who will soon overrun the police and storm the Row. Philo is nearly hung by the Burgish men. Imogen realizes Major Vir is with the New Dawn. She feigns fainting to warn Millworthy. He quietly confronts Major Vir. Agreus escapes. Dombey opens the Row's gate to the mob and they begin massacring the fae. Philo reaches parliament. Kaine and Vignette use themselves as bait and get the mob to chase them into the square used for the ambush. Philo tells Millworthy that Vir is the Sparas. Vir overhears them and attacks. Tourmaline draws the Sparas to her. Kaine dies and Leonora tries to shoot Vignette before springing the ambush. Darius' Marrok form tries to protect Tourmaline from the Sparas who also uses her magic to defend herself and Darius. Vignette and Philo also show up to help. It grabs Philo, who shoots it from inside its grasp. Darius dies from his injuries. Philo drags the Sparas' body to the square, announcing that parliament is safe, and the New Dawn try to go back into hiding. Agreus finds Leonora and attempts to turn her in by attracting the authorities, but she commits suicide. An off duty cop from the mob shoots Philo who is in turn shot by Dombey. Years later, Millworthy is back to being a performer with his kobolds. Philo addresses parliament, turning down the chancellery in favor of a full fae chancellor. Imogen reattaches Agreus' horn with a gold adhesive as they are now married and introduce electric lights to the city. Vignette and Tourmaline return to Tirnanoc and marry. The fae and Burgish get along better. Dombey is now an inspector. Philo and Millworthy enjoy the peace on Carnival Row.

== Production ==
=== Development ===
On January 9, 2015, Amazon Studios signed a development deal for the series which at the time had Guillermo del Toro on board as a co-writer, executive producer, and director. The series, set to be co-written by del Toro, Travis Beacham, and Rene Echeverria, is based on a feature film spec script written by Beacham, entitled A Killing on Carnival Row. The company ordered three scripts with the expectation that if the series went into production del Toro would direct the first episode. On June 6, 2016, the production was given a pilot order with the previously announced creative team still set to be involved.

On May 10, 2017, the production was given a series order with Beacham and Echeverria still executive producing, and with Echeverria expected to act as showrunner. Filmmaker Paul McGuigan was set to direct the series. By this point, del Toro had stepped away from the project, as his feature film schedule did not permit him to stay on as an executive producer as the project moved forward. On November 10, 2017, filmmaker Jon Amiel replaced McGuigan as director.

In July 2019, Amazon renewed the series for a second season. In November 2022, Amazon announced that the second season would serve as the series's last.

=== Casting ===
In August 2017, Orlando Bloom and Cara Delevingne were cast in the series' two lead roles. On September 22, 2017, it was reported that David Gyasi, Karla Crome, Indira Varma, and Tamzin Merchant had joined the main cast. In October 2017, it was announced that Simon McBurney, Alice Krige, and Jared Harris had been cast in recurring roles. On November 3, 2017, it was reported Ariyon Bakare was joining the series in a recurring capacity. On December 15, 2017, it was announced that Andrew Gower and Jamie Harris had been cast in recurring roles. On January 30, 2018, it was reported that Scott Reid had joined the cast as a series regular. On October 8, 2018, it was reported that Anna Rust had joined the cast in a recurring capacity.

=== Filming ===
The series spent almost five months in pre-production before filming began. The series was shot entirely in the Czech Republic throughout 108 shooting days. Principal photography began in October 2017. Much of the work was done at the Barrandov Studios in Prague, while locations included the city of Liberec, the chateaux in Frýdlant and Krnsko, and at the Prachov Rocks (Prachovské skály) area. Filming for the first season concluded on March 14, 2018.

Production on the second season commenced in November 2019 but was halted in March 2020 due to the coronavirus pandemic. As of the first week of May, preparations for resumption of production were underway. However, by June 2020, Amazon had yet to resume production on the series. Upon production halting due to the pandemic, the production team were reportedly three weeks away from concluding filming for the season. Filming for the second season continued in August 2020 in the Czech Republic. In a February 2021 interview, Tamzin Merchant revealed that only five out of eight episodes were wrapped up. Filming for the second season officially wrapped in September 2021. Production for the second season resumed in May 2021 in the Czech Republic, mainly to film the remaining scenes which involved Orlando Bloom, who was not available in 2020 due to the birth of his child. Filming of the second season also occurred in Croatia.

== Release ==
On June 3, 2019, it was announced that the series would premiere on August 30, 2019. The second and final season premiered on February 17, 2023, with episodes released weekly in batches of two episodes.

== Themes ==
The Chicago Tribune wrote that the show is about government oppression, sexism, and elitism. Travis Beacham, the original script writer and one of the executive producers, said that the show is also about class, race, and immigration. Despite the script being written 17 years before the show's production, the same issues were just as relevant by the time it aired. The show, based on a Victorian fantasy setting, served as a hypothetical space where political and social issues that reflected the real world could be safely discussed.

== Reception ==
=== Critical response ===
On Rotten Tomatoes, the first season of Carnival Row holds a 57% approval rating based on 68 reviews. The website's critical consensus reads, "Beautiful, but bloated, Carnival Row boasts meticulously crafted mythology and luscious world building—unfortunately its story of haves and have nots simply has too much going on to create anything cohesive." The second season holds a 44% approval rating based on 16 reviews. On Metacritic, the series has a weighted average score of 58 out of 100, based on 22 critics, indicating "mixed or average reviews".

Sam Brooks of the New Zealand-based The Spinoff noted that the premise of the show is "a mish-mash of influences and inspirations, from Neil Gaiman to Mortal Engines".

=== Accolades ===
Carnival Row was nominated for Best Genre Series at the 2020 Satellite Awards.

=== Other media ===
- Carnival Row: Tangle in the Dark – An audiobook about the first meeting of Tourmaline and Vignette ASIN B07WNY5FKG
- Carnival Row: From the Dark – comic starring Rycroft ASIN B0986D1L4M
- Carnival Row: Sparrowhawk – comic starring Vignette ASIN B0986CGN6Y
- Tales of Carnival Row – graphic novel anthology set in the Burgue ISBN 978-1681160931
- Carnival Row – roleplaying setting for the Cypher System
