= Interlude in Prague =

- Official poster
- Directed by: John Stephenson
- Screenplay by: Brian Ashby; Helen Clare Cromarty; John Stephenson
- Produced by: Huw Penallt Jones; Hannah Leader
- Starring: Aneurin Barnard; James Purefoy; Samantha Barks; Morfydd Clark; Adrian Edmondson; Anna Rust
- Cinematography: Mike Brewster
- Edited by: David Freeman
- Music by: Hybrid
- Production company: Stillking Films
- Release date: 11 May 2017 (London)
- Running time: 103 minutes
- Language: English
- Budget: £5 million

Interlude in Prague is a 2017 film about a fictional episode in the life of Wolfgang Amadeus Mozart that led to his writing the opera Don Giovanni. It stars Aneurin Barnard, James Purefoy, Samantha Barks, Morfydd Clark, Adrian Edmondson and Anna Rust. It was directed by John Stephenson, written by Brian Ashby and the screenplay by Brian Ashby, Helen Clare Cromarty and John Stephenson.

== Plot ==
In the year 1787, Mozart escapes Vienna for Prague, but his presence unleashes a series of dramatic events set off by a forbidden love affair with young soprano Zuzanna. His passionate response to danger and heartbreak ultimately expressed through his genius mind and the creation of one of his most famous masterpieces. A provocative twist on the Mozart biopic, with lust and murder.

== Cast ==
- Aneurin Barnard as Wolfgang Amadeus Mozart
- James Purefoy as Baron Saloka
- Samantha Barks as Josefa Duchek, Mozart's friend and host in Prague
- Morfydd Clark as Zuzanna Lubtak
- Adrian Edmondson as Herr Lubtak, Zuzanna's father
- Anna Rust as Hana, Saloka's maid
- Ruby Bentall as Barbarina, Josefa's maid
- Dervla Kirwan as Frau Lubtak, Zuzanna's mother

== Awards ==
In November 2017, the film won a Golden Angel Award for the Best International Co-Production Film at the Chinese American Film Festival.

== See also ==
- Mozart and Prague for a more historical perspective
