= Lisa Klein (writer) =

American writer

- Education: Indiana University Bloomington
- Occupations: Author, assistant professor of English

Lisa Klein is an American author known for her Shakespearean works including Ophelia and Lady Macbeth's Daughter. She was an assistant professor of English at Ohio State University for eight years but left when she was denied tenure. She turned to writing afterwards, publishing such books as Two Girls of Gettysburg and Cate of the Lost Colony, based on the tale of the Roanoke Colony. She lives in Columbus, Ohio, with her husband and two sons Dave Klein and Adam Reed.

== Life ==
Klein grew up in Peoria, Illinois.

== Career ==
Klein attended Marquette University. She graduated with a doctorate in English from Indiana University Bloomington. She became an eight-year assistant professor of English at Ohio State University but left after she was denied tenure. That same year she broke her leg. She changed her life to a new direction: writing.

Klein had written The Exemplary Sidney and the Elizabethan Sonneteer in college, and dabbled in writing in other ways in her earlier life, but after leaving The Ohio State University, she resumed writing, beginning with a book about her church, Be It Remembered: The Story of Trinity Episcopal Church on Capital Square, Columbus, Ohio.

She went on to publish the 2006 young adult novel, Ophelia, a perspective of Shakespeare's Hamlet that focuses on the tragic female character of Ophelia. Klein followed up with another young adult novel, Two Girls of Gettysburg, for which she traveled to Gettysburg, Pennsylvania to research the battle site. Originally, in Two Girls, Klein had set the home of the girls close enough to the battle to watch from their house. However, upon observing Gettysburg, Pennsylvania, Klein noted that a hill that is truly there would've blocked any fictional character in Two Girls from truly seeing the battle unfold. She therefore simply changed the location of the home in Two Girls to on top of that hill so that the two girls could have realistically seen the historic battle. Regardless, Lisa Klein noted that readers of Two Girls probably wouldn't have recognized the inconsistency of the hill had she not changed the home's location to on top of the hill, but said she wanted to make the book realistic and said she would have known there was an inconsistency in her own published writing, therefore the change was made.

For her third young adult novel, Lady Macbeth's Daughter, Klein created the character of Macbeth and Lady Macbeth's daughter as the main character. Although a child of the two legendary fictional Shakespeare characters is never directly seen or heard from in the original works of William Shakespeare, Klein contends that Lady Macbeth implies she has had a child when she speaks to Macbeth about nursing in Shakespeare's original play Macbeth, and therefore it is possible that Lady Macbeth did indeed have a daughter (or a son). Although possible that Lady Macbeth was implying she had had a male child whom she had nursed, Klein decided that the child should be female as to bring about a dominant female character in Shakespeare's work as Shakespeare wrote only about strong male characters.

Cate of the Lost Colony is Klein's most recent work, which is focused on the mysterious disappearance of settlers of the Roanoke Colony.

Klein works as a public speaker at schools discussing her work as a writer. She states in her presentation to students that she participated, as a child, in the national spelling bee held in Washington, D.C., and brings in a newspaper report covering that competition as proof.

== Personal life ==
Dr. Klein declines the use of "Dr." before her name as the honorary title of "Dr.", she says, seems to falsely imply that she is a medical doctor whereas she is actually a holder of a doctorate degree in literature.

Klein currently lives in Clintonville in Columbus, Ohio with her husband and two sons.
