= Lloyd Richards =

American theater director (1919–2006)

- Born: Lloyd George Richards; June 29, 1919; Toronto, Ontario, Canada
- Died: June 29, 2006 (aged 87); New York City, U.S.
- Occupations: Theatre director, actor
- Years active: 1947–1999
- Spouse: Barbara Davenport (1958-2006)
- Children: 2
- Awards: Tony Award Best Direction of a Play; 1987 Fences; Regional Theatre Tony Award; 1991 Yale Repertory Theatre; Drama Desk Outstanding New Play; 1987 Fences; 1990 The Piano Lesson; National Medal of Arts; 1993 Lifetime Achievement

Lloyd George Richards (June 29, 1919 – June 29, 2006) was a Canadian-American theatre director, and actor. While head of the National Playwrights Conference, he helped cultivate many of the most famous theater writers of the 20th century. He was also the dean of the Yale School of Drama from 1979 to 1991 (later Professor Emeritus), and was the first Black director on Broadway.

Among Richards' accomplishments are his staging the original production of Lorraine Hansberry's A Raisin in the Sun, debuting on Broadway to standing ovations, and in 1984 he introduced August Wilson to Broadway in Ma Rainey's Black Bottom.

== Early life and education ==
Richards was born in Toronto, Ontario on June 29, 1919. His name came from the then-current UK Prime Minister David Lloyd George, as his parents—Jamaicans who moved to Canada—were British subjects at the time.

His family moved to Detroit, Michigan in 1923 after seeing an advertisement for employment at Ford's auto-manufacturing plant. His father Albert Richards, a Jamaican carpenter turned auto-industry worker, died of diphtheria when Richards was nine years old. His mother, Rose Richards (née Coote), went blind when Richards was 13, due to what he said was the "inadequate treatment of a doctor."

Richards attended McMichael Middle School and Northwestern High School. To help make ends meet in the Great Depression, Richards and his brother Allan shined shoes and worked in a barbershop. Richards did not participate in plays in high school—which he explained in an interview by citing the largely white student body—but did some theater with the local Nacirema Club.

Richards originally enrolled to study at Detroit's Wayne University on the pre-law track, though he transitioned to studying acting and radio production. At Wayne, he worked as a janitor and part-time elevator operator to help fund his education.

After graduating in 1944, Richards volunteered for World War II service in the US Army Air Corps. His brother Allan was drafted and Richards learned that the Air Force was willing to train black volunteers with valuable skills—rather than employ them as menial support or infantry units like the other branches—so he joined. He never saw active combat, but he trained with the Tuskegee Airmen.

Richards returned to Detroit following the war. He worked as a social worker during the day, while working at a local radio station and performing with the Actors Company—a local community theater troupe, mainly of Wayne alumni—and the Paul Robeson Art Guild. Though he was the only black member of the Actors Company in an era of de jure racial segregation, he did not view himself as a political artist at the time, recalling in 2001 that:

It was not theater about making a statement, other than the statement that was in the play, you know. And we were not a theater that was about that. We were doing great plays and that we all loved. And we just did them, you know, and we didn't raise the question ourselves. Nobody seemed to raise it, at least in my earshot, and I was an important member of the company.

== Move to New York ==
In 1948, Richards moved from Detroit to New York City. He had wanted to go to New York to try to develop his acting career and cited a phone call from James Lipton—a school peer who had found early success in New York—as the direct impetus for his move. With Lipton's help, Richards auditioned for a couple Broadway productions and for the Actors Studio, but received rejections.

=== Acting tenure ===
Richards acted in low-paying off-Broadway productions while working odd jobs and receiving benefits provisioned by the GI Bill. Richards began working at the Paramount Pictures executive dining room as a waiter. He continued working there until A Raisin in the Sun, leading studio head Adolph Zukor to exclaim that "our waiter walked out of here and directed a Broadway play!"

Richards debuted as an actor on Broadway in 1950 in the one-act play Freight, which ran for 5 performances. In 1957, Richards made his second appearance on Broadway in Molly Kazan's The Egghead. Richards played a duplicitous communist student who Karl Malden's liberal professor vehemently defends from charges of communism. Brooks Atkinson reviewed his performance favorably, writing that "Mr. Richards plays the villain with enough skill, intelligence, and bravado to win the admiration of the audience in the end." A then-unknown James Earl Jones debuted on Broadway as Richards's understudy.

==== Paul Mann Actors Workshop ====
While performing in one off-Broadway play under director Paul Mann, Mann invited him to assist him with his acting school. At the Paul Mann Actors Workshop, Richards advanced rapidly from a clerical worker to a sought-after teacher of method acting. Through the workshop, he met his wife, the dancer Barbara Davenport, and Sidney Poitier. Richards became good friends with Poitier at the time as too relatively poor actors trying to break through on Broadway. One anecdote Richards shared told of how the two men shared a hot dog at one point, as neither wanted to spare the money on their own. At one point in this fallow period, Poitier promised him an opportunity as director, should Poitier earn a starring role. Richards also taught Moscow Art Theatre acting technique alongside Morris Carnovsky.

According to writer Samuel G. Freedman, the technique Mann and Richards used took a middle ground between the sociological techniques of Stella Adler and the psychiatric techniques of Lee Strasberg. As Poitier put it,

What [Richards] would do is question us not about our character but about ourselves, until you began to arrive at your own conclusions about your character. It was by looking at the various ways we deluded ourselves, the corners we cut, that we understood ourselves and our characters.

=== A Raisin in the Sun ===
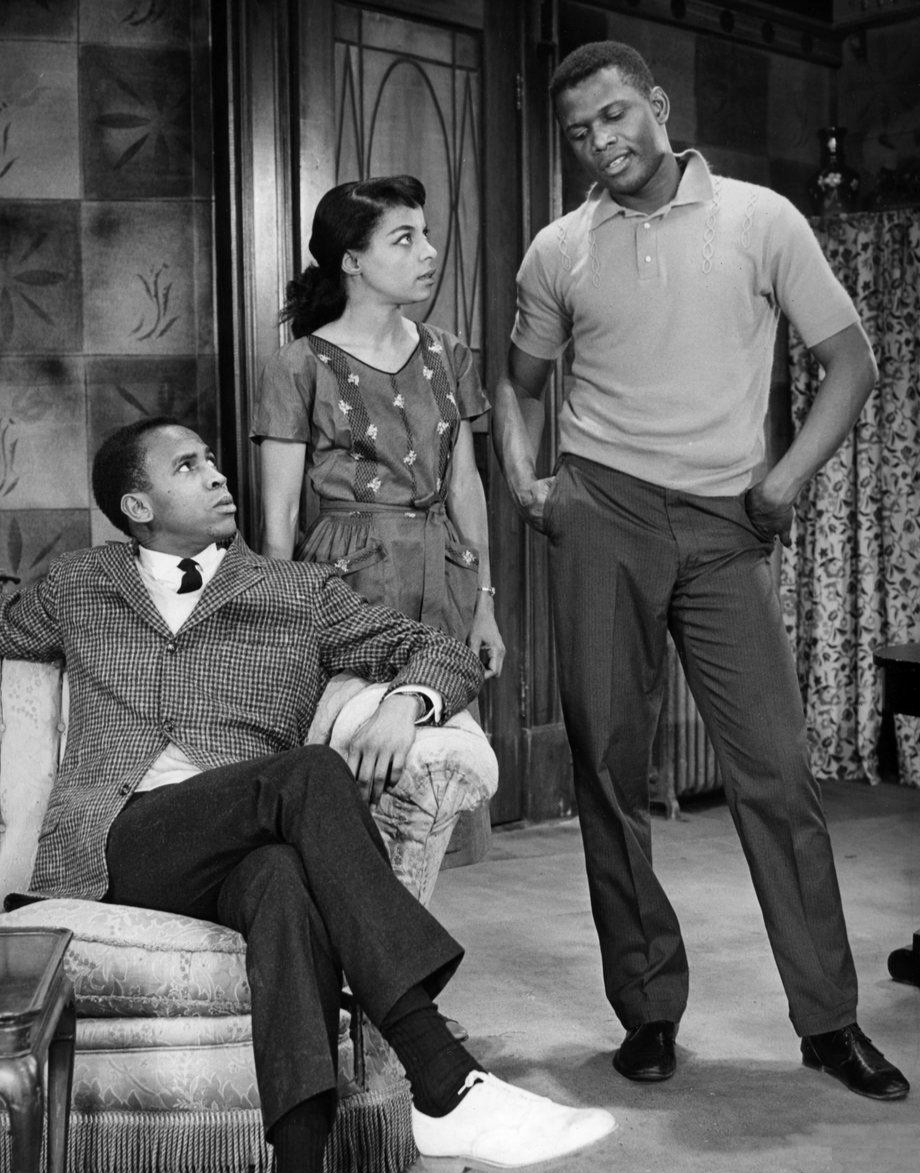
From left to right Louis Gossett Jr. (George Murchison), Ruby Dee (Ruth Younger) and Sidney Poitier (Walter Younger) performing A Raisin in the Sun in 1959. Poitier presented the script for the play to Richards, who became its original director.

In early 1958, Poitier sent Richards a script for A Raisin in the Sun. After reading it with his wife, Richards met with both producer Philip Rose and playwright Lorraine Hansberry and began collaborating on the project. Richards and Hansberry worked weekly to revise the script, wherein Hansberry would present her pages and Richards would make suggestions. They bonded over their mutual appreciation for the work of Anton Chekhov, Paul Robeson, and Seán O'Casey, whose Juno and the Paycock Hansberry used as a model during the revision process. Hansberry biographer Charles J. Shields argued that Richards was a major contributor to the final script, though it's not possible to compare the difference the revisions made as the original manuscript was lost.

Rose struggled to fund the production and tried to negotiate a fundraising partnership with Kermit Bloomgarden, but balked at his requirement that Ethel Waters replace Claudia McNeill as Lena Younger and that Richards be kept as director only on a provisional basis. After the Chicago tryout in February 1959, Chicago Tribune Claudia "Acidy" Cassidy gave the play a mostly positive review and wrote that Richards's direction was "so right that [the play's] false spots are probably on their way out this morning."

The play debuted on March 11, 1959 at the Ethel Barrymore Theatre and ran for 530 performances. As it was the first Broadway show directed by a black person and written by a black woman, featuring a story about contemporary black characters, there was some doubt that it would be accepted by largely white, largely upper class audiences. On its opening night, the play receiving standing ovation from audiences, with Poitier calling from the stage for Hansberry and Richards to be given their own ovations.

The Broadway production received positive reviews. Brooks Atkinson wrote that Richards's direction brought about "explosions in the performance. But the explosions never give an impression of being arbitrary." Kenneth Tynan praised the play, concluding that Richards specifically had "done a sensible, sensitive, and impeccable job."

Richards also directed the European premiere in July 1959, which originated at the Bristol Hippodrome before transferring to the Adelphi Theatre on London's West End. British critics gave the production mixed reviews.

Richards did not direct Hansberry's future plays, though they maintained a friendly relationship until her death in 1963. In 1959, James Baldwin corresponded with Hansberry "begging" for her to send along his manuscript for The Amen Corner to Richards for his feedback.

=== Other directing work ===
In the years after A Raisin in the Sun, Richards directed multiple other productions on Broadway:

- The Long Dream (1960, Ketti Frings)
- The Moon Besieged (1962, Seyril Schochen)
- I Had a Ball (1964, Jack Lawrence & Stan Freeman)
- The Yearling musical (Note: Richards resigned from the play during the preview, but was still credited as director. The musical closed on Broadway after 3 performances.) (1965, Michael Leonard & Herbert Martin)
- Paul Robeson (1978, Philip Hayes Dean)

Richards was attached to Peter Feibleman's Tiger, Tiger Burning Bright, which premiered on Broadway in 1962 under Joshua Logan's direction. He also directed a version of Arthur Miller's The Crucible—based on its original, non-Broadway script—for Boston University in May 1962. Defining the period before he joined the Eugene O'Neill Theater Center, critic Michael Feingold noted that what Richards "did after the huge success of Raisin was immediately not do another black family play."

Richards also directed a production of James Baldwin's The Amen Corner starring Claudia McNeill to tour in Europe, which ran on Broadway in a separate (but concurrent) production directed by Frank Silvera. The play—produced by Ellis Haizlip and Rudolph Stoiber—premiered at the Vienna Festival in June 1965, with subsequent stagings at the Théâtre des Nations, West End's Savile Theatre, and at venues in Amsterdam, Munich, Jerusalem, and other cities. Baldwin preferred Richards and Haizlip's production and unsuccessfully tried to intercede to stop Silvera's production from advancing to Broadway in its favor.

== The Eugene O'Neill Theater Center ==
Richards (right) with O'Neill founder George C. White, pictured in 1966

Richards first went to the Eugene O'Neill Theater Center in 1966—its second season of existence—to direct Joel Oliansky's Bedford Forrest, about the Confederate general and an emancipated man's attempt to kill him. The production, starring James Edwards, was one of the O'Neill's first full undertakings, with Richards arriving before the construction on the play's stage was completed.

Founder George C. White brought in Richards as Bedford Forrest's director at Oliansky's request. The play was an early stage credit for Michael Douglas, whose step-father helped found the O'Neill. Richards directed Douglas multiple times at the O'Neill, including as the lead in Bill Cowen's Summertree—which later ran on Broadway—and Neil Yarema's Rainless Sky. Richards also worked with Cowen on his follow-up to Summertree—a musical called Redemption Center—as well as Joe Julian's Man Around the House and Thomas Oliver Crehore's Just Before Morning. Jeffrey Sweet quoted Douglas describing his relationship with Richards:

I had just recently decided to pursue acting. I was very undeveloped. I remember a lot of personal direction from Lloyd Richards, who was a great teacher. He was very articulate. And when something was funny, he had one of the greatest laughs—just from the bottom of his soul. Nothing made you happier than pleasing him.

After a tumultuous National Playwrights Conference in 1968, White invited Richards to become the O'Neill's inaugural artistic director. Richards was the choice—over contenders that included Melvin Bernhardt—due to his experience, his compatibility with the O'Neill system, and what White described as his father-like and "sort of magisterial" qualities. When he became artistic director, Richards planned to refrain from directing individual shows for the O'Neill, focusing on the broader slate.

With White, Richards revived the concept of the dramaturg, which the O'Neill subsequently helped popularize in the American theater community. Before they developed the role, the O'Neill featured polarizing talkbacks with press critics and audience that meant playwrights "were often at the mercy of some terribly inept critics in very influential positions," decreasing their "ability to experiment freely." When searching for an alternative, White suggested Bertolt Brecht's work as a dramaturg as a guide. Richards researched and eventually implemented dramaturgs for all productions at the O'Neill—one for every four plays—including prominent critics John Lahr, Edith Oliver, and Michael Feingold.

In 1970, Richards went to Nigeria to meet with Wole Soyinka, a political dissident in the country's waning civil war, to invite him to the O'Neill. He workshopped the play he wrote about his prison experience, Madmen and Specialists, with Richards, premiering it in August.

Richards's major roles in the annual National Playwrights' Conference including selecting plays from playwright submissions, (Note: When Richards began in the late 1960s, the O'Neill received 200 submissions annually. When he announced his retirement in 1999, the program received 1,600 a year.) running the feedback sessions for new plays, and adjudicating disputes. As White described Richards's impact, "what is known as the O'Neill Process should rightfully be known as the Richards Process."

As head of the National Playwrights Conference at the Eugene O'Neill Theater Center, he helped develop the careers of August Wilson, Wendy Wasserstein, Christopher Durang, Lee Blessing and David Henry Hwang.

== Yale School of Drama and Yale Repertory Theatre ==
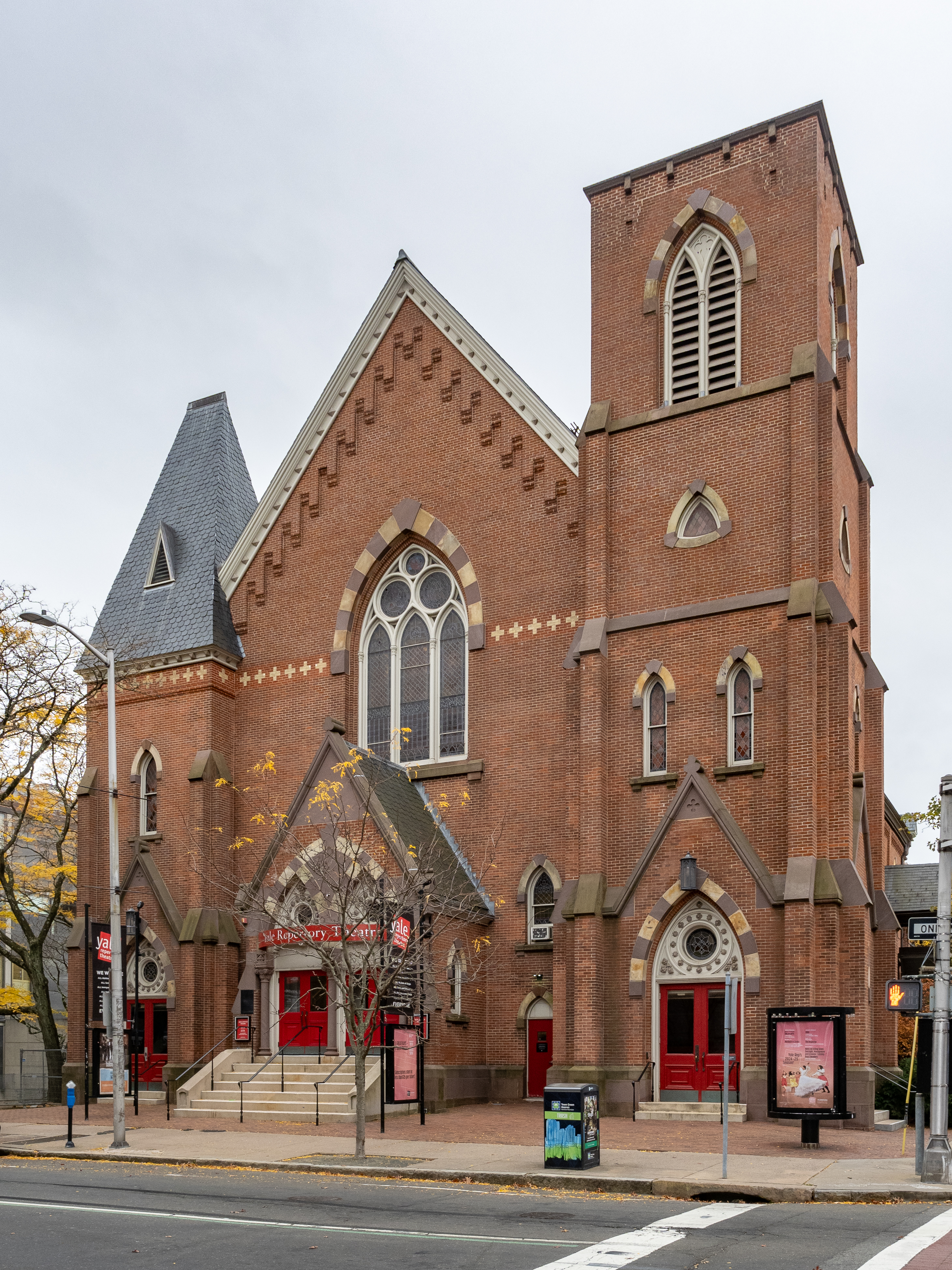
The Yale Repertory Theatre, where Richards served as artistic director from 1979 to 1991.

Yale President A. Bartlett Giamatti appointed Richards the dean of Yale School of Drama (which made him artistic director of Yale Repertory Theatre) in 1979 to replace Robert Brustein. Giamatti originally offered the role to White—who was a childhood friend—but he declined it and strongly recommended Richards. Both White and Richards required that he be allowed to continue working as O'Neill artistic director during the summertime National Playwrights Conference.

Richards served as YSD dean and Yale Rep artistic director in New Haven, Connecticut from 1979 to 1991; he became Professor Emeritus at Yale School of Drama after his retirement. Though he continued the Yale Rep's tradition of prestige, Yale Rep chronicler James Magruder described Richards's personality as a break from the pugnacious style of Brustein. While the lanky Brustein enjoyed arguing and was criticized as imperious, "Richards, by contrast, was diminutive, rotund, soft-spoken, and circumspect with his language."

In his first season, Richards brought James Earl Jones to the Yale Rep as the lead in the little-produced history play Timon of Athens. Richards himself directed the production, which received middling reviews. Jones joined Timon in a deal with Richards that would allow him to also lead the American premiere of A Lesson from Aloes.

Richards directed Jones as Judge Brack in a 1981 production of Hedda Gabler, starring Dianne Wiest. For The New York Times, Mel Gussow praised Richards's direction of Wiest and Jones, in what he described as an "uncharacteristic, but formfitting role." In 1982, Richards also directed Wiest (as Nora) in A Doll's House, alongside Richard Jenkins (as Torvald).

In his second year, Richards instituted the Yale Rep's Winterfest, which would showcase a slate of four new plays each January. The first Winterfest featured three works from O'Neill alumni—OyamO's The Resurrection of Lady Lester, Corinne Jacker's Domestic Issues and Sybille Pearson's Sally and Marsha—as well as Rococo by Harry Kondoleon.

The Winterfest continued throughout Richards's tenure, but his successor Stan Wojewodski Jr. ended the program in 1992. It also provided opportunities for craftwork-focused YSD students to participate in Winterfest productions, which was unusual for other works at the semi-professional Yale Rep.

=== Directing work ===
In addition to serving as Yale Rep artistic director, Richards also directed individual plays:

Date	Play	Playwright	Notes	Ref.
1980	Timon of Athens	William Shakespeare	Starring James Earl Jones	
1981	Hedda Gabler	Henrik Ibsen	Starring Dianne Wiest and James Earl Jones	
1981	Uncle Vanya	Anton Chekhov	Starring Lee Wallace and Glenn Close	
1982	Johnny Bull	Kathleen Betsko	Starring Suzanne Shepherd	
1982	A Doll's House	Henrik Ibsen	Starring Dianne Wiest and Richard Jenkins	
1983	A Touch of the Poet	Eugene O'Neill	Starring George Grizzard	
1983	Major Barbara	George Bernard Shaw		
1984	Ma Rainey's Black Bottom	August Wilson	Starring Theresa Merritt and Charles Dutton	
1985	Fences	August Wilson	Starring James Earl Jones, Courtney B. Vance, and Mary Alice	
1986	Joe Turner's Come and Gone	August Wilson	Starring Charles Dutton, featuring Angela Bassett	
1987	The Piano Lesson	August Wilson	Starring Samuel L. Jackson and Starletta DuPois	
1989	Cobb	Lee Blessing	Starring Chris Cooper and Delroy Lindo	
1990	Two Trains Running	August Wilson	Starring Samuel L. Jackson and Laurence Fishburne	
1991	A Moon for the Misbegotten	Eugene O'Neill	Starring Frances McDormand and David Strathairn	

=== Athol Fugard ===
Richards first spoke to the playwright Athol Fugard in 1979 at the request of James Earl Jones, who wanted Richards to invite him to Yale Rep to stage A Lesson from Aloes. Over the course of Richards's Yale Rep tenure, Fugard premiered "Master Harold"...and the Boys—starring Danny Glover, Željko Ivanek, and Zakes Mokae—The Road to Mecca—starring Carmen Matthews, Tom Aldredge, and Marianne Owen—and A Place with the Pigs—starring himself and Suzanne Shepherd. The theater also hosted restaged versions of A Lesson from Aloes, Blood Knot, and Boesman and Lisa.

Fugard described Yale Rep as a "home away from home," defined in part by the " very, very trusting, supportive, understanding relationship with Lloyd." As Fugard often directed his own plays, Richards was his main consistent collaborator at the theater.

Due to Fugard's productivity at Yale Rep, Samuel G. Freedman wrote that the two men had "sealed a creative and personal partnership almost unparalleled in the American theater." Fugard described their relationship as laconic, but mutually respectful. He also spoke about how Richards minded his struggle with alcoholism, which he felt reflected his humanistic approach to their partnership. After Fugard derided the O'Neill process and its extensive use of dramaturgs, Richards invited him to the O'Neill to work as a dramaturg on the play The Trinity Site by Janeice Scarborough.

== Personal life ==
Richards married dancer Barbara Davenport in October 1957. They had two sons, one of whom was a freshman at Yale when Richards's appointment to the faculty was announced. He was invited to serve on the board of True Colors Theatre in Atlanta, which opened in 2002.

== Death and legacy ==
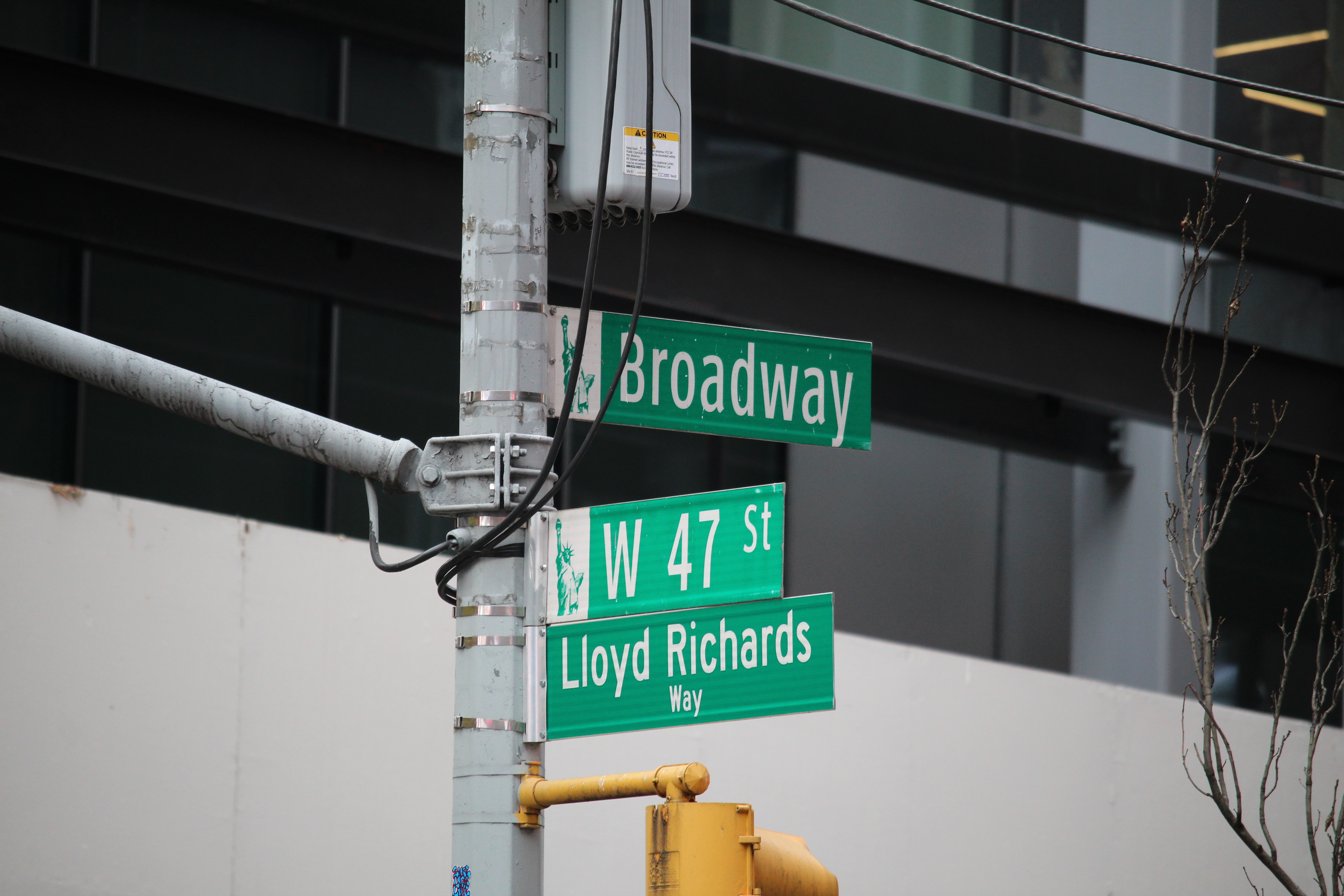
Lloyd Richards Way on 47th Street between Broadway and 8th Avenue, pictured in 2026

Richards died of heart failure on his eighty-seventh birthday in New York City. The Broadway League dimmed the lights at all Broadway theaters for one minute at 8 p.m. on June 30, 2006 in Richards's honor. After his death, Laurence Fishburne said that "anybody of my generation that was under Lloyd’s tutelage got some of the best fathering and nurturing of your creativity that you could get." Charles Dutton commented to The New York Times that "Lloyd had only two sons, but he had a lot of children."

Richards was predeceased by August Wilson and Benjamin Mordecai, who both died in 2005 at age 60. Mordecai was Richards's managing director at Yale Rep and he continued to work with Wilson after the Wilson-Richards split, making them three men particularly associated with The Pittsburgh Cycle. Marion McClinton, who succeeded Richards as Wilson's director-of-choice, credited him with opening opportunity as the first black director on Broadway.

No black director would be working today if not for him. There are no more giants, that’s the way I feel. He took something and changed it—and many lives—forever.

June 29, 2023 was named Lloyd Richards Day was named by Council Member Erik Bottcher. On June 29, 2024, Lloyd Richards Way was named on 47th Street between Broadway & 8th Avenue.

== Awards and nominations ==
Awards

- 1987: Drama Desk Award Outstanding New Play - Fences
- 1987: Tony Award Best Direction of a Play - Fences
- 1987: Tony Award Best Play - Fences
- 1987: Golden Plate Award of the American Academy of Achievement
- 1990: Drama Desk Award Outstanding New Play - The Piano Lesson
- 1991: Regional Theatre Tony Award - Yale Repertory Theatre
- 1993: National Medal of Arts
- 2002: The Dorothy and Lillian Gish Prize

Nominations

- 1960: Tony Award Best Direction of a Play - A Raisin in the Sun
- 1981: Tony Award Best Play - A Lesson From Aloes
- 1987: Drama Desk Award Outstanding Director of a Play - Fences
- 1988: Drama Desk Award Outstanding Director of a Play - Joe Turner's Come and Gone
- 1988: Drama Desk Award Outstanding New Play - Joe Turner's Come and Gone
- 1988: Tony Award Best Direction of a Play - Joe Turner's Come and Gone
- 1988: Tony Award Best Play - A Walk in the Woods
- 1988: Tony Award Best Play - Joe Turner's Come and Gone
- 1989: Drama Desk Award Outstanding Revival - Long Day's Journey Into Night
- 1989: Tony Award Best Revival - Ah, Wilderness!
- 1990: Drama Desk Award Outstanding Director of a Play - The Piano Lesson
- 1990: Tony Award Best Direction of a Play - The Piano Lesson
- 1990: Tony Award Best Play - The Piano Lesson
- 1996: Drama Desk Award Outstanding Director of a Play - Seven Guitars
- 1996: Tony Award Best Direction of a Play - Seven Guitars
