= List of works derived from Hamlet =

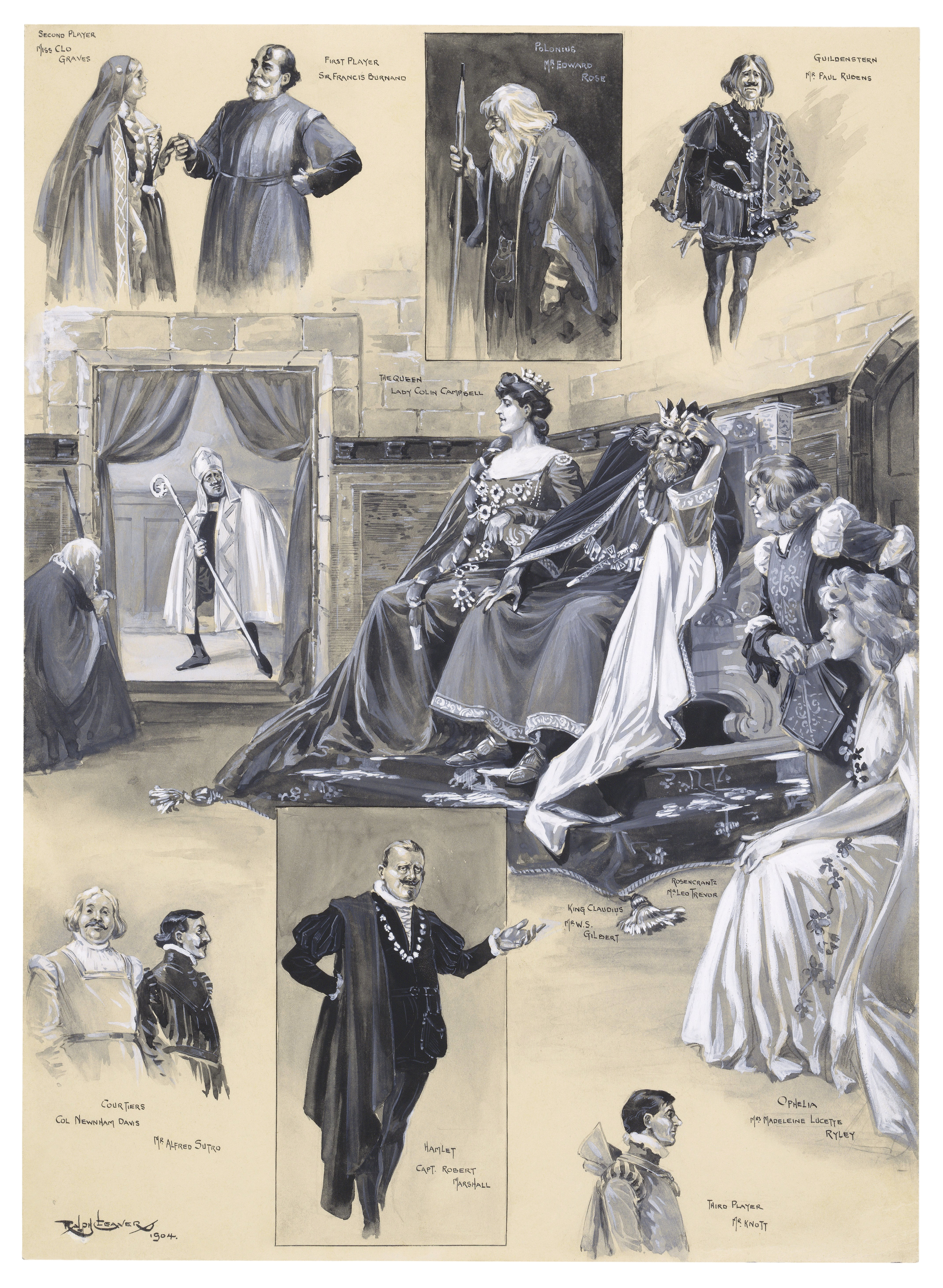
Scenes from a 1904 benefit performance of W. S. Gilbert's Rosencrantz and Guildenstern, with Gilbert as Claudius

Works in several different genres have been derived from William Shakespeare's play Hamlet.

== Stage ==
Tom Stoppard's 1966 play Rosencrantz and Guildenstern Are Dead retells many of the events of the story from the point of view of the characters Rosencrantz and Guildenstern and gives them a backstory of their own. Several times since 1995, the American Shakespeare Center has mounted repertories that included both Hamlet and Rosencrantz and Guildenstern, with the same actors performing the same roles in each.

W. S. Gilbert wrote a short comic play titled Rosencrantz and Guildenstern, in which Hamlet's play is presented as a tragedy written by Claudius in his youth of which he is greatly embarrassed. Through the chaos triggered by Hamlet's staging of it, Guildenstern helps Rosencrantz vie with Hamlet to make Ophelia his bride.

In China, performances of Hamlet often have political significance: Gu Wuwei's 1916 The Usurper of State Power, an amalgam of Hamlet and Macbeth, was an attack on Yuan Shikai's attempt to overthrow the republic.

Lee Blessing's Fortinbras is a comical sequel to Hamlet in which all the deceased characters come back as ghosts. The New York Times said it is "scarcely more than an extended comedy sketch, lacking the portent and linguistic complexity of Tom Stoppard's Rosencrantz and Guildenstern Are Dead. Fortinbras operates on a far less ambitious plane, but it is a ripping yarn and offers Keith Reddin a role in which he can commit comic mayhem".

Caridad Svich's 12 Ophelias (a play with broken songs) includes elements of the story of Hamlet but focuses on Ophelia. In Svich's play, Ophelia is resurrected and rises from a pool of water, after her death in Hamlet. The play is a series of scenes and songs, and was first staged at a public swimming pool in Brooklyn.

David Davalos's Wittenberg is a "tragical-comical-historical" prequel to Hamlet that depicts the Danish prince as a student at Wittenberg University (now known as the University of Halle-Wittenberg), where he is torn between the conflicting teachings of his mentors John Faustus and Martin Luther. The New York Times reviewed the play, saying, "Mr. Davalos has molded a daft campus comedy out of this unlikely convergence", and Nytheatre.com's review said the playwright "has imagined a fascinating alternate reality, and quite possibly, given the fictional Hamlet a back story that will inform the role for the future."

Mad Boy Chronicle by Canadian playwright Michael O'Brien is a dark comedy loosely based on Hamlet, set in Viking Denmark in 999 AD.

In 2025 Radiohead's Thom Yorke collaborated with directors Steven Hoggett and Christine Jones at the Royal Shakespeare Company to make a work fusing Hamlet with Radiohead's album Hail to the Thief. The work featured Samuel Blenkin as Hamlet.

== Ballet ==
- John Neumeier produced the ballet Amleth based on the Hamlet story, with music by Michael Tippett, in 1986.
- Steve Austin poduced a ballet of Hamlet with the music of Philip Glass in 2000.

== Music ==
=== Classical ===
- Hamlet is an 1858 symphonic poem by Franz Liszt influenced by a powerful Weimar performance of the central role by Bogumil Dawison which was said to contrast sharply with the "passive, dreamer" Hamlets of his time.
- Johannes Brahms set to music Schlegel and Tieck's German translations of five songs from Hamlet in 1873.
- Edward German's 1897 symphonic poem Hamlet evoked certain themes and essences of the play but made no attempt to follow its plotline.
- Boris Blacher wrote a symphonic poem based on Hamlet in 1940.
- Hans Werner Henze's 1970 Sonatas on Shakespearean Characters which later became known as Royal Winter Music includes a section on Ophelia.
- John Tavener's choral work Song for Athene, performed at the funeral of Diana, Princess of Wales, draws it lyrics from the bible and from Horatio's lines upon the death of Hamlet.

=== Jazz ===
- Hamlet's plight inspired "Madness in Great Ones" from Such Sweet Thunder by Duke Ellington.
- Ophelia's plight inspired "Alas Sweet Lady" by Stan Tracey from Will Power. (Note: The album's full title is Will Power - A Shakespeare Birthday Celebration In Music (1975) by Neil Ardley, Ian Carr, Mike Gibbs and Stan Tracey.)

=== Popular music ===
- Natalie Merchant's song "Ophelia" from the album of the same name represents a feminist response to Ophelia's situation.
- In a similar vein, Jewel's song "Innocence Maintained" from the album Spirit also represents a feminist response to Ophelia's situation.

== Screen ==
Disney's 1994 animated musical film The Lion King is an adaptation of the main plot of Hamlet.

The 2014 Bollywood film Haider is an adaptation set in modern Kashmir.

== Sources ==
- Brandes, Philip (5 July 2001). "A Viking Helmet for Hamlet in Satirical Mad Boy Chronicle". Los Angeles Times.
- Davis, Clive (8 May 2025). "Hamlet Hail to the Thief review". Radiohead's Shakespearean maelstrom.
- Ebert, Roger (June 24, 1994). "The Lion King review". Chicago Sun-Times. Archived from the original on July 8, 2014 – via RogerEbert.com. "Basically what we have here is a drama, with comedy occasionally lifting the mood."
- Gilbert, W. S. (1892). "Rosencrantz and Guildenstern". Foggerty's Fairy: and other tales. London: George Routledge & Sons.
- Gillies, John; Minami, Ryuta; Li, Ruru; Trivedi, Poonam. "Shakespeare on the Stages of Asia". In Wells & Stanton (2002), pp. 259–283.
- Grode, Eric (30 March 2011). "Dueling Mentors Bedevil a Dithering Young Dane". Theater Reviews. The New York Times.
- Gupta, Priya (7 February 2014). "Bollywood returns to their favourite destination Kashmir". The Times of India.
- Gussow, Mel (3 April 1992). "A High-Keyed Hamlet Starring Stephen Lang". The New York Times.
- Howard, Tony. "Shakespeare's Cinematic Offshoots". In Jackson (2000), pp. 295–313.
- Jackson, Russell, ed. (2000). The Cambridge Companion to Shakespeare on Film. Cambridge Companions to Literature. Cambridge: Cambridge University Press. ISBN 0-521-63975-1.
- Sanders, Julie (2007). Shakespeare and Music: Afterlives and Borrowings. Polity Press. ISBN 978-07456-3297-1.
- Schultz, David G. (16 July 2008). "A Play at Poolside: Caridad Svich's 12 Ophelias". The Brooklyn Rail.
- Thompson, Ann; Taylor, Neil, eds. (2006). Hamlet. Arden Shakespeare, third series. Vol. 1. London: Cengage Learning. ISBN 1-904271-33-2.
- Thompson, Ann; Taylor, Neil, eds. (2016). Hamlet - Revised Edition. Arden Shakespeare, third series. Vol. 1. London: Bloomsbury. ISBN 978-1-4725-1838-5.
- Todoroff, Aimee (19 March 2011). "Wittenberg". Nytheatre.com. Archived from the original on 23 October 2017.
- Warren, Jim (n.d.). "Every Exit is an Entrance Someplace Else". Director's Notes. American Shakespeare Center. Archived from the original on 22 December 2015.
- Wells, Stanley; Stanton, Sarah, eds. (2002). The Cambridge Companion to Shakespeare on Stage. Cambridge Companions to Literature. Cambridge: Cambridge University Press. ISBN 0-521-79711-X.
