= Fortinbras (disambiguation) =

Fortinbras is the fictional prince of Norway in Shakespeare's play Hamlet.

It may also refer to:

- Fortinbras, a character from the PlayStation 2 game Onimusha: Warlords
- Fortinbras (play), a play by Lee Blessing

== See also ==
- Fortebraccio
