= Cobb (play) =

1989 play by Lee Blessing

- Original language: English
- Written by: Lee Blessing
- Characters: The Peach; Ty; Mr. Cobb; Oscar Charleston

Premiere
- Date: March 21, 1989
- Place: Yale Repertory Theatre; New Haven, Connecticut
- Directed by: Lloyd Richards

Cobb is a memory play written by Lee Blessing about the baseball player Ty Cobb. The play originally premiered in 1989 at the Yale Repertory Theater in New Haven, starring Chris Cooper and Delroy Lindo. It later ran off-Broadway in 2000 at the Lucille Lortel Theater.

The play features three actors playing Cobb at different points in his life, considering his violent streak and talent in relation to newcomers like Babe Ruth. The production also features an actor playing his contemporary, Oscar Charleston, the Negro league player unwillingly nicknamed "The Black Cobb."

== Plot ==
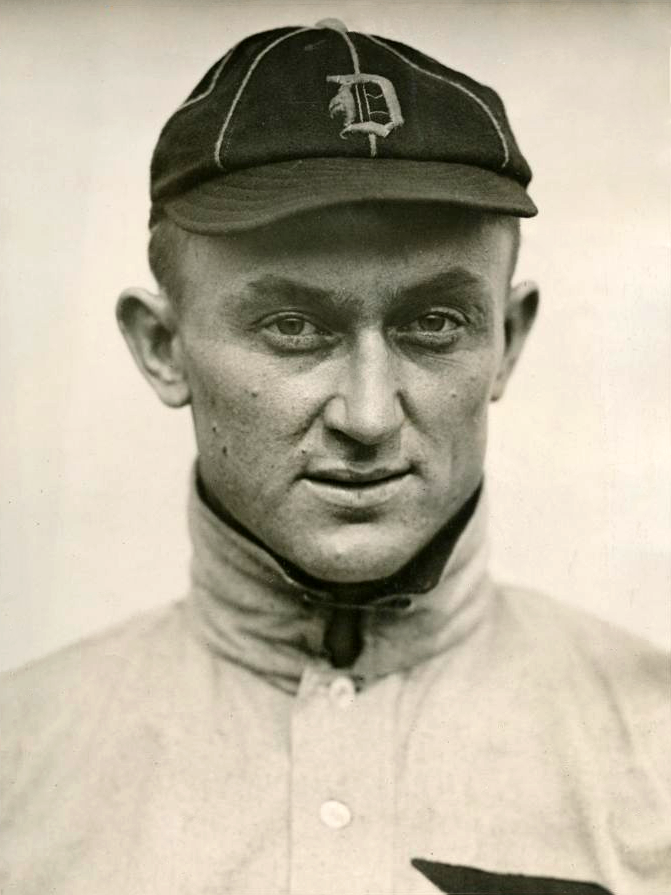
Ty Cobb in 1913. Three actors play Cobb at different stages in his life, extending into his retirement.

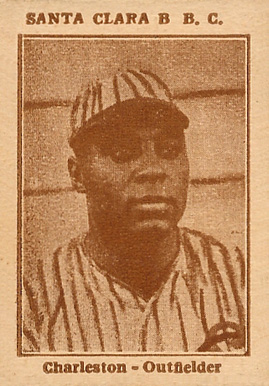
A 1923 baseball card of Oscar Charleston, one of baseball's all-time slugging leaders; a character depicted in Cobb

The play's plot proceeds as a series of monologues about the life of Ty Cobb and his era of baseball. Three versions of Cobb at different ages talk about their memory of their life in baseball, with Negro leagues player Oscar Charleston also appearing to correct or challenge Cobb's perspective. The play is one-act with no intermission.

The Peach reflects on Cobb's early playing career and the murder of his father by his mother when Cobb was 18. He also gleefully speaks on how he would pick fights on and off the field, often with black people. The character Ty re-frames his violent tendencies as something he would do to throw off his competitors. He also expresses bitterness at his divorce, his unpopularity, and the course baseball has taken by the end of his career. Mr. Cobb again reframes aspects of his life, taking a more melancholic view. Though he was chosen to be part of the first class of Baseball Hall of Fame inductees, he feels that baseball left him behind.

In one monologue, Ty describes his process to scoring runs by taunting the pitcher, using his sharpened cleat-spikes to intimidate infielders, and manufacturing bases before he ultimately steals home. He expresses his resentment of Babe Ruth, who both shifted playing style away from Cobb's small-ball style toward his own long-ball style and who became beloved among fans. Ruth reappears in the dialogue as a foil for Cobb, with set decorations often displaying his image.

Oscar Charleston often appears throughout the narrative, to talk about his own playing career and antagonize the various Cobbs. Charleston was himself a superlative player and a center-fielder with a known temper, so he was referred to as the "Black Cobb" by the white baseball press. Though Cobb's Detroit Tigers occasionally played exhibition games against Charleston's Indianapolis ABCs between 1915 and 1923, Cobb would refuse to participate. Charleston taunts the Cobbs that he was the better player, unfalsifiable as they never played each other on the diamond.

== Characters ==
The play features a cast of four actors. Three play Cobb at different points in his life, both remembering his career and reflecting on his image.

- The Peach: Taken from Cobb's nickname "The Georgia Peach," this character is Cobb at 19, early in his major league career. The Peach revels in Cobb's violence toward other players, fans, and bystanders, including his many black victims. He also reflects on the murder of his father by his mother, which occurred when Cobb was 18.
- Ty: Cobb, in his 40s, at the end of his baseball career. Costumed in a pinstripe suit, Ty boasts about his smart business decisions as a self-made millionaire and his tactical expertise. Ty expresses more bitterness than The Peach, especially in the context of his divorce and Babe Ruth.
- Mr. Cobb: Cobb on death's doorstep, after he has been inducted into the National Baseball Hall of Fame. Mr. Cobb reflects on his bad image, the consequences of his youthful behavior, and how the sport has left him behind.

A fourth actor plays Oscar Charleston, Cobb's contemporary who played in the Negro leagues. Due to his excellence and his style of play, he was referred to as the "Black Cobb," which he resents. Charleston frequently challenges the memory of the three Cobbs and taunts them for his refusal to play against him in various exhibition games from 1915 to 1923.

Characters	Yale Repertory Theatre	Lucille Lortel Theatre
Characters	1989	2000
The Peach	James E. Reynolds	Matthew Mabe
Ty	Chris Cooper	Michael Sabatino
Mr. Cobb	Josef Summer	Michael Cullen
Oscar Charleston	Delroy Lindo	Clark Jackson

== Development ==
Playwright Lee Blessing drew inspiration for the play after reading the 1984 biography Ty Cobb by Charles Alexander. He found Cobb a uniquely unsentimental figure in the generally romantic sport of baseball. Blessing also wanted to explore the sport of baseball—which he had previously in Old-Timers Game (1982)—and how Cobb made a historic innovation in the sport, which he compared to the way William T. Sherman changed warfare. Blessing describes the show as a "one-man play for four men".

Blessing's previous play A Walk in the Woods was a finalist for the Pulitzer Prize for Drama in 1987 and received a nomination for the Tony Award for Best Play in 1988. Following its premiere at Yale Rep, the two-hander about American-Soviet relations ran on Broadway starring Robert Prosky and Sam Waterston. Blessing identified Lloyd Richards as the play's champion during its original development. After Richards passed on directing A Walk in the Woods due to scheduling conflicts, he still wanted to work with Blessing.

Richards directed the Yale Rep premiere production from March 21 to April 15, 1989, starring Chris Cooper and Delroy Lindo. He also directed a version with a largely different cast for San Diego's Old Globe Theatre in 1990. The San Diego cast featured James E. Reynolds returning as The Peach, George Gerdes as Ty, William Newman as Mr. Cobb, and Dan Martin as Oscar Charleston.

After negative reviews, the play did not receive a commercial production. After seeing a revival in 2000, Kevin Spacey helped fund its off-Broadway stint at the Lucille Lortel Theatre. The impetus for his attending the play was Matthew Mabe, an understudy in The Iceman Cometh with Spacey, who played The Peach.

== Reception ==
New York Times chief theater critic Frank Rich gave a negative review of the Yale Rep premiere. Though he lauded Richards's direction of the "excellent cast," Rich referred to the play's themes about America, mythology, and baseball as "intellectually shallow and dramatically inert." He likewise criticized the role that Charleston's character plays in the narrative.

"The burden of representing all victims of racism and segregation—in Cobb's society and in baseball—robs the character of his individuality, turning him into a blandly angelic archetype. Worse, Mr. Blessing implies that Cobb's and baseball's deep-rooted bigotry might have been ameliorated if only a Cobb and a Charleston had faced each other on the field or on the bench."

Los Angeles Times critic Sylvie Drake, reviewing the 1990 San Diego run, applauded the casting and directing, but concluded that Cobb was "a dramatically placid play that trades off surprise for insight and well-placed zingers, sometimes attached to little-known fact."

Variety critic Robert Hofler praised the 2000 off-Broadway production, comparing it favorably to Edward Albee's Three Tall Women. New York Times critic Bruce Weber reviewed the 2000 production positively. Though he felt Charleston was employed in a heavy-handed fashion, Weber wrote that Cobb was a "subtly potent illustration of how a man's view of himself alters over time, even as he holds fiercely to his self-righteousness and self-importance."

In a review of a 2002 production at Burbank's Falcon Theatre—featuring the off-Broadway cast, with Richard Brooks as Charleston—Los Angeles Times reviewer Sean Mitchell wrote that the play was "limited by a writer's fantasy," though also "more real and memorable than anything you’re likely to see on the ESPN Classic channel."

== Awards ==
The cast in the off-Broadway production of Cobb at the Lucille Lortel Theatre in New York was awarded the 2001 Drama Desk Special Award for Outstanding Ensemble Performance by Michael Cullen, Clark Jackson, Matthew Mabe, and Michael Sabatino.

== See also ==
- Cobb (film), a 1994 film starring Tommy Lee Jones
