= Batman Forever (score) =

Batman Forever: Original Motion Picture Score Album

Film score by Elliot Goldenthal
- Released: July 11, 1995
- Genres: Soundtrack; score
- Length: 41:01
- Label: Atlantic
- Producer: Matthias Gohl

Elliot Goldenthal chronology
| Cobb (1994) | Batman Forever: Original Motion Picture Score Album (1995) | Heat (1995) |

Professional ratings
Review scores
| Source | Rating |
|---|---|
| Allmusic | 2.5/5 stars |
| Filmtracks | 2/5 stars |
| Movie Music UK | 4/5 stars |
| Musicfromthemovies | favorable |
| Scoresounds | 9/10 stars |
| Soundtrack-Express | 3/5 stars |

Batman Forever: Original Motion Picture Score Album is the score album for the 1995 film Batman Forever, composed by Elliot Goldenthal. It was released in conjunction with its soundtrack counterpart. Despite Goldenthal having recorded over 2 hours of music, the soundtrack only had 45 minutes before La-La Land Records released an expanded version in 2012. The score features big brass, strings and discordant noises while maintaining an anthemic sound. Regarding the villainous leitmotifs, Goldenthal said Two-Face features paired notes and doubled beats while being inspired by Russian composers such as Sergei Prokofiev and Dmitri Shostakovich, and Riddler has a sound reminiscent of old science fiction B-movies with a theremin. On the U2 single "Hold Me, Thrill Me, Kiss Me, Kill Me", there is a track titled "Themes from Batman Forever" composed by Goldenthal; this can also be found on the expanded release issued in 2012.

== Track listing ==
1. "Main Titles & Fanfare" – 1:50
2. "Perpetuum Mobile" – 0:54
3. "The Perils of Gotham" – 3:01
4. "Chase Noir" – 1:45
5. "Fledermausmarschmusik" – 1:15
6. "Nygma Variations (An Ode to Science)" – 6:02
7. "Victory" – 2:37
8. "Descent" – 1:07
9. "The Pull of Regret" – 2:50
10. "Mouth to Mouth Nocturne" – 2:14
11. "Gotham City Boogie" – 2:02
12. "Under the Top" – 5:42
13. "Mr. E's Dance Card (Rumba, Fox-trot, Waltz & Tango)" – 3:21
14. "Two-Face Three Step" – 2:20
15. "Chase Blanc" – 1:23
16. "Spank Me! Overture" – 2:46
17. "Holy Rusted Metal" – 1:51
18. "Batterdammerung" – 1:21

=== Expanded score ===
La-La Land Records released Elliot Goldenthal's expanded score to Batman Forever on January 1, 2012.

Disc One: The Score

1. "Main Title"* - 1:54
2. "Batmobile*/Introducing Two-Face"* - 1:39
3. "Thug Fight"* - 0:55
4. "Obligatory Car Chase"* - 2:40
5. "Nygma's Cubicle*/Bat-Signal"* - 3:22
6. "Capsule"* - 1:07
7. "Rooftop Seduction*/Roof Plunge"* - 2:05
8. "Nygma After Hours*/Brain Drain*/You Are Terminated"* - 4:52
9. "Suicide*/First Riddle*/Second Riddle Delivered"* - 4:14
10. "Dream Doll"* - 2:23
11. "Big Top Bomb"* - 4:19
12. "Circus Opening*/The Flying Graysons*/Death Drop"* - 3:41
13. "Flashback*/Signal*/Robin's Lament"* - 4:00
14. "Have a Safe Flight*/Through the Eye"* - 5:57
15. "Nygma's Apartment*/Two-Face's Lair*/Riddler's Entrance*/Schizoid Stomp*/Brain Drain Expo*/Heist Montage"* - 6:04
16. "Laundry Room Stunt"* - 0:25
17. "More Heists*/Third Riddle*/Nosy Robin"* - 1:06
18. "Building Nygmatech*/Family of Zombies"* - 1:29
19. "Master Dick"* - 0:56
20. "Memories Repressed*/Love"* - 2:34
21. "Alley Rumble**/Screen Kiss"* - 1:38
22. "Batcave*/Nygmatech Tango*/Public Demo" -* 4:39
23. "Nygma & Chase Dance"* - 1:16
24. "Two-Face's Entrance*/Batman's Entrance"* - 2:50
25. "Gas Trap*/Batman Phoenix"* - 2:30
26. "Gratitude Problem"* - 1:33
27. "Go to Chase"* - 2:16
28. "Batcave Closeout*/Dick Leaves Wayne Manor"* - 1:24

Disc One Time: 74:54

Disc Two

The Score (continued)

1. "Happy Halloween*/The Bat*/Love Scene*/Twick or Tweat*/Seize and Capture*" 7:08
2. "Riddles Solved*/Partners*/Battleship*" 6:21
3. "Scuba Fight*/Claw Island*/Emperor of Madness*" 5:10
4. "Fun and Games"* 3:07
5. "Batterdammerung" 1:20
6. "Two-Face's Demise"* 1:47
7. "Bat Descent*/Arkham Asylum"* 1:00
8. "Wet Screen Kiss*/March On!"* 1:22

Bonus Tracks

9. "Themes from Batman Forever (B-Side Single)" 3:39
10. "More Heists* (alternate)" 0:39

Original Soundtrack Album (Remastered)

11. "Main Titles & Fanfare" – 1:52
12. "Perpetuum Mobile" – 0:55
13. "The Perils of Gotham" – 2:58
14. "Chase Noir" – 1:45
15. "Fledermausmarschmusik" – 1:14
16. "Nygma Variations (An Ode to Science)" – 6:03
17. "Victory" – 2:38
18. "Descent" – 1:07
19. "The Pull of Regret" – 2:49
20. "Mouth to Mouth Nocturne" – 2:16
21. "Gotham City Boogie" – 2:02
22. "Under the Top" – 5:40
23. "Mr. E's Dance Card (Rumba, Fox-trot, Waltz & Tango)" – 3:20
24. "Two-Face Three Step" – 2:19
25. "Chase Blanc" – 1:23
26. "Spank Me! Overture" – 2:46
27. "Holy Rusted Metal" – 1:52
28. "Batterdammerung" – 1:20

Disc Two Time: 76:35

Total Album Time: 151:29

(*) Previously Unreleased

(**) "Wreckage and Rape" from Alien 3 (Elliot Goldenthal)

== Personnel ==
- Music composed by Elliot Goldenthal
- Music produced by Matthias Gohl
- Orchestrated by Elliot Goldenthal, Shirley Walker and Robert Elhai
- Conducted by Jonathan Sheffer and Shirley Walker
- Recorded by Steve McLaughlin at Sony and Todd AO, CA
- Mixed and edited by Joel Iwataki at Chapel Studios, CA
- Electronic music produced by Richard Martinez
- Music editors: Christopher Brooks and Joey Rand
