= Alien 3 (disambiguation) =

Alien 3 is a 1992 film by David Fincher and the third film in the Aliens/Xenomorph/Alien film series.

Alien 3 or Aliens III may also refer to:

- Alien 3 (soundtrack), a 1992 film soundtrack album for the 1992 David Fincher film, also called "Aliens 3"
- Alien 3 (novel), a 1992 novelization by Allen Dean Foster of the 1992 David Fincher film; see List of Alien (franchise) novels
- Alien 3 (comics), a 1992 comic book adaptation by Dark Horse Comics of the 1992 David Fincher film; see List of Alien (franchise) comics
- Alien 3 (video game), a 1992 video game, movie-tie-in to the 1992 David Fincher film
- Alien 3: The Gun (video game), a 1993 rail-shooter arcade game, movie-tie-in to the 1992 David Fincher film
- Alien III (script), an unused movie script written by William Gibson, for the third film in the Aliens/Xenomorph/Alien film series
  - Alien III: An Audible Original (drama), a 2019 audio drama directed by Dirk Maggs in the Aliens/Xenomorph/Alien franchise of the unused script by William Gibson
  - Alien III: The Unproduced Script (novel), a 2021 novelization by Pat Cadigan of the unused script by William Gibson; see List of Alien (franchise) novels
  - William Gibson's Alien III (comics), a 2018 comic book adaptation by Dark Horse Comics of the unused William Gibson script; see List of Alien (franchise) comics

== See also ==
- Alien (disambiguation)
