= Cobb (soundtrack) =

Soundtrack album by Elliot Goldenthal
- Released: January 3, 1995
- Genre: Blues, Gospel, classical, Avant-garde, modernist, electronic
- Length: 38:52
- Label: Sony Classical; SK 66923
- Producer: Matthias Gohl

Elliot Goldenthal chronology
Interview with the Vampire (1994)	Cobb (1995)	Batman Forever (1995)

The score to the film Cobb by Elliot Goldenthal was released in 1994.

== The score ==
Goldenthal himself can be heard performing the guttural vocals on the opening cue, a Baptist hymn of the sort Cobb had heard as a young child. This can be heard below.

Goldenthal's feelings on the score:

Ty Cobb's classical, scientific approach to baseball both collided and cohabited with his irrational, almost transcendent abandon in the game. These opposing forces in him gave me the key to composing the score: composition as collision. This is most clearly heard in the "Variations on an Old Baptist Hymn," where the earthy and crude Gospel vocals contrast with the contained eloquence of classical musicianship, and in the "Georgia Peach Rag", where sunny moderato ragtime piano seems to be swallowed up by orchestral anarchy.

== Reception ==
Professional ratings
Review scores
Source	Rating
Allmusic	4/5 stars
Movie-wave	4.5/5 stars

Allmusic wrote that "What could have amounted to little more than a giant mess is in fact Goldenthal's most sophisticated and ambitious score to date..."

== Track listing ==
1. Variations on an Old Baptist Hymn (3:05)
2. Stump Meets Cobb (1:50)
3. Cooperstown Aria (Part I) (1:43)
4. Nevada Nightlight (2:28)
5. Reno Ho' (Part I) (2:37)
6. Newsreel Mirror (3:26)
7. Meant Monk (2:17)
8. Cooperstown Aria (Part II) (2:00)
9. Winter Walk (1:11)
10. Hart and Hunter (1:16)
11. Georgia Peach Rag (1:30)
12. The Baptism (1:30)
13. Reno Ho' (Part II) (2:35)
14. The Homecoming (6:18)
15. Sour Mash Scherzo (1:09)
16. Cobb Dies (1:49)
17. The Beast Within (2:24) - (from "Alien³ soundtrack")
18. The Ball Game - Sister Wynona Carr (2:24)

== Audio ==
"Variations on an Old Baptist Hymn"
Sample of "Variations on an Old Baptist Hymn" from the album Cobb.

This track features vocals by Goldenthal.

"Georgia Peach Rag"
Sample of "Georgia Peach Rag" from the album Cobb.

This track exemplifies the duality of the score.

"Reno Ho' (Part II)"
Sample of "Reno Ho' (Part II)" from the album Cobb.

Typical Goldenthalian brass and horns dominate this track.

== Credits ==
- Music Composed by Elliot Goldenthal (except track 18)
- Music Produced by Matthias Gohl
- Orchestrated by Robert Elhai and Elliot Goldenthal
- Conducted by Jonathan Sheffer
- Recorded and Mixed by Joel Iwataki
- Electronic Music Produced by Richard Martinez
- Music Editors: Dan Carlin
