= Eleemosynary =

Eleemosynary may refer to:

- Eleemosynary, relating to charity or the giving of alms
- Eleemosynary (play), by Lee Blessing (1985)
