= True (magazine) =

1937–1975 American magazine

- Categories: Men's magazine
- Frequency: Monthly
- Publisher: Fawcett Publications (1937–1974)
- Founded: 1937
- Final issue: 1975
- Country: United States
- Based in: New York City
- Language: English

True, also known as True, The Man's Magazine, was published by Fawcett Publications from 1937 until 1974. Known as True, A Man's Magazine in the 1930s, it was labeled True, #1 Man's Magazine in the 1960s. Petersen Publishing took over with the January 1975, issue. It was sold to Magazine Associates in August 1975, and ceased publication shortly afterward.

High adventure, sports profiles and dramatic conflicts were highlighted in articles such as "Living and Working at Nine Fathoms" by Ed Batutis, "Search for the Perfect Beer" by Bob McCabe and the uncredited "How to Start Your Own Hunting-Fishing Lodge." In addition to pictorials ("Iceland, Unexpected Eden" by Lawrence Fried) and humor pieces ("The Most Unforgettable Sonofabitch I Ever Knew" by Robert Ruark), there were columns, miscellaneous features and regular concluding pages: "This Funny Life," "Man to Man Answers," "Strange But True" and "True Goes Shopping."

== Editors ==
Donald Ayres "Bill" Williams became associated with Fawcett Publications in 1941, serving first as editor of Mechanix Illustrated. He became editor of True from 1944–48. He wrote columns in True called “The Editor Speaks” or “Thus Spake Bill Williams.” He signed off on the True columns as B. Wms. He died 12 Dec. 1948 in his New York apartment at age 43 from a heart ailment. Source: UP press release Dec. 13, 1948.

American journalist Michael Stern published his interview with the Italian bandit Salvatore Giuliano in True magazine in 1947. In the early 1950s, when Ken Purdy was True's editor, Newsweek described it "a man's magazine with a class all its own, and the largest circulation of the bunch." A prolific contributor to Playboy and other magazines, automobile writer Purdy (Kings of the Road), was the son of W. T. Purdy, the composer of "On, Wisconsin!".

During the 1960s, True was edited by Douglas S. Kennedy. Robert Shea, co-author of The Illuminatus! Trilogy, was an associate editor from 1963 to 1965 before he moved on to Cavalier and Playboy. Charles N. Barnard and Mark Penzer edited True during the 1970s. The cover price in 1963 was 35 cents, climbing to 50 cents by 1965 and 60 cents in 1970. Fawcett also did special issues, such as True's Baseball Yearbook, True's Football Yearbook, published annually from 1963 to 1972, and True's Boxing Yearbook. True's various spin-offs included calendars, such as George Petty's True Magazine Petty Girl Calendar for 1948, published by Fawcett in 1947.

== Books ==
In January 1950, True went back to press after a sold-out issue in which Donald E. Keyhoe suggested that extraterrestrials could be piloting flying saucers. The material was reworked by Keyhoe into a best-selling paperback book, The Flying Saucers Are Real (Fawcett Gold Medal, 1950). True did follow-up UFO reports in 1967 and 1969. Frank Bowers edited The True Report on Flying Saucers (1967).

The magazine was the source for a number of other books, including True, A Treasury of True: The Best from 20 Years of the Man's Magazine (Barnes, 1956), edited by Charles N. Barnard and illustrated by Carl Pfeufer, and Bar Guide (Fawcett, 1950) by Ted Shane and Virgil Partch. Cartoon collections included Cartoon Laffs from True, the Man's Magazine (Crest Books, 1958), True Album of Cartoons (Fawcett, 1960), Cartoon Treasury (Fawcett, 1968) and New Cartoon Laughs: A Prize Collection from True Magazine (Fawcett, 1970).

== Television ==
GE True, a 1962–63 television series filmed at Warner Bros. Studios in Burbank for CBS, featured stories based on the magazine's articles. Jack Webb was the executive producer, host and narrator.

The Main Library at the University of Illinois at Urbana–Champaign has a lengthy run of True back issues.

== In popular culture ==
A feature in Mad Magazine titled "When Advertising Takes Over Magazines Completely" depicted a True cover story with the headline "A Night of Terror in the Valley of the Jolly Green Giant."

"The Last Days of Ty Cobb" by sportswriter Al Stump, which appeared in an issue of True in 1961, coincided with an autobiography of baseball great Ty Cobb published that year that the two men had collaborated on during the last months of Cobb's life. Decades later, the film Cobb, which starred Tommy Lee Jones, showed the conflicted Stump torn between writing Cobb's story the way his subject wanted it or a version that portrayed Cobb much more negatively.

== Selections from True ==
- "One Man Air Force" (June 1944), by Christian Gilbert
- The Flying Saucers Are Real (1950), by Donald Keyhoe
- "The Sky-High Invention" (Sep. 1956), by John DuBarry
- "A New Look at America's Mystery Giant" (Mar. 1960), by Ivan T. Sanderson
- "You'd Better Not Call Them Toys" (May 1951), by Charles N. Barnard
