= Golden Gate (film) =

- Theatrical Poster
- Directed by: John Madden
- Written by: David Henry Hwang
- Produced by: Michael Brandman
- Starring: Matt Dillon; Joan Chen; Bruno Kirby
- Edited by: Sean Barton
- Music by: Elliot Goldenthal
- Distributed by: The Samuel Goldwyn Company; American Playhouse Theatrical Films
- Release date: January 28, 1994
- Running time: 95 minutes
- Country: United States
- Language: English
- Box office: $395,105 (USA)

Golden Gate is a 1994 American drama film produced by American Playhouse. Set in San Francisco, California, it tells the story of a 1950s G-Man (played by Matt Dillon) who ends up in the Federal Bureau of Investigation's Communist prosecutions, which leads him to become involved with a young Chinese American woman (played by Joan Chen) whose father he helped to put in prison. The film also features Bruno Kirby and Tzi Ma. The film is directed by John Madden and written by Asian American dramatist David Henry Hwang.

The film is available on videocassette and DVD.

== Plot ==
In 1952, 22-year-old Kevin David Walker is a promising graduating law student, who becomes an agent of the FBI in the San Francisco branch. Under the lasting impact of the Second Red Scare and the rise of Maoism in China, Kevin is assigned to investigate San Franciscan Chinatown resident activities to root out sympathizers with the newly Communist Chinese state.

While vigilantly on patrol and on the course of a promising life with his lover, Cynthia, Kevin and his partner Ron Pirelli come across money transfers from a local laundry to Hong Kong by three Chinese American workers, and under vague suspicions that they may be involved with the Chinese Communist Party. Though the evidence is not sound and there is a push to crack down hard on communist activities to make examples of for public peace of mind, Kevin is at a moral dilemma, as while the charges can be a boost for his career and to uphold the law, the charges are trumped up and Cynthia is appalled at the actions the FBI is willing to take to fight communist influence. Kevin ultimately gives into pressing the charges at the berating of his superior and being goaded by appeal of nationalism upon trying to officially drop the case, which sends the three men to prison on indictment. While celebrating the success of their case with Ron, Cynthia ultimately breaks up with him for not doing the just thing. In grief over a disappeared Cynthia, a mysterious Chinese girl comes over to him to wipe his tears.

Ten years later in 1962, Kevin continues his career as an FBI agent, while Ron is eventually promoted to become the new head of the San Francisco branch. As the three men from the case in 1952 are released from prison, Ron orders Kevin to continue surveillance on Chen Jung Song, who is considered the "ringleader" of the trio. All throughout his surveillance, Chen suffers from poor public face throughout Chinatown, being denied a raise in pay at his old laundromat, and is shunned by the Chinese American community. While witnessing a vaguely evocative woman crying atop the apartment complex, Chen then revolts in madness in the streets, and is pursued by Kevin to the Golden Gate Bridge, who, overcome by guilt, offers to try and help the now despondent Chen. Upset and in anger at the man who unjustly sent him to prison, Chen curses Kevin to "become a Chinaman", before committing suicide by leaping over the Golden Gate Memorial.

Kevin, walking back to the Chinatown neighborhood, comes across the Chinese woman who was on the roof and consoling Chen before his death. At first with resistance, not revealing who he really is, Kevin introduces himself to the woman, who reveals herself to be Marilyn Song, the daughter of Chen Jung Song. Initially coming over to see how she is faring after her father's death, eventually, a romantic relationship develops between Kevin and Marilyn. Kevin eventually comes to earnestly learn a greater deal of the culture of the community he's been tasked to enforce over the years, allowing Marilyn to warm up greater to him. However, upon revealing he is the FBI agent who sent Marilyn's father to prison, Marilyn ultimately deserts him, and Kevin comes to spiral greater into grief over the consequences of his actions.

Six years later in 1968, Kevin is assigned a new partner, Agent Byrd, and is tasked with the job of keeping watch on prolific pro-minority race revolutionary groups by the then dean of UC Berkeley and by orders of Ron and J. Edgar Hoover, specifically the Pro Asian Empowerment Movement, headed by Japanese American Bradley Ichiyasu, and whose members also includes Marilyn Song, who is considered a powerfully influential member of the group for her history and is romantically involved with Ichiyasu. Walker merely goes to incarcerate Ichiyasu to disband the Pro Asian Empowerment Movement, but able to make bail by his rich parents and with only charges of marijuana possession, Hoover demands Ron to arrest Marilyn Song upon seeing her on TV to use her influence to release Ichiyasu and cause civil unrest. Further disillusioned by the prolific racism within the FBI and its under current of pro-white supremacist rhetoric, and knowing well that his actions have come full circle, Kevin refuses, and upon being dismissed from the case by Ron, goes to make the ultimate sacrifice for Marilyn and in repentance for his actions. Able to retrieve the case files, and at an on campus riot, Walker engages Ichiyasu, giving him the files able to redeem Marilyn's father from unfounded shame, and disposing of the evidence found on him, freeing him and Marilyn from the FBI's watching eyes.

At the same spot where Cynthia left him, Kevin meets Marilyn again, who hopes to save him from legal reprimand and charges by his superiors by giving him the files back. Unwilling to take back the case file, Kevin and Marilyn embrace a final time, and express their love for one another despite crossed stars and fate. After being fiercely interrogated by Ron and his superiors as news of Chen's innocence becomes nationwide, and weary of the world, Kevin walks back to the same place where Chen committed suicide. As Marilyn monologues, Kevin tried to leave the world the same way as her father did, but for his selfless devotion to redeem himself and sacrifice to save the life of Marilyn, Kevin was merely spirited away by Guanyin into heaven as a xian into her mercy.

== Cast ==
- Matt Dillon as Agent Kevin David Walker
- Joan Chen as Marilyn Song
- Bruno Kirby as Agent Ron Pirelli
- Teri Polo as Cynthia
- Tzi Ma as Chen Jung Song
- Stan Egi as Bradley Ichiyasu
- Jack Shearer as FBI Chief
- Peter Murnik as Agent Byrd
- George Guidall as Professor "Buck" Meisner
- Keone Young as Benny Ying

== Production ==
Filmed between December 7, 1992 and February 9, 1993 in San Francisco, with additional scenes at UC Berkeley.

== Reception ==
The film received mostly negative reviews. In The Austin Chronicle, critic Marjorie Baumgarten wrote,

Screenwriter David Henry Hwang (M. Butterfly) never arrives at a consistent tone for his story. At times, it almost feels like a shadow play that threatens to turn comic. Especially during the early Fifties settings, there's a certain quality that makes it feel almost like a parody of the period it is portraying. Director [John] Madden (Ethan Frome) is no big help on this score as characters trudge along toward their inevitable destinies with no sizable input or control visible from his end. Golden Gate means to tell a sensitive little period story about an interracial love story but it drowns itself in good intentions.

=== Year-end lists ===
- Top 10 worst (alphabetical order, not ranked) – William Arnold, Seattle Post-Intelligencer
- Top 10 worst (not ranked) – Dan Webster, The Spokesman-Review

== See also ==
- Golden Gate (soundtrack)
