= Whores (play) =

2003 American play

- Written by: Lee Blessing
- Genre: Black comedy

Premiere
- Date: 2003
- Directed by: John Pietrowski

Whores is a 2003 black comedy play by Lee Blessing.

== Premise ==
The play takes place in the hallucinating mind of Raoul de Raoul, a fictional general of a Central American country now living in Florida after receiving amnesty for atrocities committed under his command. Four women raped and murdered by his death squad play various roles in Raoul's imagination, including family members, escorts, and lawyers.

The play was based on the 1980 murders of U.S. missionaries in El Salvador who were beaten, raped, and murdered by members of the El Salvador National Guard, which was armed and supported by the United States. Raoul de Raoul was based on Carlos Eugenio Vides Casanova, former head of the Salvadoran national guard.

The play criticizes Central American dictatorships, the foreign policy of the United States that supported the dictatorships, and the Roman Catholic Church.

== Cast ==
- Jonathan Cantor as Raoul
- Corinne Edgerly as Carmencita
- Lily Mercer as Angelique
- Carol Todd as Josette
- Lea Eckert as Miou-Miou

== Reception ==
Robert L. Daniels of Variety criticized the play an "abstract, sloppy satire" and a "a blatant display of tastelessness". Simon Saltzman of CurtainUp called the play "circuitous and seriously lost in tasteless charades and obscenities". Talkin Broadway's Bob Rendell praised the play's themes, writing that Blessing was "unflinching in his hatred of what he sees as an immoral America whose foreign policy is to support, train and arm vicious dictators who slaughter and terrorize their own people" and that he made "a very strong case for his views". Neil Genzlinger of the New York Times described the play as funny but "unpleasant to watch".
