= Demolition Man (soundtrack) =

Demolition Man: The Original Orchestral Score

Soundtrack album by Elliot Goldenthal
- Released: November 23, 1993
- Genre: Classical, Avant-garde, modernist, electronic
- Length: 30:03
- Label: Varèse Sarabande, Cat. VSD-5447
- Producer: Matthias Gohl

Elliot Goldenthal chronology
Alien 3 (1992)	Demolition Man: The Original Orchestral Score (1993)	Golden Gate (1994)

Elliot Goldenthal scored the soundtrack Demolition Man: The Original Orchestral Score for the movie Demolition Man. It is an example of his off-beat style and use of unconventional techniques in film score, incorporating big brass clashes and complex, dramatic string arrangements.

It won Goldenthal an ASCAP award in 1994 for best original score and was his first big budget action film score.

== Track listing ==
1. "Dies Irae" – 1:51
2. "Fire Fight" – 1:35
3. "Guilty as Charged" – 3:58
4. "Action, Guns, Fun" – 1:26
5. "Machine Waltz" – 1:56
6. "Defrosting" – 1:43
7. "Confronting the Chief" – 0:32
8. "Museum Dis Duel" – 1:56
9. "Subterranean Slugfest" – 1:44
10. "Meeting Coctaeu" – 1:42
11. "Tracking Simon Phoenix" – 3:03
12. "Obligatory Car Chase" – 3:06
13. "Flawless Pearl" – 1:15
14. "Final Confrontation" – 1:55
15. "Code 187" – 0:41
16. "Silver Screen Kiss" – 1:30

== Crew/Credit ==
- Music Composed by Elliot Goldenthal
- Music Produced by Matthias Gohl
- Orchestrated by Elliot Goldenthal and Robert Elhai
- Conducted by Jonathan Sheffer / Additional: Artie Kane
- Recorded by Steve McLaughlin and Bobby Fernandez
- Mixed by Steve McLaughlin and Joel Iwataki
- Additional Orchestrations by David John Olsen and Lolita Ritmanis

== Reception ==
Professional ratings
Review scores
Source	Rating
Allmusic	4/5 stars
Filmtracks	2/5 stars
Musicfromthemovies	4/5 stars
Movie-wave.net	4/5 stars
Soundtrack-express	4/5 stars
