= Fortinbras =

Character in Hamlet

Prince Fortinbras
- Hamlet character
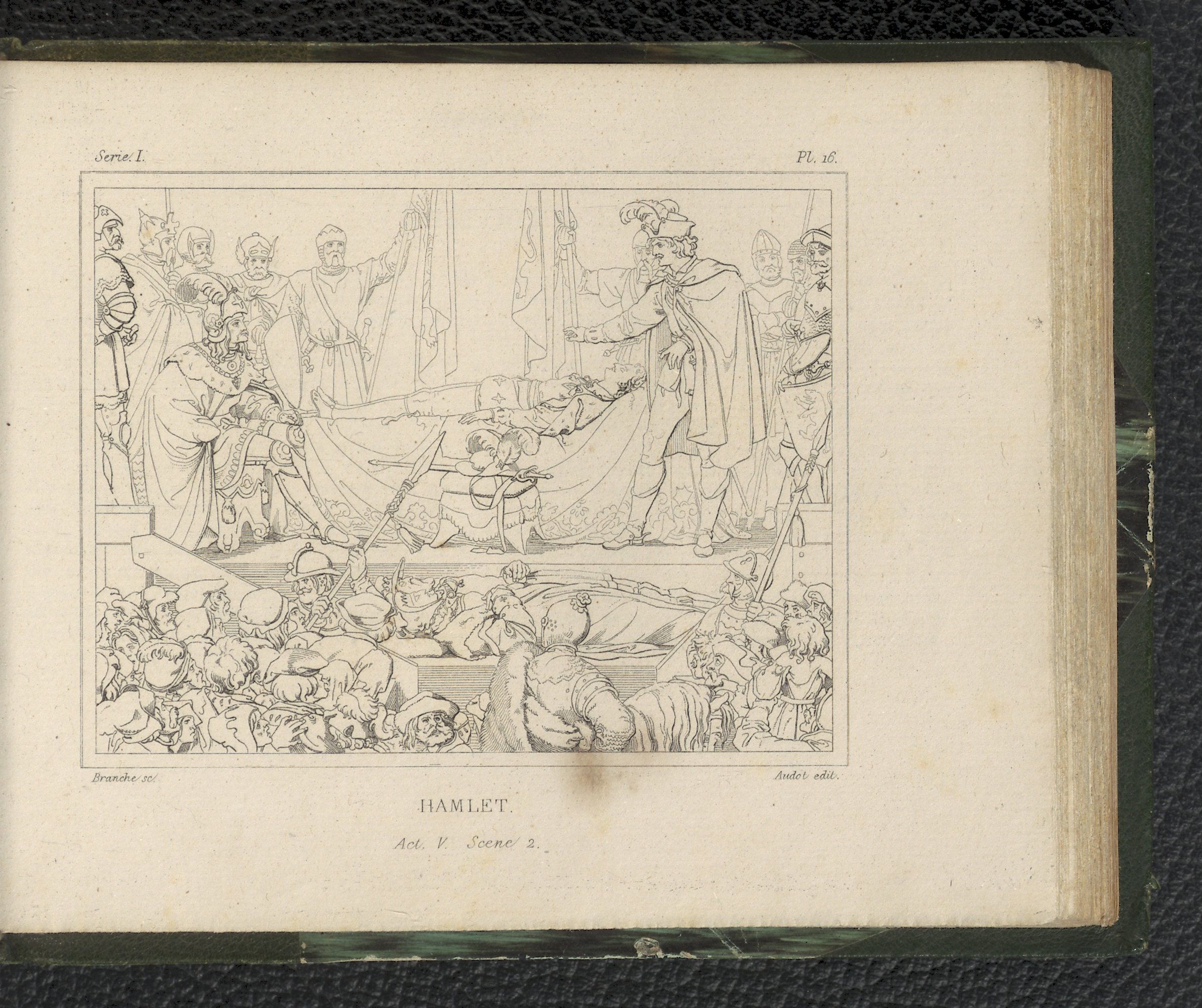
- 1828 illustration of Fortinbras (at far right) giving instructions for the funeral of Hamlet
- Created by: William Shakespeare
- Portrayed by: Fritz Achterberg; Rufus Sewell; Michael Ebert; Casey Affleck; Ian Charleson

In-universe information
- Title(s): Crown Prince of Norway; King of Denmark (at the end of the play)
- Family: King Fortinbras (father)
- Nationality: Norwegian

Fortinbras /ˈfɔːrtɪnbræs/, also called Young Fortinbras to distinguish him from his father, is a minor fictional character from William Shakespeare's tragedy Hamlet. A Norwegian crown prince with a few brief scenes in the play, he delivers the final lines that represent a hopeful future for the monarchy of Denmark and its subjects. His father, the fictional former king of Norway, is also named Fortinbras and was slain in the play's antecedent action in a duel with King Hamlet. The duel between the two is described by Horatio in Act One, Scene One (I,i) of the play.

His name is not Norwegian in origin, but is a French–English hybrid (fort in bras) meaning "strong in arm."

== Role in the play ==
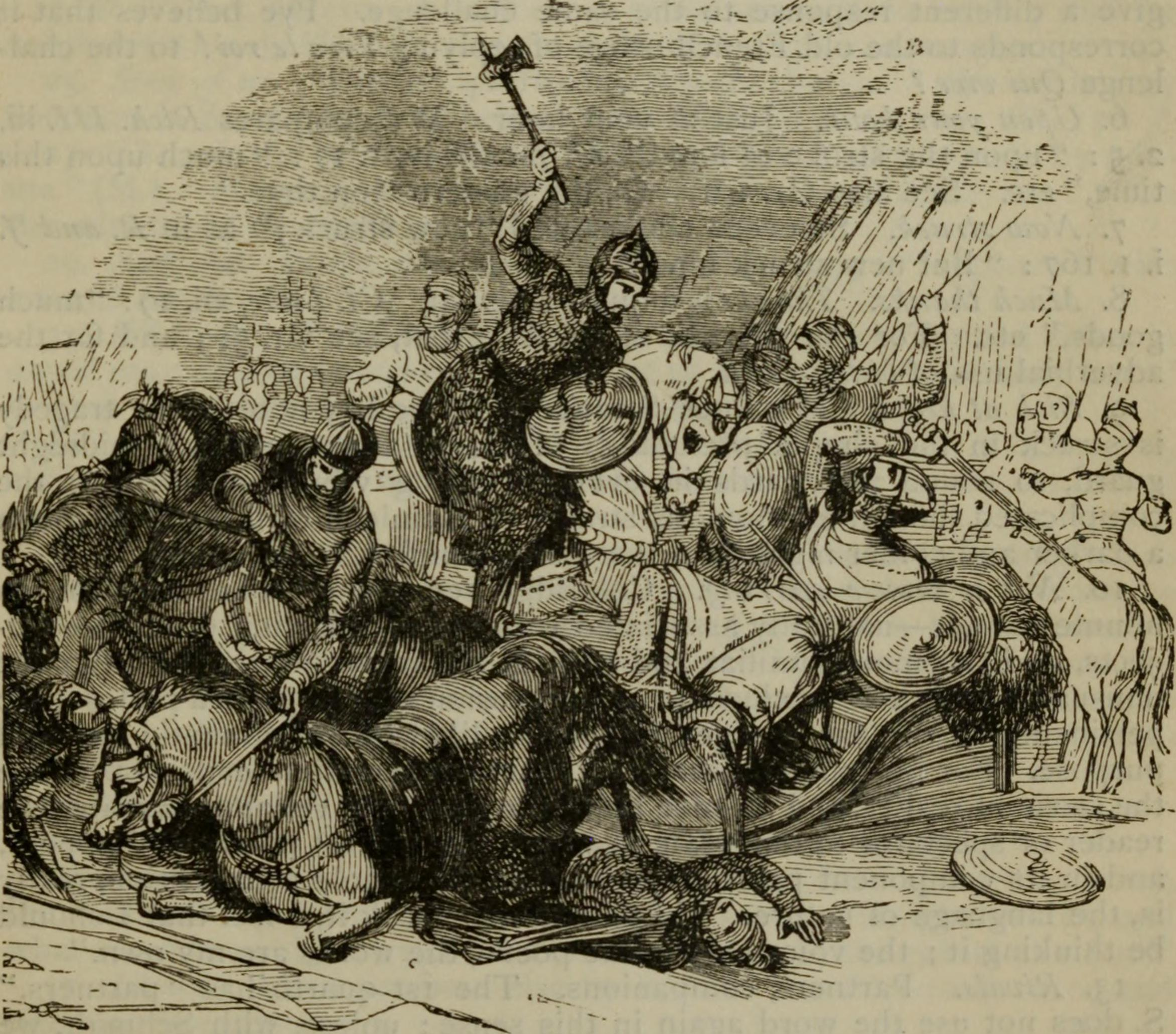
Depiction of King Hamlet defeating Fortinbras' father, when he "smote the sledded Polacks (or pole-axe?) on the ice." (1890 engraving)

Although Fortinbras makes only two brief appearances in the latter half of the play, he is referred to throughout: King Claudius sends ambassadors to Norway in the hopes of staving off his invasion, and they return with the news that Fortinbras will attack Poland but leave Denmark alone. At the end—after all the major characters except Horatio are dead—Fortinbras and his army enter, accompanied by ambassadors from England who have come to announce that Claudius' supposed orders to execute Rosencrantz and Guildenstern have been carried out. With the throne of Denmark now vacant, Fortinbras may be crowned ruler. This may be an allusion to the political situation of the day: at the time the play was written, Denmark and Norway were united under a single crown; also, England itself was to be ruled by King James I of England and James VI of Scotland, who claimed the throne by virtue of his blood relation to Elizabeth I (the play was written before Elizabeth I's death).

Fortinbras also serves as a parallel to Hamlet in many ways: like the latter, he is motivated largely by the death of his father, whose name he also bears (as Hamlet does his), and both serve as princes of their respective countries. In other respects, Fortinbras serves as a foil for Hamlet: while the Danish prince is deliberate and given to long-winded soliloquies, the Norwegian is impulsive and hot-headed, determined to avenge his slain father at any cost.

Fortinbras orders that Prince Hamlet be given a soldier's funeral, describing him as "likely, had he been put on, to have proved most royally."

== Screen adaptations ==
Hamlet, with a running time in the range of four hours, is seldom performed in its entirety. Consequently, the role of Fortinbras is sometimes omitted, as it was in the 1948 film starring Laurence Olivier, in the 1969 film starring Nicol Williamson, and the 1990 film starring Mel Gibson. He was included, however, in the 1921 Svend Gade and Heinz Schall directed German silent film Hamlet and portrayed by Fritz Achterberg, in the 1964 Broadway revival, which was later filmed as Richard Burton's Hamlet, in the 1980 BBC Shakespeare television production starring Derek Jacobi, in the 1996 film starring Kenneth Branagh and the 2000 film starring Ethan Hawke, although in the 2000 film, he is an enemy of business. In these films he was played by Michael Ebert, Ian Charleson, Rufus Sewell and Casey Affleck, respectively.

Fortinbras also appears in the 1964 BBC television Hamlet, starring Christopher Plummer, and here he was played by Donald Sutherland, in what was his first important role.

== Other stage adaptations ==
Fortinbras is the protagonist of the 1992 play Fortinbras by Lee Blessing. The plot of Fortinbras follows that of Hamlet; the first scene is the death of Hamlet in the original Shakespearean text. The rest of the play is in a vernacular, modern English. Major characters from Hamlet appear as ghosts in this sequel.

== Sources ==
- Blessing, Lee (1992). Fortinbras. Dramatists Play Service. ISBN 9780822204213.
- Drake, Sylvie (25 June 1991). "La Jolla Fortinbras Played for Laughs". Los Angeles Times.
