= Interview with the Vampire (soundtrack) =

1994 album by Elliot Goldenthal

Soundtrack album by Elliot Goldenthal
- Released: December 13, 1994
- Genre: Film music
- Length: 48:58
- Labels: Geffen; GEFSD 24719
- Producer: Matthias Gohl

Elliot Goldenthal chronology
Golden Gate (1994)	Interview with the Vampire (1994)	Cobb (1994)

Singles from Interview with the Vampire
- 1. "Sympathy for the Devil" Released: December 12, 1994

Professional ratings
Review scores
Source	Rating
AllMusic	2/5 stars
Filmtracks	3/5 stars
Musicfromthemovies	5/5 stars

Elliot Goldenthal scored the 1994 film Interview with the Vampire, working again with director and frequent collaborator Neil Jordan.

== The score ==
The music is characterized by its full, dramatic sound, which complements the film's gothic atmosphere. The classical style effectively conveys the characters' emotional state and essence, exemplified by Handel's Concerto No. 6 for Harp, which is heard in scenes depicting Claudia's early years as a vampire before she realizes she cannot age like her companions.

The rock band Guns N' Roses covered the Rolling Stones song "Sympathy for the Devil", which plays during the film's end credits. The song was released as a single CD, with "Escape to Paris" as a B-side.

The album was nominated for the Academy Award and the Golden Globe Award for Best Original Score, losing on both counts to the score of The Lion King.

== Track listing ==
1. "Libera Me" (2:47) - (Vocals: The American Boychoir)
2. "Born to Darkness Part I" (3:04)
3. "Lestat's Tarantella" (0:46)
4. "Madeleine's Lament" (3:06)
5. "Claudia's Allegro" Agitato (4:46)
6. "Escape to Paris" (3:09)
7. "Marche Funèbre" (1:50)
8. "Lestat's Recitative" (3:39)
9. "Santiago's Waltz" (0:37)
10. "Théâtre Des Vampires" (1:18)
11. "Armand's Seduction" (1:51)
12. "Plantation Pyre" (1:59)
13. "Forgotten Lore" (0:31)
14. "Scent of Death" (1:40)
15. "Abduction & Absolution" (4:42) - (Vocals: The American Boychoir)
16. "Armand Rescues Louis" (2:07)
17. "Louis' Revenge" (2:36)
18. "Born to Darkness Part II" (1:11)
19. "Sympathy for the Devil" (7:35) - (cover by Guns N' Roses)

== Personnel ==
- Music Composed by Elliot Goldenthal (except track 19)
- Music Produced by Matthias Gohl
- Orchestrated by Robert Elhai and Elliot Goldenthal
- Conducted by Jonathan Sheffer
- Recorded and Mixed by Steve McLaughlin and Joel Iwataki
- Electronic Music Produced by Richard Martinez
- Music Editors: Michael Connell and Chris Brooks
