= Pet Sematary (soundtrack) =

Soundtrack album by Elliot Goldenthal
- Released: 1989
- Genre: Classical, electronic, progressive
- Length: 27:39
- Label: Varèse Sarabande, Cat.VSD-5227
- Producer: Elliot Goldenthal

Elliot Goldenthal chronology
Drugstore Cowboy (1989)	Pet Sematary (1989)	Alien³ (1992)

Professional ratings
Review scores
Source	Rating
Allmusic	4/5 stars
Musicfromthemovies	4/5 stars

Pet Sematary is the soundtrack album for the 1989 film of the same name. Produced by Elliot Goldenthal, the album was released in 1989.

== Background ==
Elliot Goldenthal's Pet Sematary record was his first mainstream film score.

Its style is sometimes compared to Jack Nitzsche's soundtrack for The Exorcist, while the theme is inspired by Lalo Schifrin's score to The Amityville Horror.

== Track listing ==
1. "The Pet Sematary" (3:00)
2. "Dead Recollection" (1:19)
3. "Hope and Ordeal" (1:22)
4. "Adieu Gage" (1:22)
5. "Rachel Against Time" (0:49)
6. "The Return Game" (Jud and Gage) (3:42)
7. "Moving Day Waltz" (0:30)
8. "The Warning Tour" (1:41)
9. "Death Do Us Part" (Rachel Hugs Louis) (0:53)
10. "Nine Lives Minus Seven" (0:14)
11. "Up in Flames" (Flashback) (1:38)
12. "Bitter Loss" (Flashback) (1:51)
13. "Rachel's Dirty Secret" (0:22)
14. "Return Game Attack" (1:54)
15. "Rachel's Blow Out" (0:20)
16. "I Brought You Something Mommie" (0:34)
17. "The Return Game II" (Louis and Gage) (2:52)
18. "Gentle Exhuming" (1:03)
19. "To the Micmac Grounds" (2:45)
20. "Chorale" (0:29)
21. "Kite and Truck" (1:22)
22. "Immolation" (1:37)

== Personnel ==
- Music composed by Elliot Goldenthal
- Album produced by Elliot Goldenthal
- Orchestrated by Elliot Goldenthal and Robert Elhai
- Conducted by Steven Mercurio
- Performed by the Orchestra of St. Luke's
- Vocals performed by the Zarathustra Boys Chorus
- Recorded by Phil Bulla, Mixed by Joel Iwataki
- Synthesizer programming/supervision by Mathias Gohl
