= Al Stump =

American writer (1916–1995)

- Born: Alvin John Stump; October 20, 1916; Colorado Springs, Colorado, U.S.
- Died: December 14, 1995 (aged 79); Newport Beach, California, U.S.
- Education: University of Wisconsin
- Occupations: Sports writer, author
- Spouse: Jo Mosher (m. ?–1995)
- Children: 4

Alvin John Stump (October 20, 1916 – December 14, 1995), was an American author and sports writer. Stump spent time with Detroit Tigers' Hall of Fame baseball player Ty Cobb in 1960 and 1961, collaborating on Cobb's autobiography. My Life in Baseball: A True Record was released shortly after Cobb's death. From this research, Stump went on to write at least two books and at least one magazine article on Cobb.

Cobb: The Life and Times of the Meanest Man Who Ever Played Baseball and Cobb: A Biography were follow-up hit pieces written over 30 years after Cobb died. Both books, represented by Stump as a reflection on his time with Cobb, have been alleged to be sensationalized and, in large part, fictional.

== Early life and early career ==
Stump was born in Colorado Springs, Colorado. He began his sportswriting career while attending the University of Wisconsin. Stump became a war correspondent during World War II, after which he wrote about sports for True and Esquire magazines and worked as a reporter for the Los Angeles Herald-Examiner and the Los Angeles Times.

== Work with Cobb ==
Stump spent approximately three weeks with Ty Cobb over eleven months, researching the ballplayer's life. Cobb's autobiography that Stump coauthored, My Life in Baseball, came out a few months after Cobb's July 17, 1961, death and painted the former Tiger in a sympathetic light. Stump said afterward that he found Cobb difficult to work with most of the time. Long after the publication of Cobb's autobiography, he claimed that Cobb's editorial control over the autobiography resulted in the book not telling the truth about Cobb as Stump saw it. During a visit to the Cobb family mausoleum in December 1960, Stump alleged that Cobb told him about the murder of his father, and pointed the finger at his mother.

Thirty years later, however, Stump published a new book (Cobb: The Life and Times of the Meanest Man in Baseball), which offered a very negative portrait of Cobb. In 1994, this book was used as the basis for Cobb, a film starring Tommy Lee Jones as Cobb and Robert Wuhl as Stump. Critics lauded the film and Jones's performance, but the box office results for the film were underwhelming, grossing little over $1 million. Stump's 1996 book on Cobb, Cobb: A Biography, was a reworked and expanded version of the 1994 book, published after Stump's death.

== Accusations of forgery and falsifications ==
In 2010, an article by William R. Cobb in The National Pastime accused Al Stump of extensive forgeries of Cobb-related baseball and personal memorabilia, including personal documents and diaries. The article, and later expanded book, further accused Stump of numerous false statements about Cobb, not only during and immediately after their 1961 collaboration, but also in Stump's later years, most of which were sensationalist in nature and intended to cast Cobb in an unflattering light. Cobb goes on to claim that Stump's work "should be dismiss[ed] out of hand as untrue".

On a 2012 episode of Freakonomics Radio, sportswriter Charlie Leerhsen, who was working on a new biography of Cobb, agreed that Stump inserted sensational misconduct into Cobb's life story to generate good copy. According to Leehrsen, Stump's stories were accepted by a public enamored of the fictional Cobb created by Stump. Leehrsen further claimed Stump had been "banned from several newspapers and magazines for making things up." In a written response, Stump's son John argued that his father was accomplished and respected, and Cobb could be both offensive and admirable. He also could not see a motive or ability for Stump to commit the alleged forgeries.

== Death ==
On December 14, 1995, Stump died of congestive heart failure at Hoag Memorial Hospital in Newport Beach, California, at the age of 79. He and his wife, Jo Mosher, had four children.

== Articles and books by Stump ==
- The Spies: Great True Stories of Espionage (Fawcett Publications, 1949) with Bard Lindeman, Gene Caesar, Andrew St. George, Geoffrey Bocca, and Norman Moss
- Champions Against Odds (Macrae Smith, 1952)
- My Life In Baseball: A True Record (New York: Doubleday, 1961) ghost-written with Ty Cobb
- "Ty Cobb's Wild 10-Month Fight To Live" (True-The Man's Magazine, December 1961)
- "He Parachutes With One Leg – A Marines Fight To Stay In The Corps" (Saga Magazine, Macfadden-Bartell Corp, NY, January 1, 1964)
- The Education Of A Golfer (Crest, 1964) with Sam Snead
- The Champion Breed: The True, Behind-the-Scene Struggles of Sport's Greatest Champions (Bantam, 1969)
- Cobb: The Life and Times of the Meanest Man Who Ever Played Baseball (Chapel Hill, NC: Algonquin Books of Chapel Hill, 1994)
- Cobb: A Biography (Chapel Hill, N.C.: Algonquin, 1996)
