= Golden Gate (soundtrack) =

Soundtrack album by Elliot Goldenthal
- Released: March 1, 1994
- Genre: Classical, romantic, jazz fusion
- Length: 31:25
- Label: Varèse Sarabande, Cat.VSD-5470
- Producer: Matthias Gohl

Elliot Goldenthal chronology
Demolition Man (1993)	Golden Gate (1994)	Interview with the Vampire (1994)

Professional ratings
Review scores
Source	Rating
Allmusic	2/5 stars
Filmtracks	3/5 stars
Musicfromthemovies	3/5 stars

The Golden Gate score was composed by Elliot Goldenthal in 1993 and released in 1994 for the film Golden Gate.

== Track listing ==
1. "Golden Gate" (03:34)
2. "The Women Cries" (03:33)
3. "Between Bridge and Water" (01:54)
4. "Tender Deception" (03:34)
5. "Bopathonix Hex" (02:48)
6. "The Woman Warrior" (02:30)
7. "The Softest Heart" (03:45)
8. "The Moon Watches" (01:43)
9. "Whisper Dance" (01:51)
10. "Kwan Ying" (02:47)
11. "Motel Street Meltdown" (01:24)
12. "Judgement on Mason Street" (02:03)
13. "Write It As Time" (00:28)
14. "Between Bridge and Sky" (02:51)

== Crew/credit ==
- Music composed by Elliot Goldenthal
- Music produced by Matthias Gohl
- Orchestrated by Elliot Goldenthal and Robert Elhai
- Conducted by Jonathan Sheffer
- Recorded and mixed by Steve McLaughlin and Bill Emmons
