= Black Sheep (play) =

Play

Black Sheep is a 2001 play by American playwright Lee Blessing. It concerns a black man raised by a wealthy white family who returns home after being released from prison for shooting his half-brother.

== Production history ==
Black Sheep had a public reading at Washington, D.C.'s Arena Stage from October 19–27, 2001. In December 14 of the same year Florida Stage in Manalapan, Florida staged the world premiere, while Blessing was still tinkering with the script. The premiere closed as scheduled on January 20, 2002.
