= The Scottish Play (Lee Blessing play) =

The Scottish Play is a play by American playwright Lee Blessing. It is set at a Shakespeare festival in Bannockburn, Michigan and examines the history of the Scottish Play curse associated with theater workers and performers pronouncing the name Macbeth.
