= A Walk in the Woods (play) =

Play written by Lee Blessing

- Original language: English
- Written by: Lee Blessing
- Genre: Drama
- Setting: Woods above Geneva, Switzerland

Premiere
- Date: 1988
- Place: United States

A Walk in the Woods is a 1988 play by Lee Blessing. The play depicts the developing relationship between two arms limitation negotiators, one Russian and one American, over a year of negotiations.

== Productions ==
A Walk in the Woods was first presented at the Yale Repertory Theater, New Haven, Connecticut, in March 1987. Directed by Des McAnuff the cast starred Josef Sommer as the Russian Andrey Botvinnik, and Kenneth Welsh as the American John Honeyman. It was next produced at the La Jolla Playhouse, California, in July 1987, directed by McAnuff and starring Lawrence Pressman (as John Honeyman) and Michael Constantine (as Andrey Botvinnik).

A Walk in the Woods premiered on Broadway at the Booth Theatre on February 10, 1988, in previews, officially on February 28, 1988, and closed on June 26, 1988, after 21 previews and 137 performances. Directed by Des McAnuff, the cast starred Robert Prosky as Andrey Botvinnik and Sam Waterston as John Honeyman.

The play was presented at the Westport Country Playhouse, Connecticut, in September 1988. Directed by Maureen F. Gibson, the cast starred Lawrence Pressman (as John Honeyman) and Michael Constantin (as Andrey Botvinnik).

The play was produced in the West End at the Comedy Theatre in November 1988. The cast starred Alec Guinness (Andrey Botvinnik) and Edward Herrmann (John Honeyman), directed by Ronald Eyre.

The play was produced Off-Broadway by the Keen Company at The Clurman Theatre at Theatre Row in September 2014. The cast starred Paul Niebanck (John Honeyman) and Kathleen Chalfant (as Irina Botvinnik), directed by Jonathan Silverstein. Blessing commented on changing the character of the Soviet diplomat from a man to a woman: "I've formally been asked for my approval to change the gender of one or the other negotiator in this play four times, that I recall. In each case I gave it....I think the gender change can wake us up a bit more to a play that discusses issues that have not been on the front burner (in quite this way at least) for decades. It reminds us that more and more women are finding their way into our society's biggest socio-political discussions." The character of the Soviet diplomat had previously been played by a woman, in the production at the Northern Stage in Vermont, which transferred to London at the Tricycle Theatre in October 2011. Press materials for this production stated "the director's decision to cast a woman in the role keeps the production topical, reflecting the more recent appointments of women such as Madeleine Albright, Condoleezza Rice and Hillary Clinton to positions of diplomatic global power."

== Plot ==
Two arms negotiators stroll in the woods above Geneva, Switzerland, in the late summer, away from the glare of the negotiating table. They are a Soviet diplomat, Andrey Botvinnik, age 57, and John Honeyman, age 45, an American negotiator. The two men eventually develop a relationship, although their personalities differ. Botvinnik is friendly and enjoys American culture, Honeyman is formal and idealistic.

Note: the play is suggested by a real-life incident, which occurred in 1982. "Negotiators Paul H. Nitze and Yuli A. Kvitsinsky left the official Geneva sessions for an unofficial "walk in the woods" and achieved a breakthrough, soon rejected by their Governments."

== Critical response ==
Frank Rich, in his review of the Broadway production for The New York Times, wrote: "...as a piece of theater, 'A Walk in the Woods' is the esthetic equivalent of Switzerland, and not only because its setting is 'a pleasant woods on the outskirts of Geneva.' The play at the Booth fudges the distinctions of actual international politics and arms negotiations, choosing instead to telescope the messy, life-or-death conflict into a sentimental relationship between two likable envoys."

Alvin Klein, in reviewing the Westport Country Playhouse production for The New York Times, wrote: "Mr. Blessing's play is a [c]one of ideas, intelligence and some semblance of wit. The dramatic action and character exposition he has provided is negligible. It remains for the actors to establish complete characters and this Mr. Constantine and Mr. Pressman do with immense skill."

== Awards and nominations ==
The play was nominated for the 1988 Tony Award, Play and Actor in a Play (Prosky). Prosky won the 1988 Outer Critics Circle Award, Outstanding Actor in a Play.

The play was a finalist for the 1987 Pulitzer Prize for Drama.

Alec Guinness was nominated for the 1988 Olivier Award, Actor of the Year in a New Play, and the play was nominated as the BBC Award for the Play of the Year

== Film adaptation ==
The play was adapted into a 1989 television film, written by Blessing and directed by Kirk Browning.
