= Nacirema Club =

- U.S. National Register of Historic Places
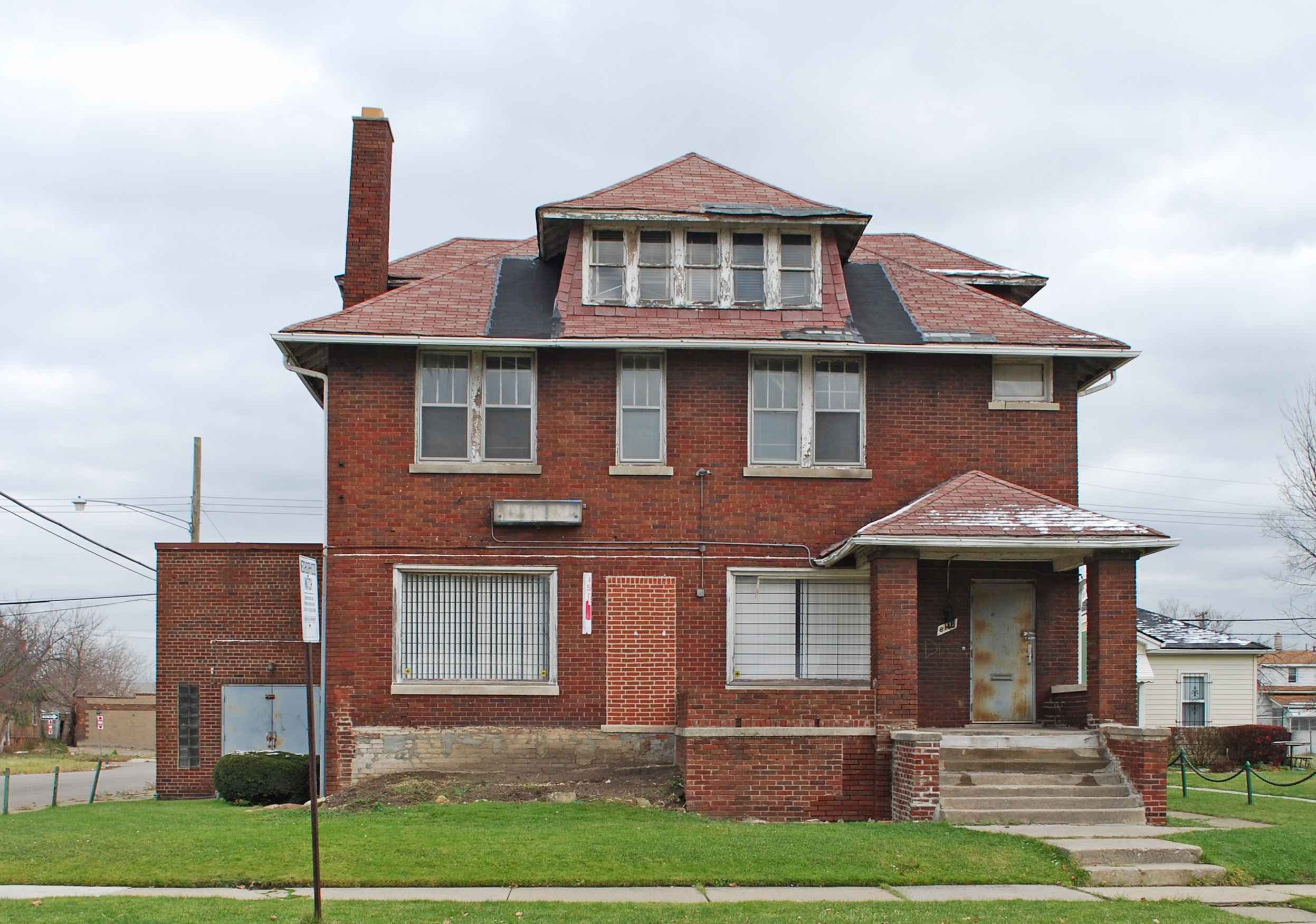
- Interactive map
- Location: 6118 30th Street; Detroit, Michigan
- Coordinates: 42°20′59″N 83°6′58″W
- Area: less than one acre
- Built: 1920
- Built by: Medard Libbrecht
- Architectural style: American Foursquare
- NRHP reference No.: 11000867
- Added to NRHP: November 30, 2011

The Nacirema Club is a social club located at 6118 30th Street in Detroit, Michigan; it was the first African American social club in Michigan. It was listed on the National Register of Historic Places in 2011.

== History ==
In the 1910s and 1920s, Detroit saw a substantial influx of African Americans moving from the southern states in hopes of finding employment. The growth of the African American community was so great that the Black Bottom district on the east side was no longer adequate. With the population pressure, Blacks began moving in substantial numbers to other parts of the city, including the area along Tireman Avenue. This neighborhood became a Black enclave through the middle of the century, with numerous single- and multi-family houses and vibrant commercial districts along Tireman and Grand River Avenue.

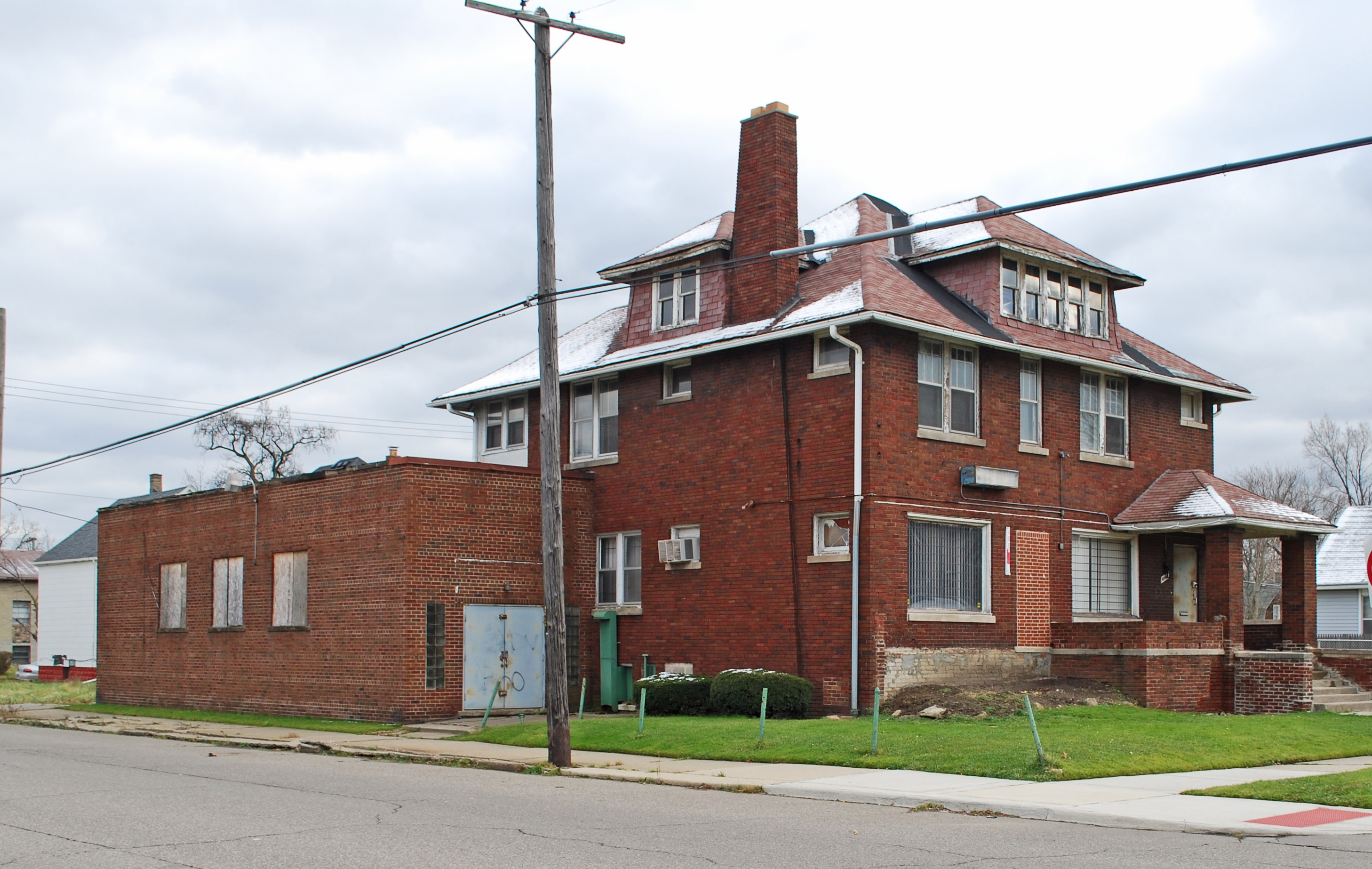
Side view of Nacirema Club, showing 1949 addition on left

As the neighborhood grew, so did its social network. In 1922, Raymond H. Menard and Julian Archer founded the Nacirema Club as a place for well-to-do Black men to relax and network. The club was patterned after established White clubs in the city such as the Detroit Athletic Club and the Detroit Club. The name of the club is "American" spelled backwards, and is meant as a reminder that African Americans, even in this time of racial prejudice, are proud to be Americans. The club was officially incorporated in 1932, with 21 charter members, including doctors, lawyers, teachers, postal workers, and factory workers. Edgar Houston served as the first president.

In 1923 the club purchased a two-story brick house which had been built three years earlier and converted it into their clubhouse. Further alterations were made in 1937 and 1942, and in 1949 a one-story addition was constructed to the rear. The club had a ballroom, dining room, and a spacious lobby, and was used by the community for wedding receptions, proms, anniversary parties, and other social events. During its heyday, the highlight of the season was the club's "Nacirema Week", where the club hosted a racetrack party, boat ride, picnic, and dinner dance. The club continued to be a men-only club until 1998, when women were first admitted as members.

Although the surrounding neighborhood has fallen on hard times and club membership has dwindled, the Nacirema Club still exists.

== Description ==
The building housing the Nacirema Club is a two-story, four-square vernacular American Foursquare style house covered with reddish-brown brick. It has a shallow overhanging hipped roof with projecting dormers on each side. On the front façade, a similar hipped roof covers the front porch and entryway. First-floor windows in the front have been altered, with one window bricked in and a double window replaced with a picture window. Second-floor windows are double-hung windows with paned uppers.

The building is the most substantial structure on the block, and the only one with brick facing. Surrounding structures are smaller frame single-family homes, and what are now empty lots.

The 1949 addition extends to the rear alley and completely covers what was once the back yard. The addition is concrete and brick.
