= Eleemosynary (play) =

One-act play by Lee Blessing

- Written by: Lee Blessing
- Characters: Dorothea, Artemis, Echo

Premiere
- Date premiered: August 1985
- Place premiered: Park Square Theatre; St. Paul, Minnesota

Eleemosynary is a 1985 multi act play by Lee Blessing. It follows the relationships between three generations of women. The word "eleemosynary" itself plays a significant part in the plot.

== Characters ==
The characters in the play are:

- Dorothea: An old woman who has chosen to be eccentric.
- Artemis (Artie): Dorothea's daughter. Holds an important job as a biochemist. Has an incredible memory.
- Echo: Artie's daughter. Lives with Dorothea. Is an excellent speller, in addition to having extraordinary intellectual abilities.

== Plot ==
The play examines the very delicate relationship of three women: a grandmother, Dorothea, who has sought to exert her independence through strong willed eccentric behavior, Artie, her daughter, who has run from her overpowering mother, and Echo, Artie's daughter, who is incredibly smart and equally sensitive. After Dorothea (who has raised Echo into her teens) suffers a stroke, Echo is forced to reestablish contact with her mother through extended phone conversations, during which real issues are skirted and the talk is mostly about the precocious Echo's unparalleled success in a national spelling bee. In the end, Artie and Echo come to accept their mutual need and summon the courage to build a life together, despite the terror this holds after so many difficult years of estrangement.

== Productions ==
In addition to its premiere production in Minnesota, Eleemosynary was produced from April 25, 1989, to May 28, 1989, by the Manhattan Theatre Club at the New York City Center, Stage II. Directed by Lynn Meadow, the cast consisted of Joanna Gleason (Artie), Eileen Heckart (Dorothea) and Jennie Moreau (Echo). Moreau won a 1989 Theatre World Award for her acting in the production. The play, represented by Dramatists Play Service, has been produced at a number of theaters since its premiere.
