= Fortinbras (play) =

1991 play by Lee Blessing

Fortinbras is a 1991 play by American playwright Lee Blessing. Set immediately following William Shakespeare's Hamlet, the play recounts the events after Hamlet's death that go on throughout Elsinore. The play includes almost every character from Hamlet returning as a ghost.

== Production ==
Fortinbras opened on 18 June 1991 at the La Jolla Playhouse.

== Crew ==
| Name | Role |
|---|---|
| Des McAnuff | Artistic Director |
| Alan Levey | Managing Director |
| Robert Brill | Scene design |
| Susan Hilferty | Costume design |
| Chris Parry | Lighting design |
| Michael Roth | Music and sound design |
| Kenneth Ted Bible | Sound design |
| Andy Tighe | Stage manager |

== Cast ==
| Name | Role |
|---|---|
| Don Reilly | Hamlet |
| Jefferson Mays | Osric |
| Ralph Bruneau | Horatio |
| William Gain | English ambassador |
| Daniel Jenkins | Fortinbras |
| Paul Gutrecht | Captain of the Norwegian army |
| James Crawford | Marcellus |
| James Kiernan | Barnardo |
| Archer Martin | Polish maiden |
| Kim C. Walsh | Polish maiden |
| William Cain | Polonius |
| Laura Linney | Ophelia |
| Jonathan Freeman | Claudius |
| Devon Allen | Gertrude |
| Josh Sebers | Laertes |

== Sources ==
- Blessing, Lee (1992). Fortinbras. Dramatists Play Service. ISBN 9780822204213.
- Drake, Sylvie (25 June 1991). "La Jolla Fortinbras Played for Laughs". Los Angeles Times.
