= Alien 3 (soundtrack) =

Alien 3: Original Motion Picture Soundtrack

Soundtrack album by Elliot Goldenthal
- Released: June 9, 1992
- Recorded: April–May 1992
- Genres: Classical, avant-garde, modernist, musique concrète, electronic
- Length: 47:58
- Labels: MCA; MCA MCAD-10629
- Producer: Matthias Gohl

Elliot Goldenthal chronology
Pet Sematary (1989)	Alien 3: Original Motion Picture Soundtrack (1992)	Demolition Man (1993)

The avant-garde Alien 3: Original Motion Picture Soundtrack was written for the motion picture of the same name. Scored by Elliot Goldenthal, it was his first big mainstream score; he described it as an experiment and spent a whole year creating it.

== The score ==
Goldenthal cites the score as one of his six stand-out soundtracks. While creating the score in Los Angeles, the Los Angeles riots of 1992 were going on and he has noted that the wild and tempestuous atmosphere in the city was an influence on the score's dark and visceral sound.

In 1995, the industrial band Front Line Assembly sampled the cue "Agnus Dei" on the track "Infra Red Combat" from the album Hard Wired.

In 2007 the UK dubstep artist Burial sampled the soundtrack in the first track of his album Untrue.

== Reception ==
Professional ratings
Review scores
Source	Rating
AllMusic	4.5/5 stars
Filmtracks	2/5 stars
Movie-wave.net	4/5 stars

Movie-wave.net said that most of the cues are quite "dissonant" and "bleak" for a casual movie score listener. AllMusic described it as "...mandatory for all serious enthusiasts of film music."

== Track listing ==
1. "Agnus Dei" – 4:29
  - Boy soprano: Nick Nackley
2. "Bait and Chase" – 4:42
3. "The Beast Within" – 3:09
4. "Lento" – 5:48
5. "Candles in the Wind" – 3:20
6. "Wreckage and Rape" – 2:43
7. "The First Attack" – 4:19
8. "Lullaby Elegy" – 3:41
9. "Death Dance" – 2:18
10. "Visit to the Wreckage" – 2:04
11. "Explosion and Aftermath" – 2:21
12. "The Dragon" – 3:08
13. "The Entrapment" – 3:42
14. "Adagio" – 4:14

== 2018 Special Edition Track Listing ==
CD 1 The FILM SCORE

1. "20th Century Fox Trademark (Alien Version) / Main Title" - 4:53
2. "Status Reports" - 2:59
3. "The Survivor Is a Woman" - 1:59
4. "The Wreckage" - 2:08
5. "Lullaby Elegy (Extended Version) " - 5:28
6. "The Cremation" - 4:04
7. "Chow Down With the Boys" - 2:28
8. "How Do You Like Your New Haircut? " - 1:46
9. "The First Attack (Film Version) " - 1:18
10. "Appreciative of Your Affections" - 1:45
11. "That's His Boot" - 2:29
12. "A Mark, A Burn" - 0:57
13. "Wreckage and Rape" - 2:43
14. "Candles in the Wind" - 3:24
15. "Bishop Turned On" - 2:29
16. "You're Going to Die Too" - 2:01
17. "It's a Long Sad Story / Clemens Dies" - 4:21
18. "Andrews' Sting / What Are We Going to Do? " - 4:53
19. "Explosion and Aftermath (Extended Version) " - 3:13
20. "I Have to Get to the Ship" - 4:17
21. "In the Basement" - 1:33
22. "Alien's Lair" - 3:33
23. "The Beast Within" - 3:12
24. "Visit to the Wreckage" - 2:05
25. "Bait and Chase (Extended Version) " - 4:56

CD 2 THE FILM SCORE (Continued)

1. "It's Started" - 3:36
2. "More Bait and Chase" - 2:21
3. "Trap the Alien / Dillon's Deliverance" - 2:04
4. "Gotcha / Hello, I Must Be Going" - 2:29
5. "Adagio" - 4:18

ALTERNATES

1. "The Cremation (Alternate) " - 4:34
2. "You Can Still Have a Life (Alternate) " - 4:04
3. "20th Century Fox Trademarks / Alien Version" - 1:15

The Original 1992 MCA Album (remastered)

1. "Agnus Dei" - 4:29
2. "Bait and Chase" - 4:42
3. "The Beast Within" - 3:10
4. "Lento" - 5:49
5. "Candles in the Wind" - 3:21
6. "Wreckage and Rape" - 2:44
7. "The First Attack" - 4:20
8. "Lullaby Elegy" - 3:41
9. "Death Dance" - 2:17
10. "Visit to the Wreckage" - 2:04
11. "Explosion and Aftermath" - 2:21
12. "The Dragon" - 3:07
13. "The Entrapment" - 3:42
14. "Adagio" - 4:16

== Crew/Credit ==
- Music composed and orchestrated by Elliot Goldenthal
- Music produced by Matthias Gohl
- Orchestra conducted by Jonathan Sheffer
- Performed by the Hollywood Studio Symphony
- Additional orchestrations by Dennis Dreith and Robert Elhai
- Synthesizer programming by Richard Martinez
- Music mixed by Joel Iwataki at The Enterprise Studios
- Electronic music recorded at The Enterprise Studios, The Village Recorders, Los Angeles, and Eastside Sound, New York
- Orchestral music recorded by Tim Boyle at Twentieth Century Fox
- Boy soprano soloist on "Agnus Dei": Nick Nackley
