= Lee Blessing =

American playwright

Lee Knowlton Blessing
- Born: October 4, 1949 (age 76); Minneapolis, Minnesota, U.S.
- Education: Reed College (BA); University of Iowa (MFA)
- Spouse(s): Jeanne Blake (1986-1999); Melanie Marnich (2006-present)
- Writing career
- Notable work: A Walk in the Woods
- Notable awards: American College Theater Festival Award; American Theater Critics Association Award; CableACE Awards (nomination); Dramalogue Award; Great American Play Award; Guggenheim Fellowship; Humanitas Prize Award; National Endowment for the Arts Grant; Pulitzer Prize (nomination); Tony Award (nomination)

Lee Knowlton Blessing (born October 4, 1949) is an American playwright best known for his 1988 work A Walk in the Woods. Blessing has worked in regional theaters in and around Minneapolis as well as in New York City.

== Life and career ==
Blessing was born in Minneapolis on 4 October 1949 and graduated from Minnetonka High School in 1967. He began college at the University of Minnesota, but later transferred to Reed College in Oregon where he earned a bachelor of arts in English in 1971.

After Blessing graduated from Reed, his parents offered him the choice between a used car or a trip to Russia; Blessing chose Russia. In Russia, he wrote best-known work A Walk in the Woods. According to interviews with Blessing, the play, which depicts the developing relationship between a Russian and an American arms limitation negotiator is based on fact. During the 1982 talks in Geneva, Switzerland, Soviet Yuli Kvitsinsky and American Paul Nitze left the formal discussions to literally take a walk in the woods. Following its premiere in Waterford, Connecticut, A Walk in the Woods premiered on Broadway. The play was nominated for both a Tony Award and a Pulitzer Prize. Though the production won neither award, it was reprised produced in Moscow in 1989 and later adapted for television.

Upon returning from his tenure abroad, Blessing went on to study playwriting at the University of Iowa where he received master of fine arts degree in English as well as Speech and Theater. He would later return to teach at the Iowa's Playwrights Workshop and the Iowa Writers' Workshop in addition to his time as an instructor at the Playwright's Center in Minneapolis. He currently serves as head of the graduate playwriting program at Mason Gross School of the Arts at Rutgers University.

Blessing's plays include A Body of Water, Whores, The Scottish Play, Black Sheep, Fortinbras, and many others. He has also written one act plays including The Roads That Lead Here and Eleemosynary. Eight of his plays have been staged at the Eugene O'Neill Theater Center in Waterford, Connecticut during the prestigious National Playwrights Conference. Several of his most recent works produced in New York City including Thief River, Cobb and Chesapeake, received Drama Desk nominations and an award, plus nominations from the Outer Critics Circle.

Blessing married his first wife, Jeanne Blake, in 1986. He is currently married to fellow playwright and screenwriter, Melanie Marnich.

== Works ==
=== Theatre ===
- 1975: The Real Billy The Kid
- 1980: The Authentic Life of Billy the Kid (revised version premiered Washington, D.C., 1979)
- 1983: Nice People Dancing to Good Country Music (premiered Louisville, Kentucky, 1982)
- 1985: Independence (premiered Louisville, Kentucky, 1984)
- 1986: Riches (as War of the Roses, premiered Louisville, Kentucky, 1985)
- 1987: Eleemosynary (premiered St. Paul, Minnesota, 1985; New York, 1989)
- 1988: Oldtimers Game (premiered Louisville, Kentucky, 1982)
- 1988: A Walk in the Woods (premiered La Jolla, California, 1987; New York and London, 1988)
- 1990: Two Rooms (premiered La Jolla, California, 1988)
- 1991: Cobb (premiered New Haven, Connecticut, 1989)
- 1991: Down the Road (premiered La Jolla, California, 1989)
- 1992: Fortinbras (sequel to William Shakespeare's Hamlet)
- 1993: Lake Street Extension (premiered New York, 1992)
- 1995: Patient A
- 1997: Going to St. Ives (premiered in Seattle, WA, 1997)
- 1999: Chesapeake (premiered in New York, NY, 1999)
- 2000: The Winning Streak (premiered in Waterford, CT, 1999)
- 2000: Thief River (premiered in Waterford, CT, 2000)
- 2001: Black Sheep (premiered in Manalapan, Florida, 2001)
- 2002: The Roads That Lead Here
- 2002: Whores (premiered in Waterford, CT, 2002)
- 2003: Snapshot (premiered in Louisville, KY, 2002)
- 2003: Tyler Poked Taylor (premiered in Louisville, KY, 2002)
- 2003: The Road that Leads Here (premiered in Minneapolis, MN, 2002)
- 2004: Flag Day (premiered in Shepherdstown, WV, 2004)
- 2005: The Scottish Play
- 2005: A Body of Water
- 2006: Lonesome Hollow
- 2007: Moderation
- 2008: Great Falls
- 2008: Perilous Night
- 2009: Into You
- 2009: Heaven's My Destination
- 2010: When We Go Upon the Sea (premiered in Philadelphia, PA, 2010)
- 2013 Courting Harry, (premiered in St. Paul, MN, 2013)
- 2015 For the Loyal (premiered in Minneapolis, MN, 2015)
- 2023 “Las Cruces” (premiered in Brooklyn, NY, 2024)

=== Television ===
- 1993: Cooperstown

== Awards ==
- American College Theater Festival Award (1979)
- Jerome Foundation Grant (1981, 1982)
- McKnight Foundation Grant (1983, 1989)
- Great American Play Award
  - Oldtimers Game (1982)
  - Independence (1984)
  - War of the Roses (1985)
  - Down the Road (1991)
  - Snapshot (2002)
  - The Roads that Lead Here (2003)
  - Great Falls (2008)
- National Endowment for the Arts Grant (1985, 1988)
- Bush Foundation Fellowship (1987)
- American Theater Critics Association Award
  - A Walk in the Woods (1987)
  - A Body of Water (2006)
  - Great Falls (Citation, 2009)
- Marton Award (1988)
- Dramalogue Award (1988)
- Guggenheim Fellowship (1989)
- Humanitas Prize (1993)
