= Hamlet on screen =

Over fifty films of William Shakespeare's Hamlet have been made since 1900. Seven post-war Hamlet films have had a theatrical release (in addition to Richard Burton's Hamlet, a film of the John Gielgud-directed 1964 Broadway production): Laurence Olivier's Hamlet of 1948; Grigori Kozintsev's 1964 Russian adaptation; Tony Richardson's 1969 version (the first in colour) featuring Nicol Williamson as Hamlet and Anthony Hopkins as Claudius; Franco Zeffirelli's 1990 version starring Mel Gibson; Kenneth Branagh's full-text 1996 version; Michael Almereyda's 2000 modernisation, starring Ethan Hawke; and Aneil Karia's 2025 modernisation, starring Riz Ahmed.

Because of the play's length, most films of Hamlet are heavily cut, although Branagh's 1996 version used the full text.

== Approaches ==
The full conflated text of Hamlet can run to four hours in performance, so most film adaptations are heavily cut, sometimes by removing entire characters. Fortinbras can be excised with minimal textual difficulty, and so a major decision for the director of Hamlet, on stage or on screen, is whether or not to include him. Excluding Fortinbras removes much of the play's political dimension, resulting in a more personal performance than those in which he is retained. Fortinbras makes no appearance in Olivier's and Zeffirelli's versions, while in Kozintsev's and Branagh's films he is a major presence.

Another significant decision for a director is whether to play up or play down the incestuous feelings that Freudian critics believe Hamlet harbours for his mother. Olivier and Zeffirelli highlight this interpretation of the plot (especially through casting decisions) while Kozintsev and Branagh avoid this interpretation.

Harry Keyishan has suggested that directors of Hamlet on screen invariably place it within one of the established film genres: Olivier's Hamlet, he claims, is a film noir; Zeffirelli's version is an action adventure and Branagh's is an epic. Keyishan adds that Hamlet films can also be classified by the auteur theory: Olivier's and Zeffirelli's Hamlets, for example, can be viewed among the body of their directorial work.

== Significant theatrical releases ==
=== Laurence Olivier, 1948 ===
This black and white British film of Hamlet was directed by and starred Laurence Olivier. As in Olivier's previous Shakespeare adaptation, Henry V (1944), the film's score was composed by William Walton. It has received the most prestigious accolades of any Shakespeare film, winning the Academy Awards for Best Picture and Best Actor.

The film opens with Olivier's voiceover of his own interpretation of the play, which has been criticised as reductive: "This is the tragedy of a man who could not make up his mind." Olivier excised the "political" elements of the play (entirely cutting Fortinbras, Rosencrantz and Guildenstern) in favour of an intensely psychological performance. He played up the Oedipal overtones of the play, to the extent of casting the 28-year-old Eileen Herlie as Hamlet's mother, opposite himself (aged 40) as Hamlet. Film scholar Jack Jorgens has commented that "Hamlet's scenes with the Queen in her low-cut gowns are virtually love scenes." In contrast, Jean Simmons' Ophelia is destroyed by Hamlet's treatment of her in the nunnery scene: ending with her collapsing on the staircase in what Deborah Cartmell calls the position of a rape victim. According to J. Lawrence Guntner, the style of the film owes much to German Expressionism and to film noir: the cavernous sets featuring narrow winding stairwells correspond to the labyrinths of Hamlet's psyche.

=== Grigori Kozintsev, 1964 ===
Hamlet (Russian: Гамлет, romanized: Gamlet) is a 1964 film adaptation in Russian, based on a translation by Boris Pasternak and directed by Grigori Kozintsev, with a score by Dmitri Shostakovich. The film is heavily informed by the post-Stalinist era in which it was made, Pasternak and lead actor Innokenty Smoktunovsky having suffered under Stalin. In contrast to Olivier's film, Kozintsev's is political and public. Where Olivier had narrow winding stairwells, Kozintsev had broad avenues, populated with ambassadors and courtiers. The camera frequently looks through bars and grates, and J. Lawrence Guntner has suggested that the image of Ophelia in an iron farthingale symbolises the fate of the sensitive and intelligent in the film's tough political environment.

Kozintsev consistently cast actors whose first language was not Russian, so as to bring shades of other traditions into his film. Smoktunovsky's individual manner of acting distinguished the film from other versions, and his explosive behaviour in the recorder scene is viewed by many critics, as the film's climax. Douglas Brode has criticised the film for presenting a Hamlet who barely pauses for reflection: with most of the soliloquies cut, it is circumstances, not an inner conflict, that delay his revenge.

=== Tony Richardson, 1969 ===
The first Hamlet filmed in colour, this film stars Nicol Williamson as Prince Hamlet. It was directed by Tony Richardson and based on his own stage production at the Roundhouse theatre in London. The film, a departure from big-budget Hollywood renditions of classics, was made with a small budget and a very minimalist set, consisting of Renaissance fixtures and costumes in a dark, shadowed space. A brick tunnel is used for the scenes on the battlements. The Ghost of Hamlet's father is represented only by a light shining on the observers. The version proved to be a critical and commercial failure: partly due to the decision to market the film as a tragic love story to teenage audiences who were still flocking to Franco Zeffirelli's 1968 Romeo and Juliet, and yet to cast opposite Marianne Faithfull's Ophelia the "balding, paunchy Williamson, who looked more like her father than her lover."

=== Franco Zeffirelli, 1990 ===
Franco Zeffirelli's 1990 film of Hamlet stars Mel Gibson as the title character, with Glenn Close as Gertrude, Alan Bates as Claudius and Helena Bonham Carter as Ophelia.

Film scholar Deborah Cartmell has suggested that Zeffirelli's Shakespeare films are appealing because they are "sensual rather than cerebral", an approach by which he aims to make Shakespeare "even more popular". (Note: Deborah Cartmell quotes a Zeffirelli interview given to The South Bank Show in December 1997.) To this end, he cast the Hollywood actor Mel Gibson – then famous for the Mad Max and Lethal Weapon films – in the title role. Cartmell also notes that the text is drastically cut, with the effect of enhancing the roles of the women.

J. Lawrence Guntner has suggested that Zeffirelli's cinematography borrows heavily from the action film genre that made Gibson famous, noting that its average shot length is less than six seconds. In casting Gibson, the director has been said to have made the star's reputation part of the performance, encouraging the audience "to see the Gibson that they have come to expect from his other films". Indeed, Gibson was cast after Zeffirelli watched his character contemplate suicide in the first Lethal Weapon film. Harry Keyishan has suggested that Hamlet is well suited to this treatment, as it provides occasions for "enjoyable violence". J. Lawrence Guntner has written that the casting of Glenn Close as Mel Gibson's mother (only eleven years older than he was, in life, and then famous as the psychotic "other woman" in Fatal Attraction) highlights the incest theme, leaving "little to our post-Freudian imagination". and Deborah Cartmell notes that Close and Gibson simulate sex in the closet scene, and "she dies after sexually suggestive jerking movements, with Hamlet positioned on top of her, his face covered with sweat".

=== Kenneth Branagh, 1996 ===
In contrast to Zeffirelli's heavily cut Hamlet of a few years before, Kenneth Branagh adapted, directed, and starred in a version containing every word of Shakespeare's play, running for around four hours. He based aspects of the staging on Adrian Noble's recent Royal Shakespeare Company production of the play, in which he had played the title role.

In a radical departure from previous Hamlet films, Branagh set the internal scenes in a vibrantly colourful setting, featuring a throne room dominated by mirrored doors; film scholar Samuel Crowl calls the setting "film noir with all the lights on." Branagh chose Victorian era costuming and furnishings, using Blenheim Palace, built in the early 18th century, as Elsinore Castle for the external scenes. Harry Keyishan has suggested that the film is structured as an epic, courting comparison with Ben Hur, The Ten Commandments and Doctor Zhivago. As J. Lawrence Guntner points out, comparisons with the latter film are heightened by the presence of Julie Christie (Zhivago's Lara) as Gertrude.

The film makes frequent use of flashbacks to dramatise elements that are not performed in Shakespeare's text, such as Hamlet's sexual relationship with Kate Winslet's Ophelia. These flashbacks include performances by several famous actors in non-speaking roles: Yorick is played by Ken Dodd, Old Norway by John Mills and John Gielgud as Priam and Judi Dench as Hecuba in a dramatisation of the Player King's speech about the fall of Troy.

=== Michael Almereyda, 2000 ===
Directed by Michael Almereyda and set in contemporary Manhattan, this film stars Ethan Hawke, who plays Hamlet as a film student. It also features Julia Stiles as Ophelia, Liev Schreiber as Laertes, and Bill Murray as Polonius. In this version, Claudius becomes CEO of the "Denmark Corporation", having taken over the firm by killing his brother. The film is notable for its inclusion of modern technology: for example, the ghost of Hamlet's murdered father first appears on closed-circuit TV. The script is heavily cut, to suit the modern day surroundings. Ethan Hawke is the youngest of the big-screen Hamlets, at 27 when production began.

== Other screen performances ==
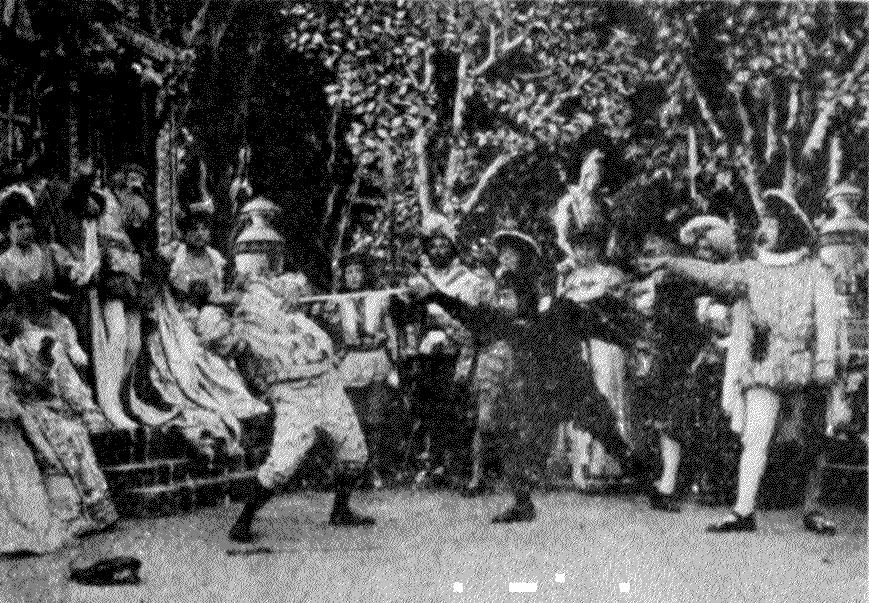
Georges Méliès as Hamlet, in the duel from Hamlet (1907)

In the late nineteenth and early twentieth centuries, the central character, Prince Hamlet, was perceived as effeminate; so it is fitting that the earliest screen success as Hamlet was Sarah Bernhardt in a one-minute film of the fencing scene, in 1900 for the Phono-Cinema Theater exhibit at the Paris 1900 Exhibition. The film had the novel feature of having the sound effects of swords clashing, which was synchronized from a Pathé cylinder to be played along with the film. Silent versions of the play were directed by Georges Méliès in 1907 (Hamlet), Luca Comerio in 1908, William George Barker in 1910, August Blom in 1910, Cecil Hepworth in 1913 and Eleuterio Rodolfi in 1917.

In 1920, Svend Gade directed Asta Nielsen in a version derived from Edward Vining's 1881 book "The Mystery of Hamlet", in which Hamlet is a woman who spends her life disguised as a man.

In Maximilian Schell's performance in Hamlet, Hamlet is an idealist activist standing up to Claudius' corrupt establishment. Karl Michael Vogler played Horatio. This version was successfully televised, but technical and dubbing issues caused it to be less successful on the English language big-screen. The English version is best remembered for being mocked on one of the final episodes of Mystery Science Theater 3000.

John Gielgud directed Richard Burton in a successful run of the play at the Lunt-Fontanne Theatre in 1964-5. A film of the production, Richard Burton's Hamlet played limited engagements in 1964. It was made using ELECTRONOVISION, which proved to be an ineffective hybrid of stage and screen methods, although its novelty value made the film a commercial success at the time.

Philip Saville directed Christopher Plummer in a TV version usually called Hamlet at Elsinore, filmed in black-and-white at Kronborg Slot, the castle at Elsinore where the play is set. It featured Michael Caine as Horatio (his only Shakespearean role) and Robert Shaw as Claudius.

Richard Chamberlain was a rarity: an American actor in the central role of a UK Shakespeare production. His critically acclaimed television Hamlet was, in his words, "pressed into service as part of the student protest, with Hamlet as victim of the generation gap." While in England he took vocal coaching and in 1969 performed the title role in Hamlet for the Birmingham Repertory Theatre, becoming the first American to play the role there since John Barrymore in 1929. He received excellent notices and reprised the role for television, for ITV, in 1970, with Margaret Leighton as Gertrude and Michael Redgrave as Polonius; a shortened version was telecast in the United States as part of Hallmark Hall of Fame.

The BBC Television Shakespeare was a project to televise the entire canon of plays. Their version of Hamlet starred Derek Jacobi as the prince and Patrick Stewart as Claudius.

S4C's Shakespeare: The Animated Tales series included a half-hour abridgement of Hamlet, featuring the voice of Nicholas Farrell as the Dane. The animator, Natalia Orlova, used an oil-on-glass technique: a scene would be painted and a number of frames would be shot, back-lit; then some paint would be scraped off and the scene partially repainted for the next frame. The effect has been described as "oddly both fluid and static ... capable of [representing] intense emotion."

Kevin Kline directed and starred in a production of Hamlet for the New York Shakespeare Festival which was televised in 1990 as part of the Great Performances anthology series on PBS.

Adapted from the successful Royal Shakespeare Company production, Hamlet, directed by Greg Doran and starring David Tennant as Prince Hamlet, was produced for BBC Two and the RSC by Illuminations Television. In addition to Tennant, the cast also featured Patrick Stewart as Claudius, as well as most of the cast of the original stage production. It aired on 26 December 2009 and was released on BBC DVD on 4 January 2010. This was the first Shakespeare work to be filmed on the pioneering RED camera system.

In 2024, the work was adapted to screen with Ian McKellen in the title role, directed by Sean Mathias. It was filmed using the building of the Theatre Royal, Windsor.

== Adaptations ==
Edgar G. Ulmer's Strange Illusion was the first post-war film to adapt the Hamlet story, and was one of the earliest films to focus its attentions on a young character's psychology.

Hamlet has been adapted into stories which deal with civil corruption by the West German director Helmut Käutner in Der Rest ist Schweigen (The Rest is Silence) and by the Japanese director Akira Kurosawa in Warui Yatsu Hodo Yoku Nemuru (The Bad Sleep Well). In Claude Chabrol's Ophélia (France, 1962) the central character, Yvan, watches Olivier's Hamlet and convinces himself - wrongly, and with tragic results - that he is in Hamlet's situation. A Spaghetti Western version has been made: Johnny Hamlet directed by Enzo Castellari in 1968. Strange Brew (1983) is a movie featuring the comic fictional Canadians Bob and Doug MacKenzie (played by Rick Moranis and Dave Thomas). As stand-ins for the characters of Rosencrantz and Guildenstern, they investigate the manufacture of poisonous beer at the Elsinore Brewery where the prior owner has mysteriously died, and is now run by his brother Claude. Aki Kaurismäki's Hamlet Liikemaailmassa (Hamlet Goes Business) (Finland, 1987) piles on the irony: a sawmill owner is poisoned, and his brother plans to sell the mills to invest in rubber ducks.

Tom Stoppard directed a 1990 film version of his own play Rosencrantz & Guildenstern Are Dead, with Gary Oldman and Tim Roth in the title roles, which incorporates scenes from Hamlet starring Iain Glen as the Dane; Douglas Brode regards it as less successful on screen than it had been on stage, due to the preponderance of talk over action.

Luca Damiano's 1996 Hamlet: For the Love of Ophelia parts 1 and 2 were pornographic adaptations of the play.

Tardid تردید (The Doubt) is a 2009 Iranian film directed and written by Varuzh Karim Masihi. It is an adaptation of Hamlet, and is set in Modern Tehran .The film stars Bahram Radan, Taraneh Alidoosti and Hamed Komeili.

Haider is a 2014 Bollywood film directed by Vishal Bhardwaj, and written by Basharat Peer and Bhardwaj. It is an adaptation of Hamlet, and is set in Kashmir. The film stars Tabu, Shahid Kapoor as the eponymous protagonist, Shraddha Kapoor, and Kay Kay Menon.

The 2018 film Ophelia, directed by Claire McCarthy, follows the story of Hamlet from Ophelia's perspective. Based on the novel by Lisa Klein, it stars Daisy Ridley as Ophelia, George MacKay as Hamlet, Naomi Watts as Gertrude, and Clive Owen as Claudius.

Grand Theft Hamlet, directed by Sam Crane and Pinny Grylls, was filmed during the COVID-19 pandemic in 2020. It follows the two directors as they stage a production of Hamlet within the video game Grand Theft Auto Online, with characters represented by virtual avatars.

== Theatrical performances within films ==
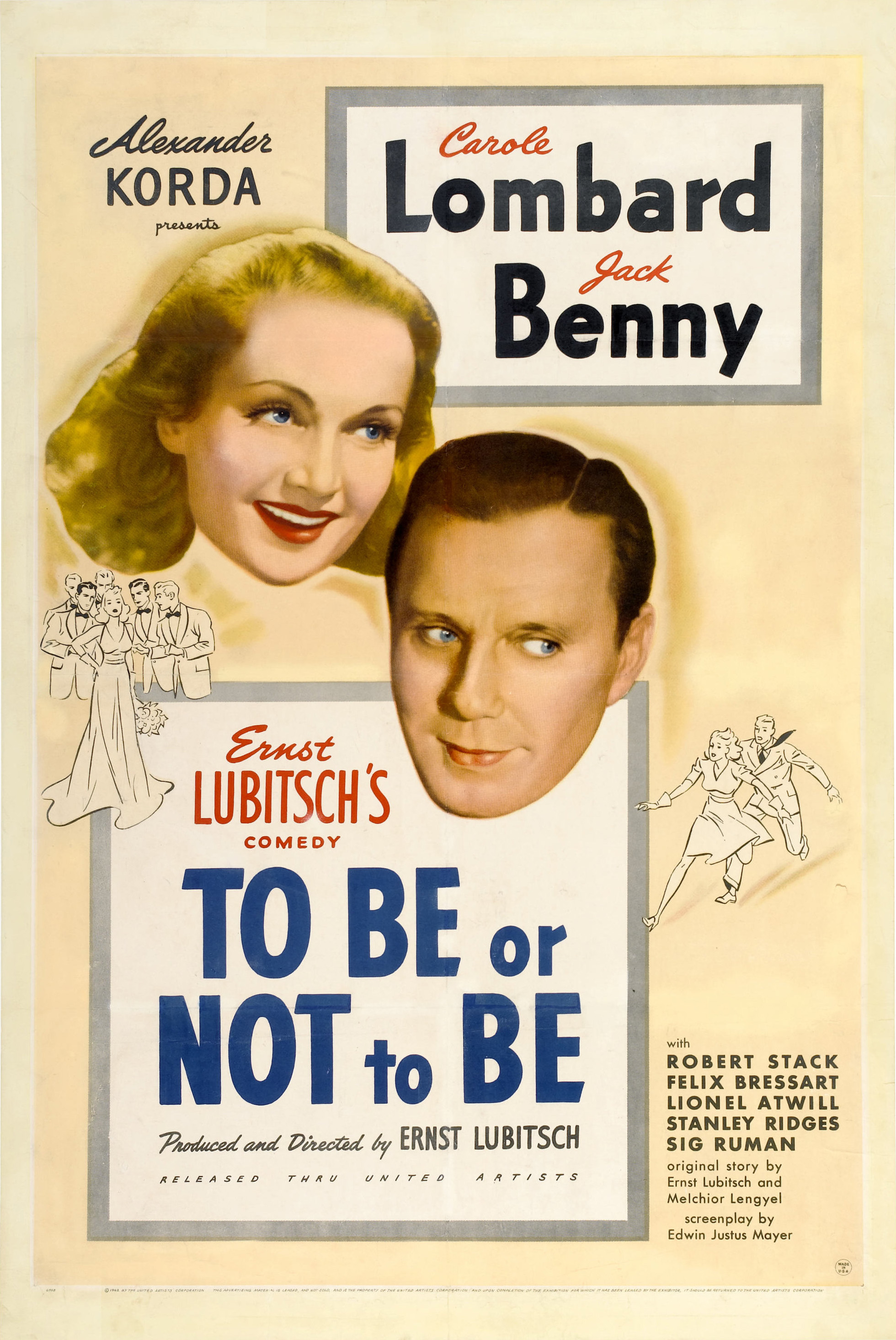
To Be or Not to Be (1942), directed by Ernst Lubitsch

Another way in which film-makers use Shakespearean texts is to feature characters who are actors performing those texts, within a wider non-Shakespearean story. Hamlet and Romeo and Juliet are the two plays which have most often been used in this way. (Note: McKernan and Terris list 45 instances of uses of Hamlet, not including films of the play itself. They list 39 such instances for Romeo and Juliet. The next closest is Othello, with 23 instances.) Usually, Shakespeare's story has some parallel or resonance with the main plot. In the 1933 Katharine Hepburn film Morning Glory, for which she won her first Best Actress Academy Award, Hepburn's character Eva Lovelace becomes slightly drunk at a party and very effectively begins to recite To be or not to be, when she is rudely interrupted. In James Whale's 1937 fictional biopic The Great Garrick, Brian Aherne, as David Garrick, performs part of the final scene of Hamlet, in full eighteenth-century garb. In Ernst Lubitsch's 1942 To Be or Not to Be, the title soliloquy becomes a subtle running gag: whenever Jack Benny's character—the pompous actor Joseph Tura—begins the speech, a member of the audience loudly walks out: usually to make love to Tura's wife, played by Carole Lombard. (Note: This also happened to Mel Brooks' character Frederick Bronski in the 1983 remake.) In the 1955 film Prince of Players, a biography of Edwin Booth, Richard Burton appears in the title role and performs several scenes from Hamlet. The 1969 Robert Bresson film A Gentle Woman has the wife and husband attending a performance; in which we see the character Elle engrossed in the final scene of the play. Shelley Long's character plays Hamlet in the 1987 film Outrageous Fortune. Kenneth Branagh wrote and directed the low-budget In The Bleak Midwinter (released in the USA as A Midwinter's Tale) immediately before shooting his famous Hamlet. Shot in just 21 days, and telling the story of a group of actors performing Hamlet on a shoestring to save a village church, the film is a tribute to Ealing Comedies, and to the foibles of the acting profession, shot in black and white. The PBS documentary Discovering Hamlet is about the stage production that Branagh appeared in years before making the film, and includes scenes from that production. The film Hamlet 2 centers around a high school drama class and their teacher, played by Steve Coogan, attempting to stage a very experimental and controversial musical sequel to Hamlet.

The BFI National Archive contains at least twenty films featuring characters performing (sometimes brief) excerpts from Hamlet, including When Hungry Hamlet Fled (USA, 1915), Das Alte Gesetz (Germany, 1923), The Immortal Gentleman (GB, 1935), The Arizonian (USA, 1935), South Riding (GB, 1937), My Darling Clementine (USA, 1946), Hancock's 43 Minutes (GB, 1957), Danger Within (GB, 1958), The Pure Hell of St Trinian's (GB, 1960), Shakespeare Wallah (India, 1965), The Magic Christian (GB, 1969), Everything You Always Wanted to Know About Sex, But Were Afraid to Ask (USA, 1972), Theatre of Blood (GB, 1973), Mephisto (Hungary, 1981), An Englishman Abroad (GB, 1983), Withnail and I (GB, 1986), Comic Relief 2 (GB, 1989), Great Expectations (GB/USA, 1989), Hysteria 2 (GB, 1989), The Voice Over Queen (USA, 1990) and Tectonic Plates (GB, 1992).

== List of screen performances ==
=== Silent Era ===
Title	Format Country Year	Director	Hamlet	Other roles
Hamlet	Silent; France; 1907	Georges Méliès	Georges Méliès	
Hamlet	Silent; Italy; 1908	Luca Comerio		
Hamlet (Silent, UK, 1910)	Silent; UK; 1910	William George Barker		
Hamlet	Silent; Denmark; 1910	August Blom	Alwin Neuß	Aage Hertel as Claudius; Ella La Cour as Gertrude; Emilie Sannom as Ophelia; Einar Zangenberg as Laertes; Oscar Langkilde as Horatio
Amleto	Silent; Italy; 1910	Mario Caserini	Dante Cappelli	
Hamlet	Silent; UK; 1913	E. Hay Plumb	Johnston Forbes-Robertson	
Hamlet	Silent; Italy; 1917	Eleuterio Rodolfi	Ruggero Ruggeri	
Hamlet (aka Hamlet, The Drama of Vengeance)	Silent; Germany; 1921	Svend Gade & Heinz Schall	Asta Nielsen	

=== Sound films ===
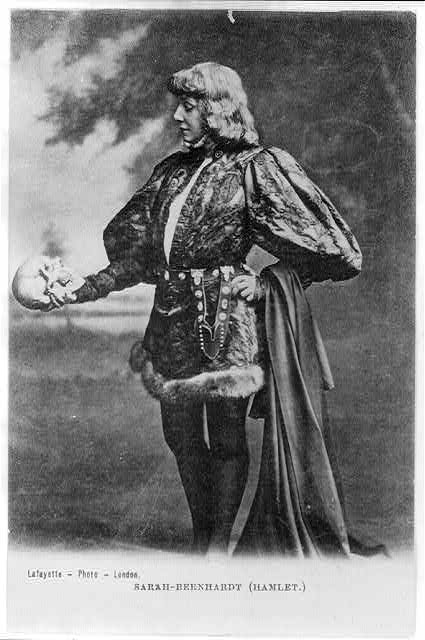
Sarah Bernhardt: the first actress (and actor of any gender) to portray Hamlet in a film, the 1900 short Le Duel d'Hamlet.

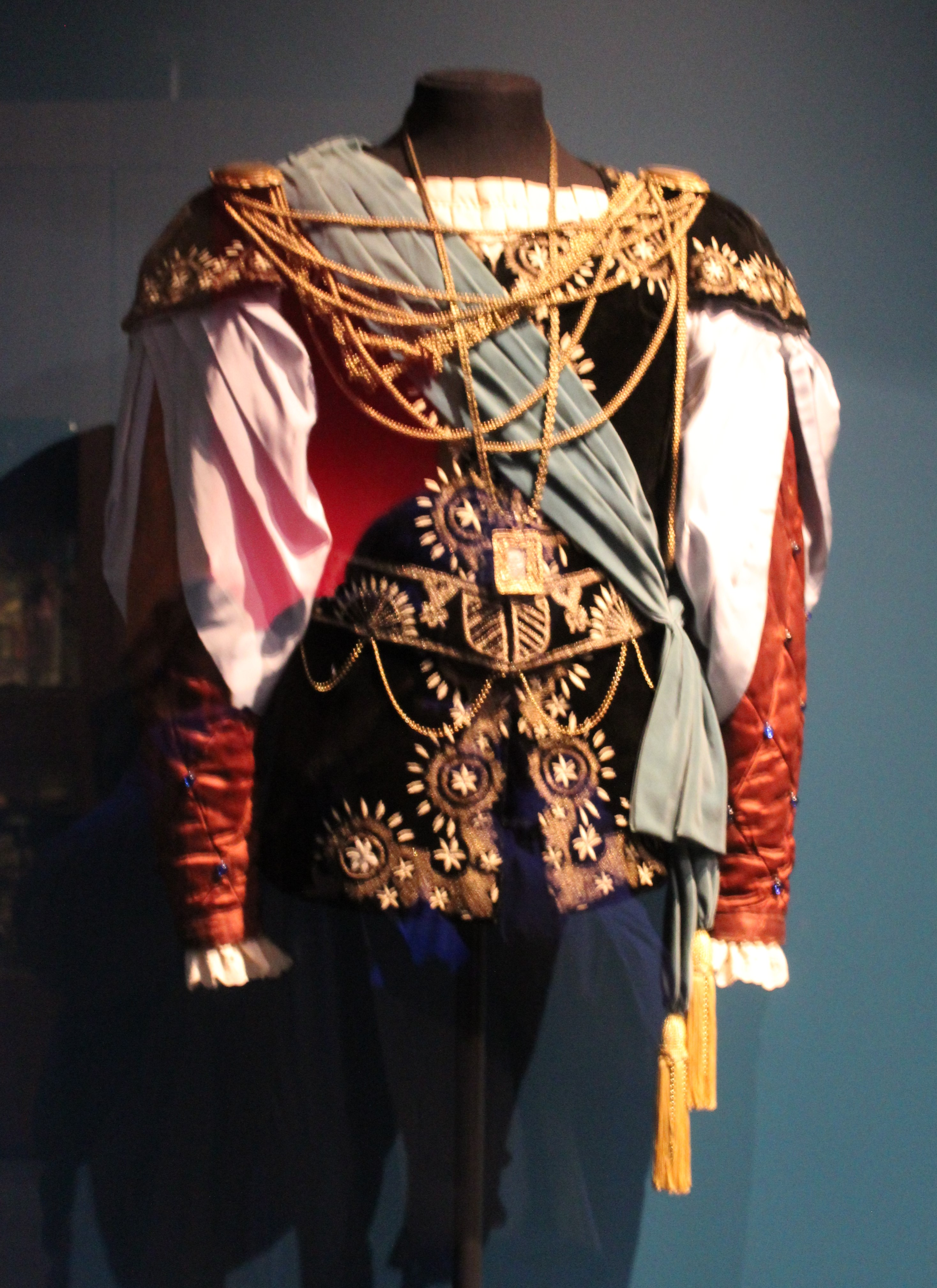
Costume worn by Laurence Olivier in the 1948 Hamlet, winner of the Academy Award for Best Picture.

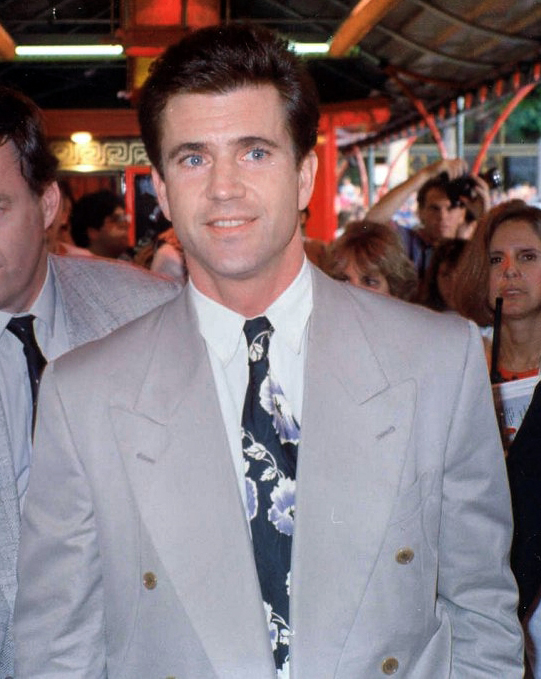
Mel Gibson in 1990, the year he starred in Hamlet.

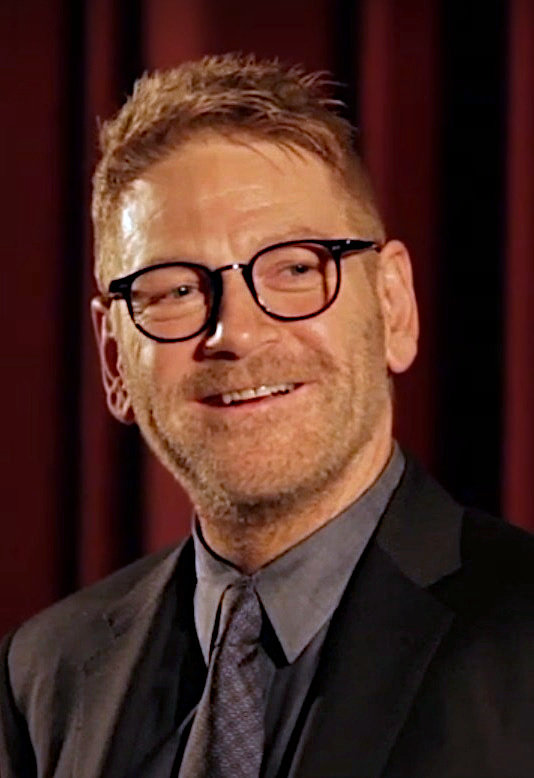
Kenneth Branagh, director and star of the 1996 Hamlet, the first film adaptation to contain the complete unabridged text of the play.

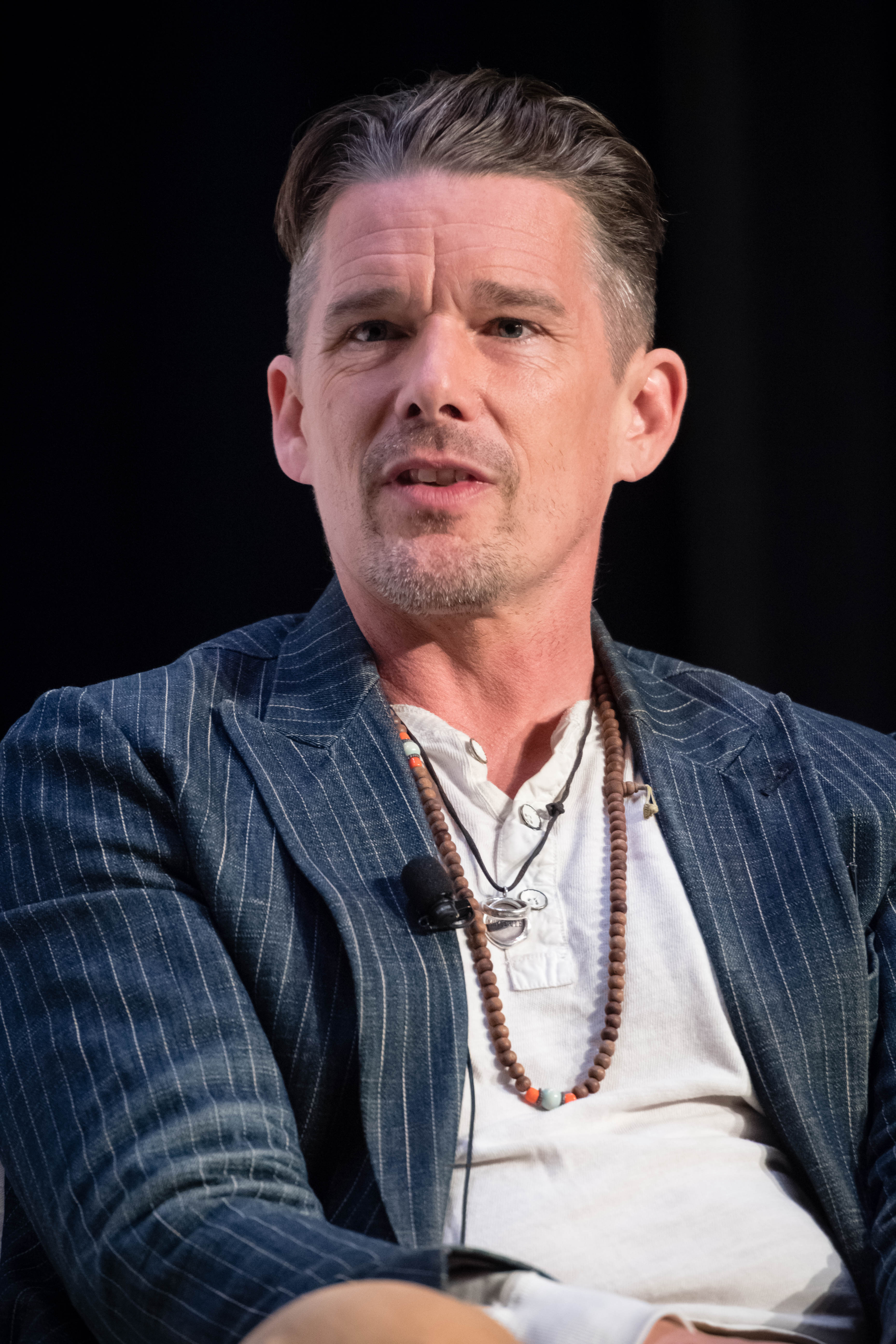
Ethan Hawke, star of the 2000 Hamlet, an adaptation that moves the setting to a major corporation in present-day New York City.

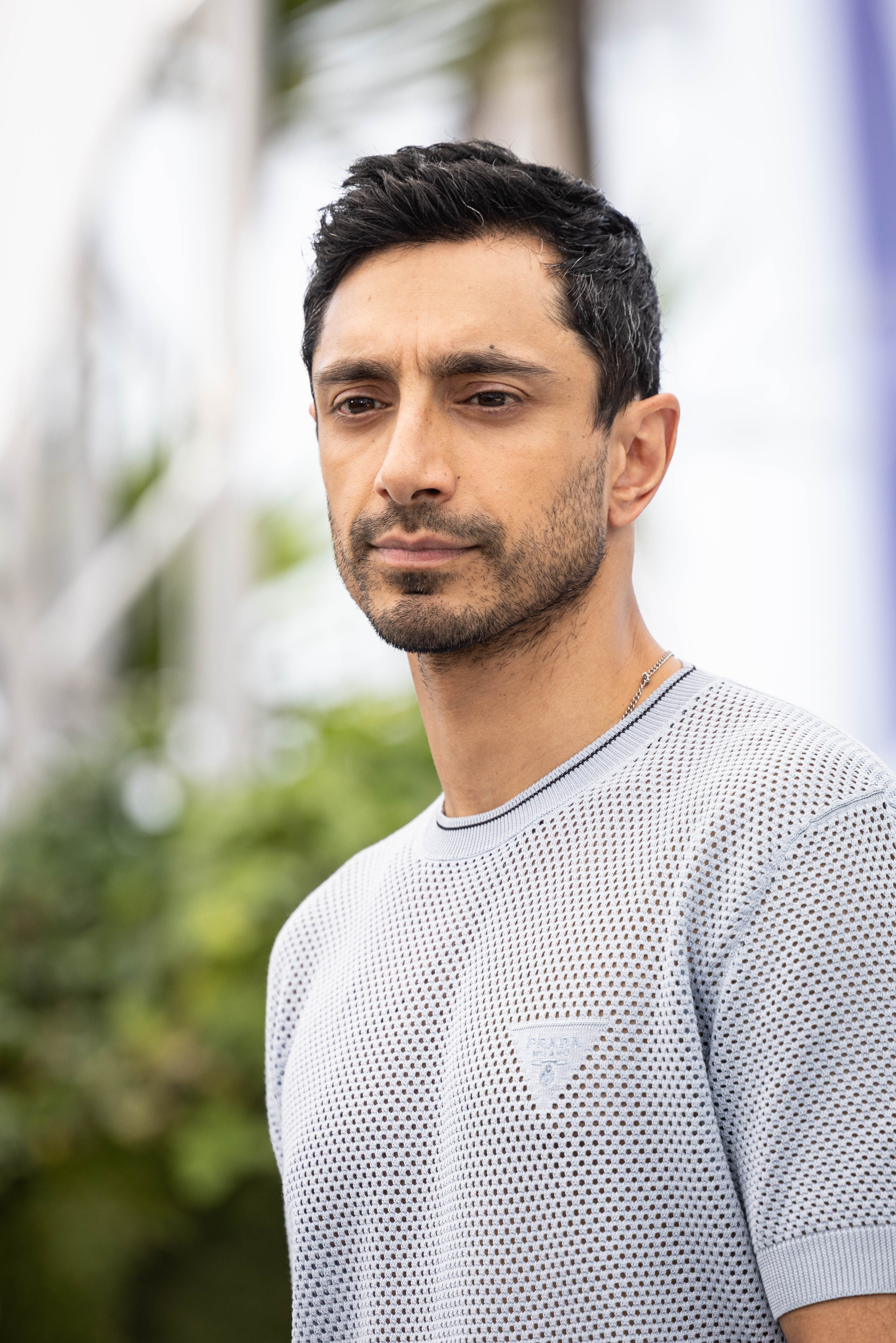
Riz Ahmed in 2025, the year he starred in Hamlet, an adaptation set in present-day London with a British Indian and British Pakistani cast.

Title	Format Country Year	Director	Hamlet	Other roles
Le Duel d'Hamlet	Short; France; 1900 (Note: A brief excerpt from the play, and its first known adaptation to screen; synchronized sound was provided by a simultaneously played phonograph cylinder recording.)	Clément Maurice	Sarah Bernhardt	Pierre Magnier as Laertes
Khoon Ka Khoon	Feature; India; 1935 - the first feature film of Hamlet with sound	Sohrab Modi	Sohrab Modi	Naseem Banu as Ophelia
Hamlet	Feature; UK; 1948	Laurence Olivier	Laurence Olivier	Jean Simmons as Ophelia; Eileen Herlie as Gertrude; Basil Sydney as Claudius; Felix Aylmer as Polonius
Hallmark Hall of Fame: Hamlet (live TV performance, preserved on kinescope)	TV; USA; 1953	Albert McCleery	Maurice Evans	Joseph Schildkraut as Claudius; Ruth Chatterton as Gertrude; Sarah Churchill as Ophelia; Barry Jones as Polonius
Hamlet, Prinz von Dänemark	Feature; West Germany; 1961	Franz Peter Wirth	Maximilian Schell	
Hamlet at Elsinore	TV; Denmark/UK; 1963	Philip Saville	Christopher Plummer	Robert Shaw as Claudius; Michael Caine as Horatio
Hamlet (aka Gamlet)	Feature; Russia; 1964	Grigori Kozintsev	Innokenti Smoktunovsky	Anastasiya Vertinskaya as Ophelia
Hamlet (filmed Broadway play)	ELECTRONOVISION; USA; 1964	John Gielgud	Richard Burton	Hume Cronyn as Polonius; Eileen Herlie as Gertrude; Alfred Drake as Claudius; John Cullum as Laertes
Hamlet (UK, 1969)	Feature; UK; 1969	Tony Richardson	Nicol Williamson	Marianne Faithfull as Ophelia; Anthony Hopkins as Claudius; Judy Parfitt as Gertrude; Mark Dignam as Polonius; Gordon Jackson as Horatio.
Hallmark Hall of Fame: Hamlet (shot on videotape)	TV; UK/USA; 1970	Peter Wood	Richard Chamberlain	Michael Redgrave as Polonius; John Gielgud as the Ghost; Margaret Leighton as Gertrude; Richard Johnson as Claudius; Ciaran Madden as Ophelia
Hamlet	UK; 1976	Celestino Coronado	Anthony and David Meyer	Helen Mirren as Gertrude and Ophelia
BBC Television Shakespeare: Hamlet (shot on videotape); Released in the USA as part of the "Complete Dramatic Works of William Shakespeare" series.	TV; UK; 1980	Rodney Bennett	Derek Jacobi	Claire Bloom as Gertrude; Patrick Stewart as Claudius; Lalla Ward as Ophelia; Eric Porter as Polonius
Hamlet	Feature; USA; 1990	Franco Zeffirelli	Mel Gibson	Helena Bonham Carter as Ophelia; Glenn Close as Gertrude; Ian Holm as Polonius; Alan Bates as Claudius
New York Shakespeare Festival: Hamlet (recorded on videotape)	TV; USA; 1990	Kirk Browning and Kevin Kline	Kevin Kline	Diane Venora as Ophelia; Dana Ivey as Gertrude
The Animated Shakespeare: Hamlet	TV; Russia/UK; 1992	Natalia Orlova	Nicholas Farrell (voice)	
Hamlet	Feature; UK; 1996	Kenneth Branagh	Kenneth Branagh	Kate Winslet as Ophelia; Derek Jacobi as Claudius; Julie Christie as Gertrude; Richard Briers as Polonius
Hamlet	TV; USA; 2000	Campbell Scott	Campbell Scott	Blair Brown as Gertrude; Roscoe Lee Browne as Polonius; Lisa Gay Hamilton as Ophelia; Jamey Sheridan as Claudius
Hamlet	Feature; USA; 2000	Michael Almereyda	Ethan Hawke	Julia Stiles as Ophelia; Kyle MacLachlan as Claudius; Diane Venora as Gertrude; Liev Schreiber as Laertes; Bill Murray as Polonius
Hamlet	Video; UK; 2003	Mike Mundell	William Houston	Christopher Timothy as Gravedigger
The Tragedy of Hamlet Prince of Denmark	Feature; Australia; 2007	Oscar Redding	Richard Pyros	Heather Bolton as Gertrude; Brian Lipson as Polonius; Beth Buchanan as Ophelia; Steve Mouzakis as Claudius
Hamlet	TV; UK; 2009	Gregory Doran	David Tennant	Penny Downie as Gertrude; Oliver Ford Davies as Polonius; Mariah Gale as Ophelia; Patrick Stewart as Claudius
Hamlet	Feature; Canada; 2011	Bruce Ramsay	Bruce Ramsay	Lara Gilchrist as Ophelia; Peter Winfield as Claudius; Gillian Barber as Gertrude
Hamlet	TV; UK; 2018	Robert Icke	Andrew Scott	Jessica Brown Findlay as Ophelia; Juliet Stevenson as Gertrude; Angus Wright as Claudius
Hamlet	Feature; UK; 2025	Aneil Karia	Riz Ahmed	Morfydd Clark as Ophelia; Timothy Spall as Polonius; Joe Alwyn as Laertes; Art Malik as Claudius; Sheeba Chaddha as Gertrude

== List of films inspired by Hamlet ==
This list includes adaptations of the Hamlet story, and films in which the characters are involved in acting or studying Hamlet.

- Oh'Phelia (UK, 1919) animated burlesque of the Hamlet story.

Anson Dyer, director

- To Be or Not To Be (USA, 1942) is the story of an acting company in 1939 Poland.

Ernst Lubitsch, director
Jack Benny as Joseph Tura
Carole Lombard as Maria Tura

- The Bad Sleep Well (aka Warui yatsu hodo yoku nemuru) (Japan, 1960) is an adaptation of the Hamlet story set in corporate Japan.

Akira Kurosawa, director
Toshiro Mifune as Koichi Nishi

- A Performance of Hamlet in the Village of Mrdusa Donja (Yugoslavia, 1974) Entered into the 24th Berlin International Film Festival.

Krsto Papić, director
Rade Šerbedžija as Joco / Hamlet

- Angel of Revenge/Female Hamlet (Turkey, 1977)

Metin Erksan, director
Fatma Girik as a female Hamlet

- To Be or Not To Be (USA, 1983) is a remake of the Ernst Lubitsch film.

Mel Brooks, director and as Frederick Bronski
Anne Bancroft as Anna Bronski

- Strange Brew (Canada, 1983), a comedy. Something is rotten in the Elsinore Brewery.

Dave Thomas co-director and as Doug McKenzie
Rick Moranis co-director and as Bob McKenzie

- Hamlet Goes Business (Hamlet liikemaailmassa) (Finland, 1987).

Aki Kaurismäki, director
Pirkka-Pekka Petelius as Hamlet

- Rosencrantz & Guildenstern Are Dead (USA, 1990) film based on Tom Stoppard’s stage play.

Tom Stoppard, director
Gary Oldman as Rozencrantz (or Guildenstern)
Tim Roth as Guildenstern (or Rozencrantz)
Richard Dreyfuss as the Player King

- Renaissance Man (USA, 1994) is the story of an unemployed advertising executive teaching Hamlet to a group of underachieving trainee soldiers.

Penny Marshall, director
Danny DeVito as Bill

- The Lion King (USA, 1994) Disney’s animated adaptation of the Hamlet story.

Roger Allers and Rob Minkoff directors
Matthew Broderick as the voice of Simba (the Hamlet character)
James Earl Jones as the voice of Mufasa (the Old Hamlet character)
Jeremy Irons as the voice of Scar (the Claudius character)
Moira Kelly as the voice of Nala (the Ophelia character)
Madge Sinclair as the voice of Sarabi (the Gertrude character)

- In The Bleak Midwinter (aka “A Midwinter’s Tale”) (UK, 1996) tells the story of a group of actors performing Hamlet.

Kenneth Branagh, director
Michael Maloney as Joe (Hamlet)
Julia Sawalha as Nina (Ophelia)

- Let the Devil Wear Black (USA, 1999)

Stacy Title director
Jonathan Penner as Jack Lyne (Hamlet)
Jamey Sheridan as Carl Lyne (Claudius)
Mary-Louise Parker as Julia Hirsch (Ophelia)

- The Banquet (China, 2006)

Feng Xiaogang, director
Zhang Ziyi as Empress Wan (Gertrude)
Daniel Wu as Prince Wu Luan (Hamlet)
Zhou Xun as Qing Nu (Ophelia)
Ge You as Emperor Li (Claudius)

- Karmayogi (2012)

V. K. Prakash, director
Indrajith Sukumaran as Rudran Gurukkal (Hamlet)
Nithya Menon (Ophelia)
Padmini Kolhapure as Mankamma (Gertrude)
Saiju Kurup (Claudius)

- Haider (India, 2014) Hindi adaptation set in Kashmir.

Vishal Bhardwaj, director
Shahid Kapoor as Haider Mir (based on Hamlet)
Tabu as Ghazala Mir- Haider's mother (based on Gertrude)
Shraddha Kapoor as Arshia (based on Ophelia)
Kay Kay Menon as Khurram Mir-Haider's Uncle (based on Claudius)

- Hemanta (2016)

Anjan Dutt, director
Parambrata Chatterjee as Hemanta Sen (Hamlet)
Payel Sarkar as Olipriya (Ophelia)
Gargi Roychowdhury as Gayatri Sen (Gertrude)
Saswata Chatterjee as Kalyan Sen (Claudius)

- Ophelia (UK/USA, 2018) tells the story from Ophelia's perspective.

Claire McCarthy director
Daisy Ridley as Ophelia
George MacKay as Hamlet
Naomi Watts as Gertrude
Clive Owen as Claudius

- The Lion King (USA, 2019) Disney’s remake of the animated adaptation of the Hamlet story.

Jon Favreau director
Donald Glover as the voice of Simba (the Hamlet character)
James Earl Jones (reprising his role) as the voice of Mufasa (the Old Hamlet character)
Chiwetel Ejiofor as the voice of Scar (the Claudius character)
Beyoncé as the voice of Nala (the Ophelia character)
Alfre Woodard as the voice of Sarabi (the Gertrude character)

- Sang-e-Mah (Pakistan, 2022) Urdu adaptation

Saife Hassan, director
Atif Aslam as Hilmand Khan (Hamlet)
Samiya Mumtaz as Zarsanga - Hilmand's mother (Gertrude)
Naumaan Ijaz as Haji Marjaan Khan-Hilmamd's stepfather (Claudius)

- The Northman (USA, 2022) tells the original story of Amleth that Hamlet is based on

Robert Eggers, director
Alexander Skarsgård as Amleth (Hamlet)
Nicole Kidman as Queen Gudrún (Gertrude)
Claes Bang as Fjölnir (Claudius)
Anya Taylor-Joy as Olga (Ophelia)

- Scarlet (Japan, 2025) is a fantasy anime including elements of the Hamlet story.

Mamoru Hosoda, director
Mana Ashida as the voice of Scarlet, a gender-flipped version of Prince Hamlet
Koji Yakusho as the voice of Claudius
Yuki Saito as the voice of Gertrude

- Hamnet (UK, 2025) is an adaptation of Maggie O'Farrell's novel fictionalizing Shakespeare's writing of Hamlet following the death of his son Hamnet

Chloé Zhao, director
Jessie Buckley as Agnes Shakespeare
Paul Mescal as William Shakespeare
Jacobi Jupe as Hamnet Shakespeare
Noah Jupe as Hamlet

- Elsinore (UK, TBA) dramatizes Ian Charleson's tenure as Hamlet in the months prior to his death.

Simon Stone, director
Andrew Scott as Ian Charleson

== See also ==
- Shakespeare on screen
- Cultural references to Hamlet

== Bibliography ==
- Berry, Ralph (2016). Shakespeare's Settings and a Sense of Place. University of Wales Press. ISBN 978-1-78316-808-8.
- Brode, Douglas (2000). Shakespeare in the Movies: From the Silent Era to Shakespeare in Love. Oxford: Oxford University Press. ISBN 9780195139587.
- Bruckner, D. J. R. (11 July 1999). "There Is Nothing Like a Dane". The New York Times.
- Cartmell, Deborah (2007). "Franco Zeffirelli and Shakespeare". In Jackson, Russell (ed.). The Cambridge Companion to Shakespeare on Film. Cambridge Companions to Literature (2nd ed.). Cambridge: Cambridge University Press. pp. 212–221. doi:10.1017/CCOL0521630231.013. ISBN 9781139001434 – via Cambridge Core.
- Coursen, H. R. (1986). "A German Hamlet". Shakespeare on Film Newsletter. 11 (1, 10th Anniversary Issue). The Johns Hopkins University Press: 4. eISSN 2638-3411. ISSN 0739-6570. JSTOR 44712464.
- Crowl, Samuel (2007). "Flamboyant realist: Kenneth Branagh". In Jackson, Russell (ed.). The Cambridge Companion to Shakespeare on Film. Cambridge Companions to Literature (2nd ed.). Cambridge: Cambridge University Press. pp. 226–242. doi:10.1017/CCOL0521866006.014. ISBN 9781139001434 – via Cambridge Core.
- Devasundaram, Ashvin Immanuel (2016). India's New Independent Cinema: Rise of the Hybrid. Routledge Advances in Film Studies. New York and London: Routledge. ISBN 978-1138184626.
- Drake, Sylvie (2 November 1990). "Kevin Kline's Hamlet Plagued by Stuffiness". The LA Times. p. 126.
- Ginestet, Gaëlle (2012). "Une femme douce by Robert Bresson: Hamlet or Anti-Cinematography". In Vienne-Guerrin, Nathalie; Dorval, Patricia (eds.). Shakespeare on Screen in Francophonia. Montpellier: University Montpellier III, Institut de Recherche sur la Renaissance, l’Âge Classique et les Lumières.
- Griffin, Alice Venezky (1953). "Shakespeare Through the Camera's Eye: Julius Caesar in Motion Pictures; Hamlet and Othello on Television". Shakespeare Quarterly. 4 (3). Folger Shakespeare Library: 331–336. doi:10.2307/2866756. eISSN 1538-3555. ISSN 0037-3222. JSTOR 2866756.
- Guntner, J. Lawrence (2007). "Hamlet, Macbeth and King Lear on film". In Jackson, Russell (ed.). The Cambridge Companion to Shakespeare on Film. Cambridge Companions to Literature (2nd ed.). Cambridge: Cambridge University Press. pp. 120–140. doi:10.1017/CCOL0521866006.008. ISBN 9781139001434 – via Cambridge Core.
- Hale, Mike (3 June 2010). "Off Broadway Vampires". The New York Times.
- Harvey, Dennis (21 April 2010). "Rosencrantz & Guildenstern Are Undead". Variety.
- Hill, Michael (2 November 1990). "Kevin Kline's new Hamlet on PBS is to be watched, not worshiped". The Baltimore Sun. pp. 57–60.
- Holden, Stephen (17 August 2001). "And Who Knew That Shakespeare Was a Southern Author?". The New York Times. p. E00008.
- Holland, Peter (2008). "Shakespeare abbreviated". In Shaughnessy, Robert (ed.). The Cambridge Companion to Shakespeare and Popular Culture. Cambridge Companions to Literature. Cambridge: Cambridge University Press. pp. 26–45. doi:10.1017/CCOL9780521844291.003. ISBN 9781139001526 – via Cambridge Core.
- Howard, Tony (2007). "Shakespeare's cinematic offshoots". In Jackson, Russell (ed.). The Cambridge Companion to Shakespeare on Film. Cambridge Companions to Literature (2nd ed.). Cambridge: Cambridge University Press. pp. 303–323. doi:10.1017/CCOL0521866006.018. ISBN 9781139001434 – via Cambridge Core.
- Jorgens, Jack J. (1991). Shakespeare on Film. University Press of America. ISBN 9780819181572.
- Keyishian, Harry (2007). "Shakespeare and Movie Genre: The Case of Hamlet". In Jackson, Russell (ed.). The Cambridge Companion to Shakespeare on Film. Cambridge Companions to Literature. Cambridge: Cambridge University Press. pp. 72–82. doi:10.1017/CCOL0521630231.005. ISBN 9781139001434 – via Cambridge Core.
- Lanier, Douglas (2007). "Intikam Melegi: Kadim Hamlet (Angel of Vengeance: The Female Hamlet)". In Burt, Richard (ed.). Shakespeares After Shakespeare: an Encyclopedia of the Bard in Mass Media and Popular Culture. Vol. 1. Westport, CT: Greenwood Press. p. 161. ISBN 978-0-313-33117-6.
- Lehmann, Courtney (2007). "Intikam Melegi: Kadim Hamlet (Angel of Vengeance: The Female Hamlet)". In Burt, Richard (ed.). Shakespeares After Shakespeare: an Encyclopedia of the Bard in Mass Media and Popular Culture. Vol. 1. Westport, CT: Greenwood Press. p. 89. ISBN 978-0-313-33117-6.
- McCarthy, Todd (5 December 1996). "Hamlet". Variety.
- McKernan, Luke; Terris, Olwen (1994). Walking Shadows: Shakespeare in the National Film and Television Archive. Archive Monographs. Vol. 2. British Film Institute Publishing. ISBN 9780851704142.
- Osborne, Laurie E. (1997). "Poetry In Motion: Animating Shakespeare". In Boose, Lynda E.; Burt, Richard (eds.). Shakespeare, the Movie: Popularizing the Plays on Film, TV, and Video. London: Routledge. pp. 103–120. ISBN 9780415165846.
- Quigley, Daniel (1993). "'Double Exposure': The Semiotic Ramifications of Mel Gibson in Zeffirelli's Hamlet". Shakespeare Bulletin. 11 (1). The Johns Hopkins University Press: 38–39. eISSN 1931-1427. ISSN 0748-2558. JSTOR 26353619.
- Rokison, Abigail (2009). "David Tennant on Hamlet". Shakespeare. 5 (3). Taylor & Francis: 292–304. doi:10.1080/17450910903138062. eISSN 1745-0926. ISSN 1745-0918.
- Rothwell, Kenneth S. (2004). A History of Shakespeare on Screen: A Century of Film and Television. Cambridge: Cambridge University Press. ISBN 9780521543118.
- Sokolyansky, Mark (2007). "Grigori Kozintsev's Hamlet and King Lear". In Jackson, Russell (ed.). The Cambridge Companion to Shakespeare on Film. Cambridge Companions to Literature (2nd ed.). Cambridge: Cambridge University Press. pp. 203–215. doi:10.1017/CCOL0521866006.012. ISBN 9781139001434 – via Cambridge Core.
- Taneja, Preti (2018). "Breaking Curfew, Presenting Utopia: Vishal Bhardwaj's Haider Inside the National and International Legal Framework". In Devasundaram, Ashvin Immanuel (ed.). Indian Cinema Beyond Bollywood: The New Independent Cinema Revolution. Routledge Advances in Film Studies. New York and London: Routledge. pp. 45–65. ISBN 9780815368601.
- Thompson, Ann; Taylor, Neil, eds. (2006). Hamlet. The Arden Shakespeare, third series. Vol. 1. Bloomsbury Publishing. doi:10.5040/9781408160404.00000005. ISBN 9781904271338.
- Tucker, Ken (2 November 1990). "Great Performances: Hamlet". Entertainment Weekly.
- Willis, Susan (1991). The BBC Shakespeare Plays: Making the Televised Canon. Chapel Hill, NC: University of North Carolina Press. ISBN 9780807843178.
- Wilson, Benji (20 December 2009). "David Tennant brings Hamlet to TV for Christmas". The Times.
