= Hamlet (1907 film) =

1907 film by Georges Méliès

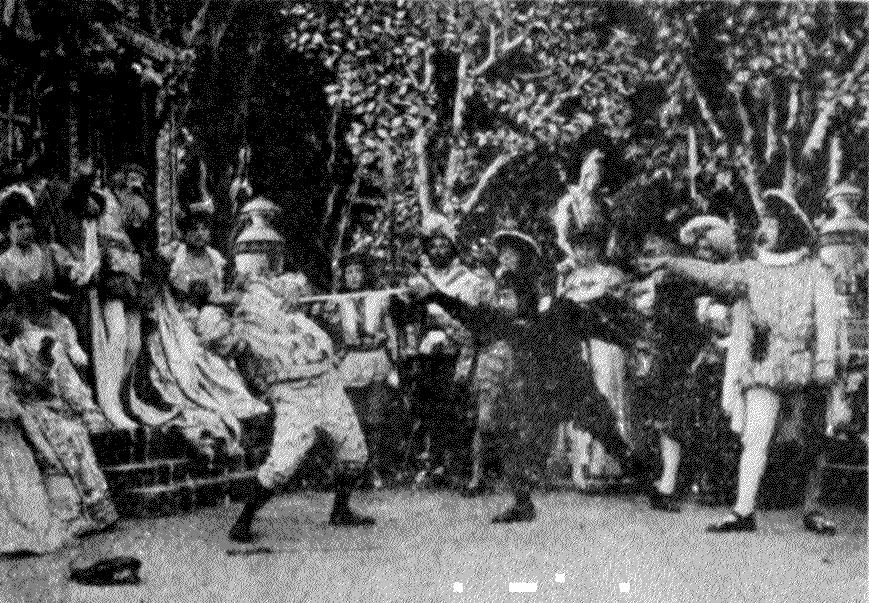
- Production still of the climactic duel
- Directed by: Georges Méliès
- Based on: Hamlet; 1599 play by William Shakespeare
- Starring: Georges Méliès
- Production company: Star Film Company
- Release date: October 1907
- Running time: 10 mins
- Country: France
- Language: Silent

Hamlet, released in the United States as Hamlet, Prince of Denmark, is a 1907 French short silent film directed by Georges Méliès, based on William Shakespeare's tragedy Hamlet. The film, now presumed lost, was the first cinematic version of any Shakespeare play to unfold across multiple scenes. In 175 m (574 ft) of film, it presented a character study of the mentally troubled Prince Hamlet, as seen in glimpses of several famous moments from the play: his encounter with the gravediggers and the skull of Yorick; his meeting with his father's ghost; his betrothed Ophelia, seen in a ghostly vision of her flower-throwing frenzy just before her death; and his final duel with its fatal aftermath.

Méliès, an early French filmmaker known for his innovations, made several films with Shakespearean themes; in Hamlet, he played the title character in addition to conceiving and directing the film. Scholars have highlighted Méliès's groundbreaking use of cinematic techniques to adapt Shakespeare's plot, as well as the adaptation's dreamlike pace and style.

== Plot ==
As gravediggers joke in a cemetery, the melancholy Prince Hamlet contemplates the skull of Yorick, whom he knew in life. This iconic scene is followed by a series of vignettes showing Hamlet's madness: in his room, he is haunted by hallucinations; he encounters his father's ghost, who exhorts Hamlet to exact vengeance on the current king, his uncle; and he sees a ghostly vision of his beloved, the now dead Ophelia, throwing flowers to him. Hamlet crumbles into demented raving, in which state he is discovered by some courtiers, who slowly calm him down.

Later, after an errand designed to keep him away from the court, Hamlet returns and fights a duel in front of the royal throne. After much fighting, Hamlet wins the duel; the king intends to kill Hamlet with a poisoned drink, but his mother drinks it instead and dies. Hamlet, waving aside the courtiers, kills the king and then throws himself on his own sword. As he dies, he reveals to the court the reason for his vengeance. The courtiers lay Hamlet's body on his shield, and carry him out on their shoulders.

== Cast ==
- Georges Méliès as Hamlet

== Production ==
The pioneering Parisian filmmaker Georges Méliès had multiple cinematic encounters with the plays of William Shakespeare. The first, his 1901 film The Devil and the Statue, had alluded to Romeo and Juliet by including a balcony scene and Venetian lovers called Roméo and Juliette. (An earlier Méliès work, the 1899 film Robbing Cleopatra's Tomb, is sometimes called simply Cléopatre, but it is not connected to Shakespeare's Antony and Cleopatra.) Méliès also dabbled in Shakespeare in his 1905 film The Venetian Looking-Glass, which incorporates the character of Shylock from The Merchant of Venice. However, these earlier films had merely borrowed elements from Shakespearean works; by contrast, Méliès's 1907 version of Hamlet was a true Shakespearean adaptation.

Méliès himself played Hamlet. Special effects used in the film appear to have included multiple exposures for Hamlet's ghostly visions.

The film was the first multi-scene cinematic adaptation of any work by Shakespeare. Later in 1907, Méliès made his last Shakespearean film, Shakespeare Writing "Julius Caesar", in which Méliès played Shakespeare himself.

== Release and reception ==
Hamlet was released by Méliès's Star Film Company, and is numbered 980–987 in its catalogues. It was registered for American copyright at the Library of Congress on 15 October 1907.

The film scholar Robert Hamilton Ball, in his study of Shakespearean silent films, highlights the ways in which Méliès adapted the story in order to tell it in truly cinematic language, a historically unprecedented achievement. (Earlier Shakespeare films by others had stuck to purely theatrical techniques, seeking merely to film scenes from the plays as they were performed onstage.) Ball comments: "It is easy to brand this ten-minute film an absurd simplification … but it was nevertheless a distinct advance over anything which had heretofore been achieved in Shakespeare film."

In his book Shakespeare, Cinema, and Society, John Collick compares Méliès's film to the Expressionist theatrical productions of Adolphe Appia and Edward Gordon Craig, saying that Méliès's use of "multiple exposures and dream-like Expressionist imagery … unconsciously recreat[ed] the spirit, if not the intention, of Appia's and Craig's ideas." Collick also highlights that by condensing the play into a brief succession of fragmentary scenes, Méliès was able to concentrate on the theme of madness in an artistically expressive way.

All told, an estimated forty-one film adaptations of Hamlet were made during the silent era. Like many of these, Méliès's version is currently presumed lost.
