= The Gravediggers =

Examples of Shakespearean fools, a recurring type of character in Shakespeare's plays

- Hamlet characters
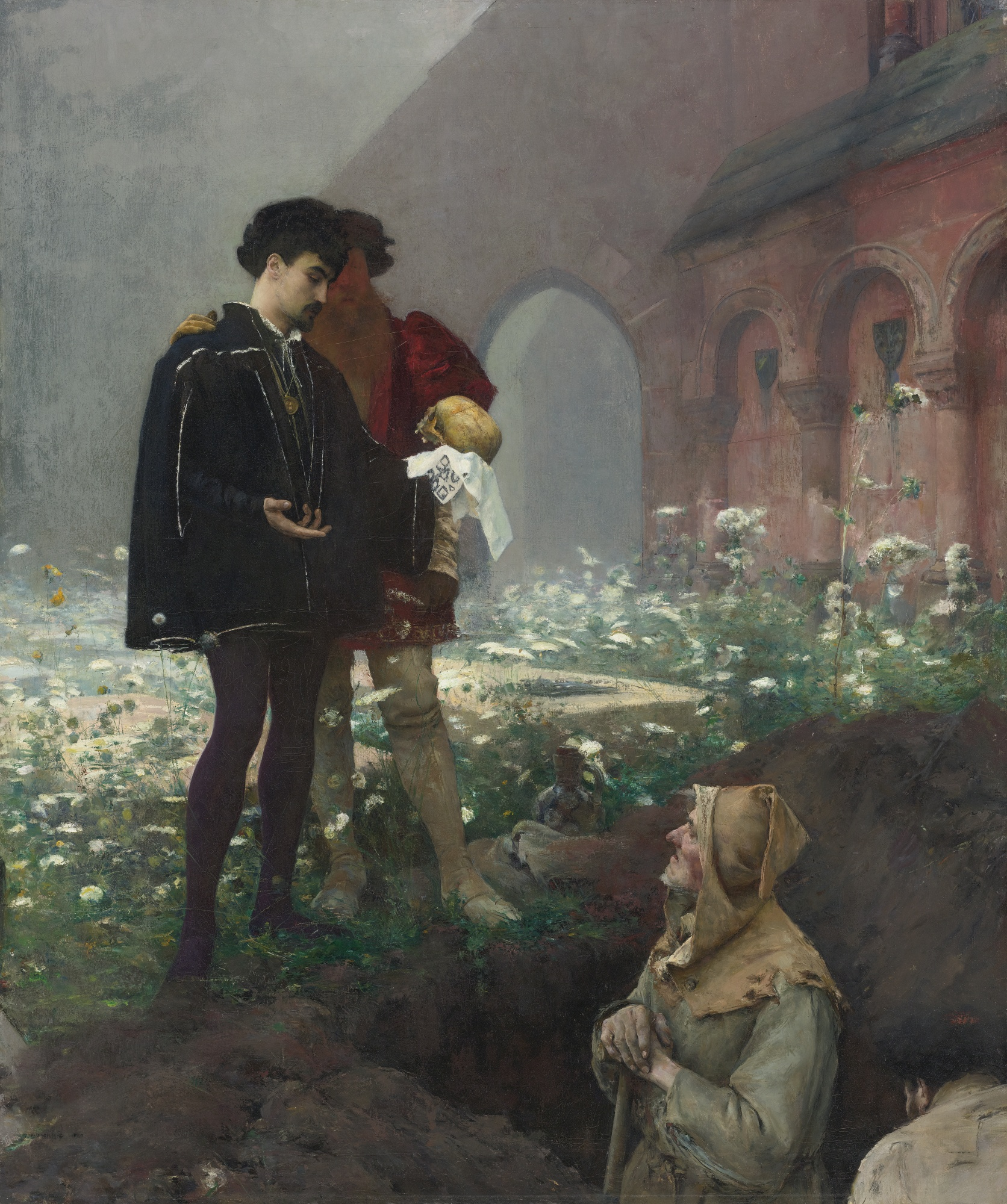
- Hamlet and the Gravediggers (Pascal Dagnan-Bouveret)
- Created by: William Shakespeare
- Portrayed by: Stanley Holloway; Roger Livesey; Trevor Peacock; Billy Crystal; Jeffrey Wright; Mark Hadfield

In-universe information
- Occupation: Gravediggers
- Nationality: Danish

The Gravediggers (or Clowns) are examples of Shakespearean fools (also known as clowns or jesters), a recurring type of character in Shakespeare's plays. Like most Shakespearean fools, the Gravediggers are peasants or commoners that use their great wit and intellect to get the better of their superiors, other people of higher social status, and each other.

The Gravediggers appear briefly in Shakespeare's tragedy Hamlet, making their only appearance at the beginning of Act V, scene i. They are first encountered as they are digging a grave for the newly deceased Ophelia, discussing whether she deserves a Christian burial after having apparently drowned herself. Soon, Hamlet enters and engages in a quick dialogue with the Sexton. The beat ends with Hamlet's speech regarding the circle of life prompted by his discovery of the alleged skull of his father's beloved jester, Yorick.

== Detailed summary ==
The penultimate scene of the play begins with the Sexton and a fellow Gravedigger digging a grave for the late Ophelia. They debate whether she should be allowed to have a Christian burial, because she committed suicide. This quickly leads them into a discussion of the impact of politics on the decision, and the two parody lawyer speech. They present Ophelia's case from both positions: if she jumped into the water, then she killed herself, but if the water effectively jumped on her, then she did not. The Sexton laments the fact that the wealthy have more freedom to commit suicide than the poor.

The pair get off the subject of suicide almost as quickly as they began it, however, as the Sexton begins to goad and test the Gravedigger, confusing him with the double meaning of the word "arms" (as in weapons and appendages). The dialogue between the two ends when the Sexton is unsatisfied by the answer to the riddle "What is he that builds stronger than either the mason, the shipwright, or the carpenter?" (V.i.39–40) that the Gravedigger gives, and consequently sends him off to bring back alcohol.

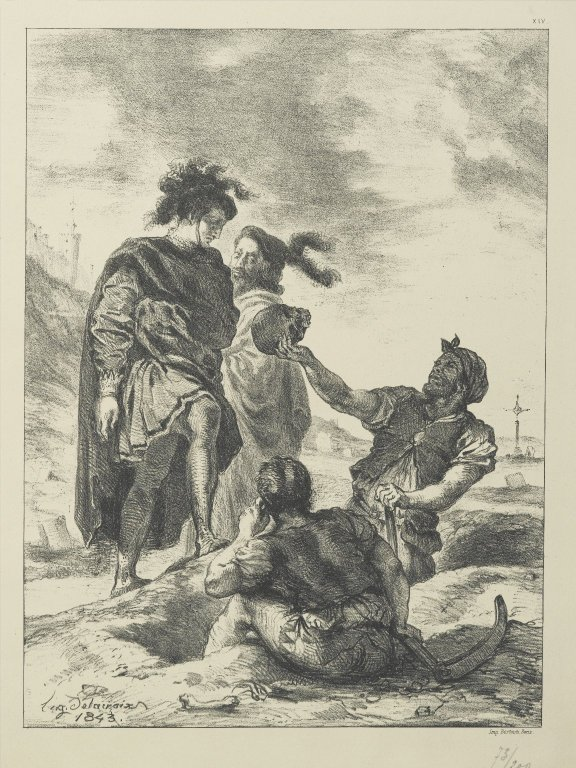
"Hamlet, Horatio, and the Gravediggers" by Eugène Delacroix.

The Gravedigger exits as Hamlet and Horatio enter, and the Sexton begins to sing a song on the topics of love and graves as he digs, throwing skulls up and out of the grave. Hamlet considers this behavior inappropriate and disrespectful towards what used to be someone's, and possibly an important someone's, body in such a way. He decides to ask the Sexton whose grave he is digging, but the Sexton evades the question with clever wordplay and riddles, changing the topic to that of Prince Hamlet (the Sexton fails, or pretends to fail, to recognize Hamlet) and his recent supposed bout of insanity. The Sexton then claims that one of the skulls belonged to Yorick, the king's jester and Hamlet's caretaker. Hamlet asks if this could really be so, and the Gravedigger responds with, "E'en that," (V.i.159), marking his last line in the play.

== Jokes ==
When together, the Gravediggers speak mainly in riddles and witty banter regarding death, with the first asking the questions and the second answering.

Sexton
What is he that builds stronger than either the mason, the
shipwright, or the carpenter?

Gravedigger
The gallows-maker, for that frame outlives a thousand
tenants. (V.i., 38–41)

And later in the scene:

Sexton
And when you are asked
this question next, say “A grave-maker.” The houses that
he makes last till doomsday. (V.i., 53–55)

== Songs ==
While digging Ophelia's grave, the Sexton sings to himself:

Sexton
In youth when I did love, did love,
Methought it was very sweet
To contract–o–the time, for–a–my behove,
Oh, methought, there–a–was nothing–a–meet. (V.i.57–58)

Sexton
But age with his stealing steps
Hath clawed me in his clutch,
And hath shipped me into the land
As if I had never been such.
(throws up a skull) (V.i.63–64)

Sexton
A pickax and a spade, a spade,
For and a shrouding sheet,
Oh, a pit of clay for to be made
For such a guest is meet.
(throws up another skull) (V.i.95–98)

Note: this song is full of reworkings or misquotes from Thomas Vaux, 2nd Baron Vaux of Harrowden's poem. "The Aged Lover Renounceth Love"

== Analysis of the scene ==
Many important themes of the play are discussed and brought up by the Gravediggers in the short time they are on stage. The manner in which these themes are presented is notably different from the rest of the play.

While the rest of the play is set solely in the fictional world of Hamlet's Denmark, this scene helps make sense of the themes by simultaneously bringing the focus to the audience's world. "By using recognizable references from contemporary times, the clown can, through the use of the oral tradition, make the audience understand the theme being played out by the court-dominated characters in the play."

For example, although the Sexton is definitely in the fictional world of the play (he is digging Ophelia's grave), he also asks his fellow to "go, get thee to Yaughan, fetch me a stoup of liquor". This does not appear in all versions and means little to us now, but it is "generally supposed that [Yaughan] was a nearby inn-keeper [to the theatre]". Likewise, the Sexton is in the same world as the English audience of the time when he jokes "...[insanity] will not be seen in [Hamlet] there [in England]; there the men are as mad as he". This gives enough of a distance from Elsinore [for the audience] to view what the clowns say as discreet parallels, not direct commentaries.

The literal graveness of the situation (the funeral) subsides to the humor. This makes it possible for the characters to look at the subject of death objectively, giving rise to such speeches as Hamlet's musings over the skull of Yorick.

The tone is set from the opening of the scene, during the Gravediggers' dialogue regarding Ophelia. Simply, they use her death to debate whether suicide is legitimate and forgivable according to religious law. This is not the first time that this question has been raised in the play. Hamlet has the very same discussion with himself during his "To be, or not to be" soliloquy in Act 3 scene 1. The characters in Act 5 scene 1 approach the topic this time with dark comedy, and in doing so bring up an entirely different theme.

The parody of legal jargon used by the pair of clowns continues the theme of the corruption of politics, as seen in the usurpation of the throne by Claudius (which should have belonged to prince Hamlet) upon King Hamlet's death.

The disintegration of values, morals, and order is a theme discussed at length in "Hamlet". The colloquial tone of the Gravediggers brings this philosophy into the focus of the audience's world. The synthesis of all perspectives used ends in a greater comprehension of the play as a whole.

Because Hamlet was written in the midst of England's Reformation, the role of religion was a contentious topic. Shakespeare was able to address religion and its relationship to suicide through Hamlet, discussing the legality of suicide through characters that have their own intention (i.e. to dig a grave) understood as separate from the author's intention.

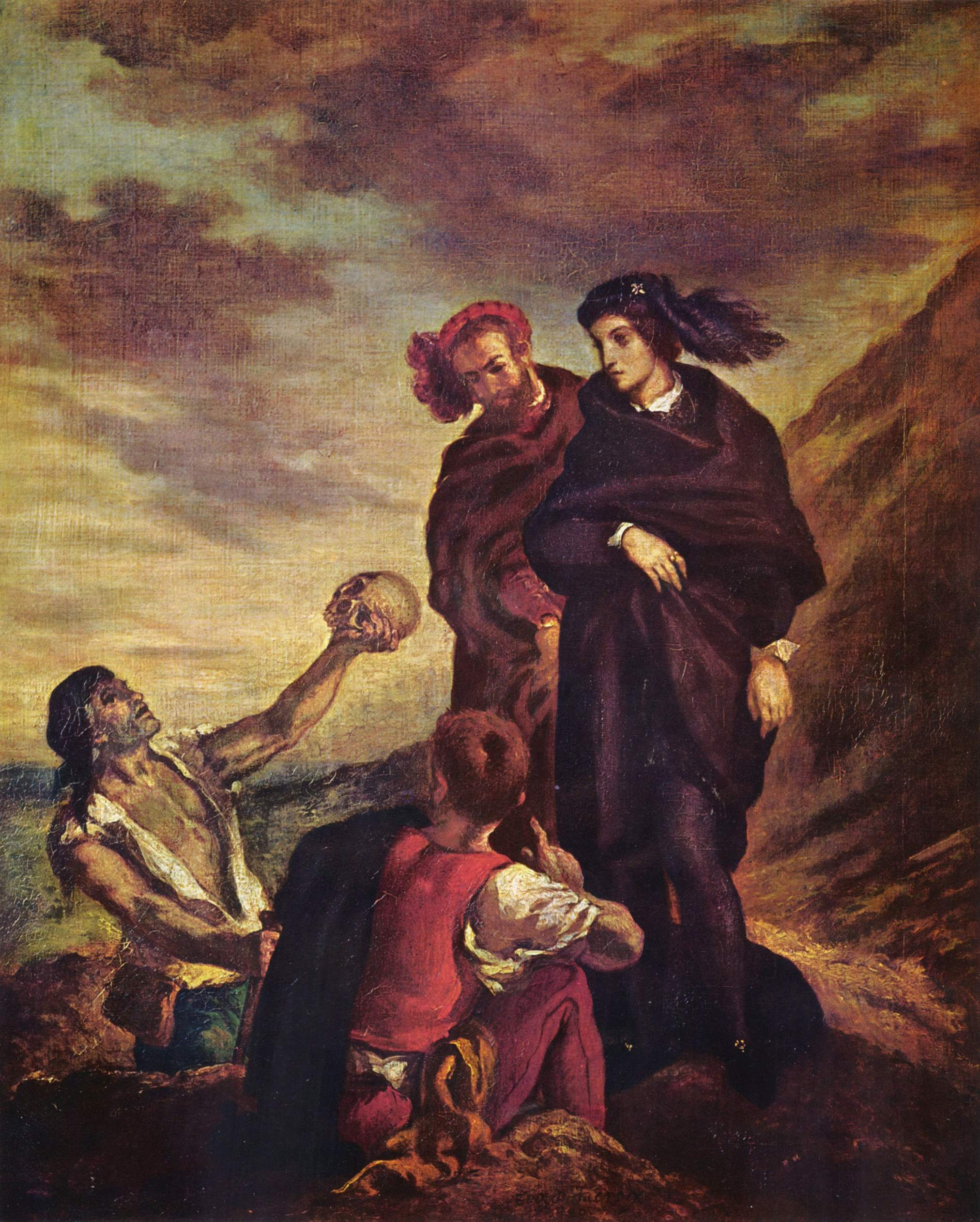
Hamlet and Horatio in the Graveyard.(Eugène Delacroix, 1839)

== Performance ==
During the Interregnum, all theatres were closed down by the Puritan government. Still, during this time playlets known as drolls were often performed illegally, including one based on the two clowns, called The Grave-Makers, based on Act 5, Scene 1 of Hamlet.

=== Film ===
In most of the movie adaptations of Hamlet, the part of the First Gravedigger (and at times the Second Gravedigger) is played by an extremely established actor or comedian. The following are the actors that portrayed the Gravedigger in the most notable cinematic productions:

- Stanley Holloway in Hamlet (1948), directed by Laurence Olivier
- Roger Livesey in Hamlet (1969), directed by Tony Richardson
- Trevor Peacock in Hamlet (1990), directed by Franco Zeffirelli
- Billy Crystal in Hamlet (1996), directed by Kenneth Branagh
- Jeffrey Wright in Hamlet (2000), directed by Michael Almereyda
- Mark Hadfield in Hamlet (2009), directed by Gregory Doran
