= Puebla de Sancho Pérez =

Coordinates: 38°23′50″N 6°24′00″W

- Coat of arms

- Location in Spain.
- Country: Spain
- Autonomous community: Cáceres

Area
  - Total: 56.7 km^{2} (21.9 sq mi)
- Elevation: 538 m (1,765 ft)

Population (2025-01-01)
  - Total: 2,634
  - Density: 46.5/km^{2} (120/sq mi)
- Time zone: UTC+1 (CET)
  - Summer (DST): UTC+2 (CEST)
- Website: www.puebladesanchoperez.es

Puebla de Sancho Pérez is a municipality in the province of Badajoz, Extremadura, Spain. It has a population of 2,880 and an area of 57 km^{2} (22 sq mi).

== Notable people ==
- Celestino Coronado Romero (1944-2014), film director

== See also ==
- List of municipalities in Badajoz
