= Hamlet (2011 film) =

- Film poster
- Directed by: Bruce Ramsay
- Written by: Bruce Ramsay
- Based on: Hamlet by William Shakespeare
- Produced by: Bruce Ramsay; Jacquie Gould; John Cassini
- Starring: Bruce Ramsay; Lara Gilchrist; Peter Wingfield; Gillian Barber; Duncan Fraser
- Cinematography: Michael C. Blundell
- Edited by: Lisa Robison; Franco Pante
- Music by: Schaun Tozer
- Production company: Hamlet Productions
- Distributed by: Breaking Glass Pictures
- Release date: October 11, 2011 (VIFF)
- Running time: 89 minutes
- Country: Canada
- Language: English

Hamlet is a 2011 Canadian drama film written and directed by Bruce Ramsay in his directorial debut. It is a condensed retelling of William Shakespeare's play Hamlet set in 1940s England. Ramsay stars alongside Lara Gilchrist, Peter Wingfield, Gillian Barber, and Duncan Fraser. It premiered at the Vancouver International Film Festival and was theatrically released in 2014.

== Plot ==
In 1940s London, Hamlet attempts to resolve the murder of his father.

== Cast ==
- Bruce Ramsay as Prince Hamlet
- Lara Gilchrist as Ophelia
- Peter Wingfield as King Claudius
- Gillian Barber Gertude
- Duncan Fraser as Polonius
- Haig Sutherland as Laertes
- Stephen Lobo as Horatio
- Russel Roberts as King Hamlet

== Release ==
Hamlet premiered on October 11, 2011, at the Vancouver International Film Festival. It received a limited release in January 2014.

== Reception ==
Rotten Tomatoes, a review aggregator, reports that 0% of five surveyed critics gave the film a positive review; the average rating is 2/10. Joe Leydon of Variety wrote that the film "seldom rises above the level of a good try" but may intrigue fans and scholars with the decisions made in compressing the narrative to 90 minutes. Nicolas Rapold of The New York Times wrote, "While Mr. Ramsay accomplishes some kind of a trick in streamlining the play, his trimming of corners feels more like a taking away of the center." Annlee Ellingson of the Los Angeles Times negatively compared its creativity to Much Ado About Nothing and called it "a focused, if at times melodramatic, take on the play's beating heart".
