= Hamlet and Horatio in the Graveyard =

Painting by Eugène Delacroix

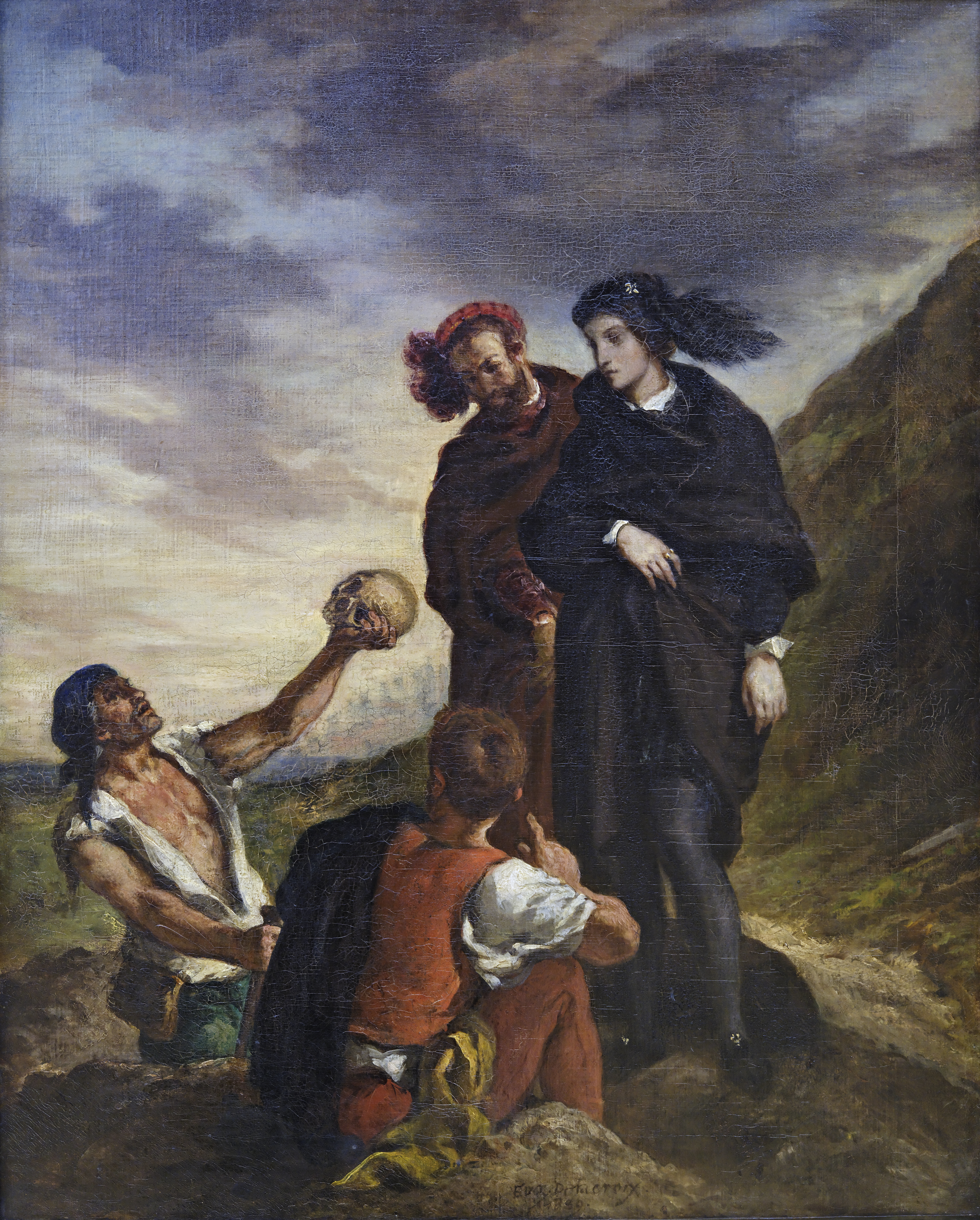
- Artist: Eugène Delacroix
- Year: 1839
- Type: Oil on canvas, genre painting
- Dimensions: 81.5 cm × 65.4 cm (32.1 in × 25.7 in)
- Location: Louvre, Paris

Hamlet and Horatio in the Graveyard is an 1839 oil painting by the French artist Eugène Delacroix. It is inspired by a scene from William Shakespeare's Elizabethan tragedy Hamlet. Two gravediggers preparing for the burial of Ophelia, unearth the skull of the court jester Yorick in front of Hamlet and his close friend Horatio. The subject reflects a fascination in French Romanticism for British literature and Shakespeare in particular.

The painting was exhibited at the Salon of 1839 held at the Louvre in Paris and again at the Salon of 1855. In 1843 a lithograph was produced based on the painting, with some alterations. Today the original painting is in the collection of the Louvre, having been acquired in 1884.

== Bibliography ==
- Allard, Sébastien & Fabre, Côme. Delacroix. Metropolitan Museum of Art, 2018.
- Sitzia, Emilie. Art in Literature, Literature in Art in 19th Century France. Cambridge Scholars Publishing, 2011.
