= Horatio (Hamlet) =

Character in Hamlet

- Hamlet character
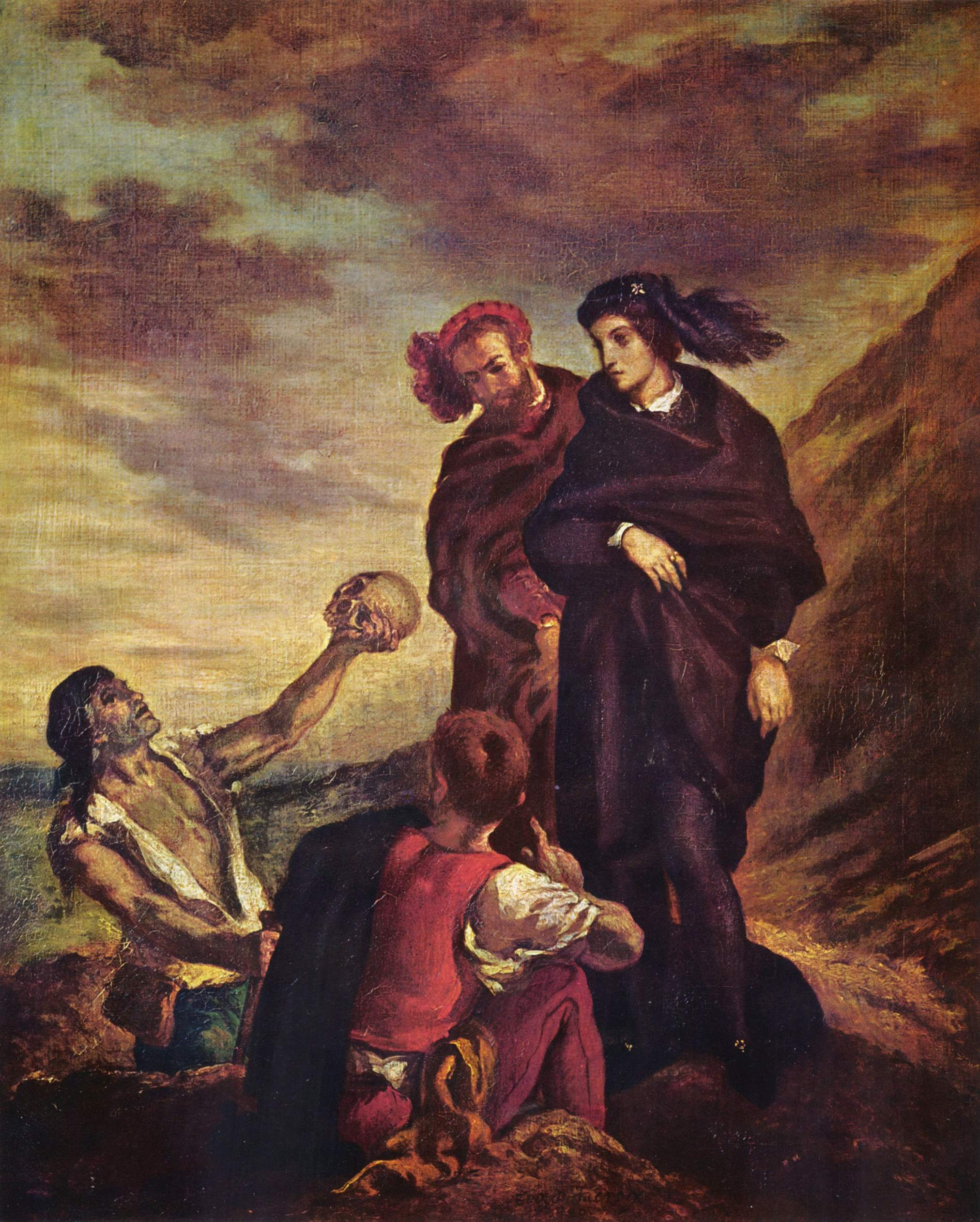
- Horatio (standing, dressed in red) with Hamlet in the "gravedigger scene". Hamlet and Horatio in the Graveyard by Eugène Delacroix, 1839
- Created by: William Shakespeare
- Portrayed by: Norman Wooland; Karl Michael Vogler; Gordon Jackson; Stephen Dillane; Nicholas Farrell; Karl Geary; Stephen Lobo; Konstantin Khokhlov; Robert Milli; Peter de Jersey

In-universe information
- Affiliation: Loyal to Hamlet
- Nationality: Danish

Horatio is a character in William Shakespeare's tragedy Hamlet.

Horatio knows how old King Hamlet appeared in battle: "Such was the very armor he had on when he th'ambitious Norway combated, so frowned he once, when in an angry parle, he smote the sledded Pollacks on the ice" (Act 1) Horatio could know this from tapestries, reenactments, and other artwork. He tells Hamlet he has travelled to court from the University of Wittenberg (where he was familiar with Prince Hamlet) for the funeral of King Hamlet. Hamlet is surprised to see him, and Horatio remains at court without official appointment, simply as "Hamlet's friend". He is on relatively familiar terms with other characters. For example, when Gertrude (the queen) is reluctant to admit the "distract" Ophelia, she changes her mind following Horatio's advice. Hamlet has departed for England by this point, and is not supposed to return.

Horatio makes a good foil and sounding board for Hamlet. Being from Wittenberg, a university that defined the institutional switch from theology to humanism, Horatio epitomizes the early modern fusion of Stoic and Protestant rationality.

== Name ==
The name Horatio is a variation of the Latin Horatius. Commentators including Freddie Rokem have linked the name to the Latin words ratiō ("reason") and ōrātiō ("speech"), noting his role as a reasoner with Prince Hamlet, and surviving (even though he begged for death) to tell Hamlet's heroic tale at the end of the play.

== Role in the play ==
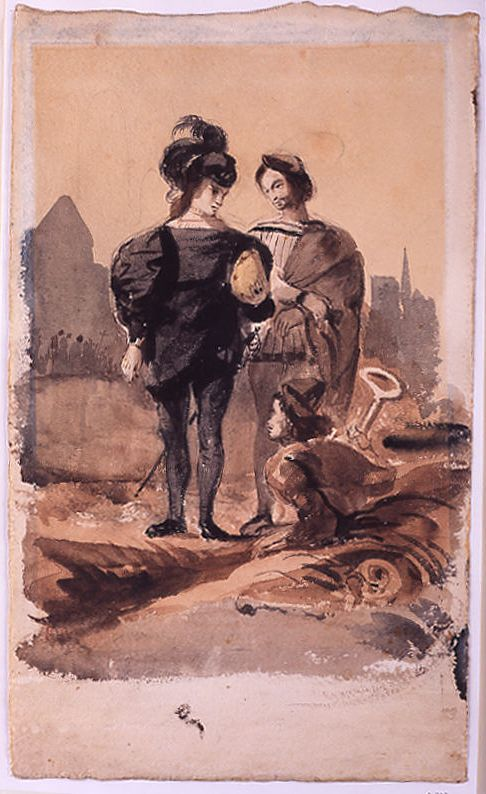
Hamlet and Horatio in the Graveyard (Eugène Delacroix, 1827–28)

Horatio is present in the first scene of the play, accompanying Barnardo and Marcellus on watch duty, for they claim to have "twice seen" the ghost of King Hamlet. He is initially skeptical, but is "harrow[ed] [...] with fear and wonder" when he sees the ghost. Being a scholar, he is urged to speak to the ghost. It is Horatio's idea to tell Hamlet about the ghost, supposing that "This spirit, dumb to us, will speak to him".

Horatio swears secrecy pertaining to the ghost and Hamlet's "antic disposition". He is privy to much of Hamlet's thinking, and symbolizes the ultimate faithful friend. In Act Three, Hamlet confesses his very high opinion of Horatio. Horatio is the first main character to know of Hamlet's return to Denmark. Horatio only doubts Hamlet's judgement once, when Hamlet has arranged for Rosencrantz and Guildenstern to be killed. Otherwise, Horatio supports every decision Hamlet makes.

Horatio is present through most of the major scenes of the play, but Hamlet is usually the only person to acknowledge him. When other characters address him, they are almost always telling him to leave. He is often in scenes remembered as soliloquies, such as Hamlet's famous scene with Yorick's skull. He is present during the mousetrap play, and when Ophelia's madness is revealed, and when Hamlet reveals himself at Ophelia's grave, and in the final scene. Near the end of the play, when Hamlet tells him "how ill all’s here about my heart", he suggests that Hamlet obey that ill feeling, but Hamlet is determined to keep his promise to his dead father-king. Horatio is the only main character to survive. He does intend to poison himself, saying that he is "more an antique Roman than a Dane", but Hamlet, dying, implores him rather to deal with the fallout and "wounded name":

If thou didst ever hold me in thy heart,
Absent thee from felicity a while,
And in this harsh world draw thy breath in pain
To tell my story.

Horatio's role, though secondary, is central to the drama. Through his role of 'outside observer', he makes the audience believe Hamlet's actions, no matter how incredible they may look to readers at first sight. For example, Horatio sees the Ghost, so the audience is led to believe that the Ghost is real.
