= Gillian Barber =

Canadian actress

- Born: 22 February 1958 (age 68); Coventry, Warwickshire, England
- Education: Guildhall School of Music and Drama
- Occupation: Actress
- Years active: 1985–present

Gillian Barber (born 22 February 1958) is an English-born Canadian actress.

== Early life and education ==
Barber was born in Coventry, Warwickshire, England, and raised in British Columbia, Canada. She studied at the Guildhall School of Music and Drama in London, and BFA program in the University of Victoria.

== Career ==
Barber appeared in films such as The Stepfather, Needful Things, and Jumanji; in TV series such as The X-Files and Stargate SG-1; and in TV animations Sabrina: The Animated Series and Adventures from the Book of Virtues as voice actress.

Barber also teaches at Capilano University, British Columbia, and created the Musical Theatre program in 2007.

== Filmography ==
=== Films ===
Year	Title	Role	Notes
1987	The Stepfather	Annie Barnes	
1990	Short Time	Nurse	
1992	North of Pittsburgh	Secretary	
1992	Impolite	Voice on the Phone	
1993	Needful Things	Myrtle Keeton	
1994	Double Cross	Coroner	Direct-to-video
1994	Max	Donna	
1995	Gold Diggers: The Secret of Bear Mountain	Grace Briggs	
1995	Jumanji	Mrs. Thomas	
1996	Maternal Instincts	Julie Taft	
1997	Bliss	Therapist	
1997	Kitchen Party	Barb	
1998	Disturbing Behavior	Judy Effkin	
1999	Double Jeopardy	Rebecca Tingely	
2000	The Guilty	Maddy Corrigan	
2000	Suspicious River	Mrs. Schmidt	
2000	The 6th Day	Katherine's Doctor	
2001	Cats & Dogs	Factory Receptionist	
2002	Bang Bang You're Dead	Principal Meyer	
2003	Stealing Sinatra	Mary Keenan	
2003	My Life Without Me	Nurse #1	
2007	Hot Rod	Riot Singer	
2007	Beneath	Donna	
2009	2012	Cruise Ship Lady	
2011	Hamlet	Gertrude	
2015	Patterson's Wager	Madeline	
2018	Status Update	Mrs. Gregory	
2018	Idle Thoughts	Loretta	

=== Television ===
Year	Title	Role	Notes
1985	Brotherly Love	Ski Shop Clerk	Television film
1986, 1988	Danger Bay	Mother / Jean	2 episodes
1989	Wiseguy	Vivian Schneer	Episode: "All or Nothing"
1989	The Beachcombers	Donna Lansing	Episode: "Mystery of Blubber Bay"
1989	Bordertown	Julia Ashley	Episode: "Blood Fury"
1989	Matinee	Marilyn	Television film
1991	Neon Rider	Nurse	Episode: "Nowhere Fast"
1991, 1995	The Commish	Various roles	2 episodes
1992	Diagnosis of Murder	Susan Blankenship	Television film
1992	Street Justice	Drugdealer's Girlfriend	Episode: "Cros Fire"
1993	Whose Child Is This? The War for Baby Jessica	City Attorney	Television film
1993	Moment of Truth: A Child Too Many	Adoptive Mother	Television film
1993–1997	The X-Files	Various roles	4 episodes
1994	Birdland	Joanne Wiley	Episode: "O.C.D.P.D. Blues"
1994	The Man Who Wouldn't Die	Art Sycophant	Television film
1994	Robin's Hoods	Alice Lowry	Episode: "The Pawn"
1994	Someone Else's Child	Renata Reed	Television film
1995	Serving in Silence	Col. Koufalis	Television film
1995	The Other Mother: A Moment of Truth Movie	Mrs. Kramer	Television film
1995	Jack Reed: One of Our Own	Francine Hood	Television film
1995	Madison	Winnoma Masters	Episode: "Family Affairs"
1995–1996	Action Man	Additional voices	26 episodes
1995–2001	The Outer Limits	Various roles	3 episodes
1996	The Halfback of Notre Dame	Sister Mary Catherine	Television film
1996	Sliders	Nicole Mitchell	Episode: "Gillian of the Spirits"
1996	In Cold Blood	Bonnie Clutter	2 episodes
1997	Touched By Evil	Betty	Television film
1997	The Sentinel	Dr. Gladstone	Episode: "Red Dust"
1997	NightScream	Dr. Melville	Television film
1997	Poltergeist: The Legacy	Joan Warner	Episode: "The Devil's Lighthouse"
1997	High Stakes	Pediatrician	Television film
1997	Intensity	Chairperson	Television film
1997	Breaker High	Mrs. DuPree	Episode: "Chateau L'Feet J'mae"
1997	The Advocate's Devil	District Attorney	Television film
1997	Unwed Father	Case Walker	Television film
1997	Millennium	Mrs. Barbakow	Episode: "Monster"
1998	Alien Abduction: Incident in Lake County	Mom	Television film
1998	The Wonderful World of Disney	Mother Fitz	Episode: "Goldrush"
1998	I've Been Waiting for You	Eric's Mother	Television film
1998	Nobody Lives Forever	Ann Corley	Television film
1998	The Baby Dance	Nurse Nancy	Television film
1998	Dead Man's Gun	Flora Becker	Episode: "Winner Talk All"
1998	First Wave	Dr. Rita Hagen	Episode: "Hypnotic"
1998	The Color of Courage	Carol	Television film
1998, 2002	Da Vinci's Inquest	Various roles	2 episodes
1998–2002	Cold Squad	Various roles	4 episodes
1998–2004	Stargate SG-1	Various roles	4 episodes
1999	The New Addams Family	Mrs. Drysdale	Episode: "Morticia, the Decorator"
1999	So Weird	Mary Hollander	Episode: "Listen"
1999	Final Run	Mrs. Hofflund	Television film
1999	Nothing Too Good for a Cowboy	Kate McIntosh	Episode: "Deja Vu All Over Again"
1999	Sabrina: The Animated Series	Voice	8 episodes
1999–2000	Beggars and Choosers	Agt. Ramona Culling	5 episodes
1999–2000	You, Me and the Kids	Parent	6 episodes
1999–2001	Sherlock Holmes in the 22nd Century	Guest voice	26 episodes
2000	A Storm in Summer	Mrs. Parker	Television film
2000	The Fearing Mind	Mrs. Hogan	Episode: "Good Harvest"
2000	The Immortal	Isabel Anderson	Episode: "Bride's Kiss"
2000	Adventures from the Book of Virtues	Aurora	13 episodes
2000–2001	Mysterious Ways	Various roles	2 episodes
2001	A Girl Thing	Arlene	Television film
2001	Christy, Choices of the Heart	Catherine	2 episodes
2001	Los Luchadores	Lady Dubois	Episode: "Along Came a Spider"
2002	Beyond Belief: Fact or Fiction	Rena Dunne's Mother	Episode: "Room 245"
2002	Night Visions	Dr. Talbott	Episode: "Voices"
2003	Before I Say Goodbye	Therapist	Television film
2003	An Unexpected Love	Rita	Television film
2003	Out of Order	Lorna's Aunt	6 episodes
2003	D.C. Sniper: 23 Days of Fear	Audrey Duncan	Television film
2004	Jack	Vice Principal	Television film
2004	Smallville	Marianne Taylor	Episode: "Truth"
2004	The Collector	Sara Eklund	Episode: "The Ice Skater"
2004	The 4400	Dr. Roxanne Kern	Episode: "White Light"
2004	The Dead Zone	Dr. Surman	Episode: "Tipping Point"
2004	Huff	Sam's Mother	Episode: "Pilot"
2006	The Evidence	Susan Bober	Episode: "Wine and Die"
2006	The Amazing Extraordinary Friends	Professor Brainchild	Episode: "Dark Matter Rising pt. 1"
2006–2017	Supernatural	Dr. Hess / Mrs. Rourke	4 episodes
2007	Masters of Science Fiction	Dr. Goldstein	Episode: "The Discarded"
2007	Reaper	Therapist	Episode: "Leon"
2008	The Guard	Laura's Mother	2 episodes
2009	Fear Itself	Moonflower Dougdale	Episode: "Something with Bite"
2010	Always a Bridesmaid	Sheila	Episode: "So Hippie Together"
2011	Endgame	Renata Sevigny-Venturi	Episode: "The Caffeine Hit"
2011	To the Mat	Iris Dumont	Television film
2013	Cedar Cove	Donna Kirkland	2 episodes
2013	Witches of East End	Maura Thatcher	3 episodes
2014	Bates Motel	Dr. Helen Ginsberg	Episode: "Gone But Not Forgotten"
2015	The Christmas Note	Mrs. Schweiger	Television film
2016	The Romeo Section	Evelyn Sproule	2 episodes
2016–2018	The Man in the High Castle	Alice Adler	6 episodes
2018–2021	Chesapeake Shores	Deirdre Peck	7 episodes
2019	Unspeakable	Dr. Hannah Strawczynski	2 episodes
2021	Maid	Melody	2 episodes
