= Celestino Coronado Romero =

Spanish theatre and film director (1944–2014)

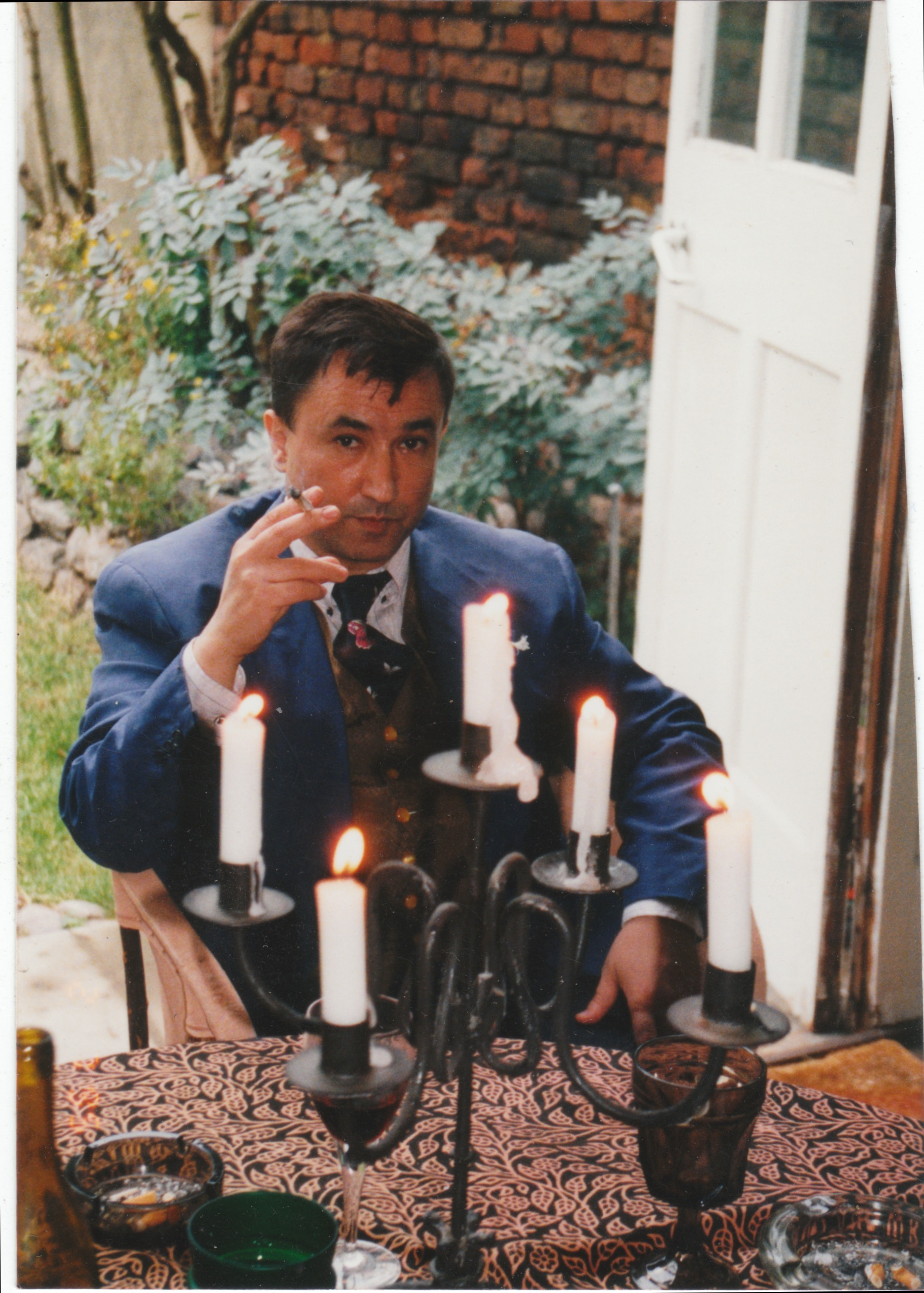
- Celestino Coronado in Brechin Place
- Born: 20 November 1944; Puebla de Sancho Pérez, Badajoz, Spain
- Died: 21 July 2014 (aged 69)
- Education: Royal College of Art, London
- Occupations: Theatre and film director

Celestino Coronado Romero (20 November 1944 – 21 July 2014), also known as Celestino Coronado, was a Spanish film and theatre director, writer, dancer and performer who lived most of his life in London. He was artistic director of the Lindsay Kemp Company from 1973 to 1985. He founded Cabochon Film Productions with David Meyer and also collaborated with The Incredible Orlando (blind actor Jack Birkett) and with Chilean composer Carlos Miranda.

== Life and career ==
He was born in Puebla de Sancho Pérez, Badajoz, Extremadura, Spain. He moved to Madrid in his early twenties and later settled in London in 1967 for the rest of his life, living in a rented flat in Brechin Place, South Kensington, which had become legendary for his many friends and collaborators.

He studied cinema at the Royal College of Art (School of Film and Television) and graduated Master of Arts in 1976. He studied mime with Lindsay Kemp and soon became a collaborator in his company as artistic director, contributing to the creation of the shows Flowers, That's the Show, Legends, The Maids, Salome, Mr. Punch's Pantomime, A Midsummer Night's Dream, and Duende, fantastic poem for Federico García Lorca.

He also collaborated for the Rambert Dance Company with Lindsay Kemp and composer Carlos Miranda in the creation of the dance-theatre works The Parades Gone By (1976) and Cruel Garden (with choreography by Christopher Bruce - 1977, also in the film version 1982 directed by Colin Nears which won the Prix Italia Musica-1982.).

His RCA Diploma film Hamlet (1976) and A Midsummer Night's Dream (1984, after the Lindsay Kemp stage production, produced by Televisión Española (TVE)), were both premiered at the London Film Festival. A Midsummer Night's Dream also had a cinema release and was shown on Channel 4. He produced and directed video productions and Super 8 films based on stage shows, happenings and events; among these are his Super 8 film of Nijinsky, the fool (1982, produced by Teatro alla Scala, Milano) and a video production of the play Goodbye G.O.D. by Carlos Miranda with Jack Birkett (The Incredible Orlando) in 1987. In 1989, he directed a theatre production of the play Smoking Mirror by Chilean playwright Alfredo Cordal, and also directed a version on video.

== Last years and death ==
Coronado continued writing and conceiving several projects that failed to materialize. He suffered in his last years with poor mental health, and his sometimes confrontational public behaviour led him into encounters with the police. He died in July 2014, afflicted by colorectal cancer.

== Filmography ==
- The Lindsay Kemp Circus (1973)
- Miroirs (1974)
- Le Bel Indifferent (1975)
- Hamlet (1976)
- A Midsummer Night's Dream (1984)
- Smoking Mirror (1989)
