= Bruce Ramsay =

Canadian actor (born 1966)

- Born: December 31, 1966 (age 59); Montreal, Quebec, Canada
- Occupations: Actor, writer, producer, director
- Years active: 1987–present

Bruce Ramsay (born December 31, 1966) is a Canadian film, television and stage actor.

== Career ==
Ramsay's screen debut was opposite fellow Montrealer Elias Koteas in the film Malarek (1988). Ramsay and Koteas went on to appear in two other films together, Hit Me (1996), and Collateral Damage (2002). Ramsay's first lead in a major motion picture came when he was cast as Carlitos Páez in director Frank Marshall's film Alive (1993), the biographical survival drama based upon Piers Paul Read's 1974 book Alive: The Story of the Andes Survivors, which detailed the story of the Uruguayan rugby team that crashed into the Andes mountains.

In 2011 Ramsay made his directorial debut with Hamlet (2011). Ramsay also produced, wrote the adaptation, and starred as Hamlet. Hamlet premiered in competition at the Vancouver International Film Festival in 2011.

Ramsay appeared as the jaded house boy Carlucci opposite Michael Douglas and Matt Damon in Behind the Candelabra (2013), directed by Steven Soderbergh, about the last ten years in the life of pianist Liberace. Behind the Candelabra marked the second time that Ramsay had worked with Soderbergh. In 1995, Ramsay appeared in The Professional Man, part of The Showtime film noir series Fallen Angels, starring opposite Peter Coyote and Brendan Fraser.

He created, wrote, starred in and produced the 2022 CBC and BET series The Porter, about the railway sleeping car porters who created North America's first Black labour union, the Brotherhood of Sleeping Car Porters.

In 2026, he released his first novel Texting with a Gorilla.

== Selected filmography ==
- First Offender (1987, TV Movie)
- Pin (1988) as Teenager
- Malarek (1988) as Fred Malarek
- Jacknife (1989) as Corridor Student
- Street Legal (1991, TV Series) as Frank Travers
- Urban Angel (1991, TV Series) as Paul-Lawyer
- The Reckoning (1991, TV Movie) as Young Waiter
- To Catch a Killer (1992, TV Mini-Series) as Bragg
- Alive (1993) as Carlitos Páez
- Killing Zoe (1993) as Ricardo
- Dead Beat (1994) as Kit
- The New Age (1994) as Misha
- Blah, Blah, Blah... (1995, Short)
- Fallen Angels (1995, TV Series) as Paul
- Hellraiser: Bloodline (1996) as Phillip L'Merchant / John Merchant / Dr. Paul Merchant
- Curdled (1996) as Eduardo
- Hit Me (1996) as Del Towbridge
- Starstruck (1998) as Manny
- C-16: FBI (1998, TV Series) as Joshua Reese / Timothy Mann
- Bonanno: A Godfather's Story (1999, TV Movie) as Joseph Bonanno (Ages 17–27)
- Island of the Dead (2000) as Tony Matos
- Exploding Oedipus (2001) as Hilbert
- Shot in the Face (2001) as Jerry
- Collateral Damage (2002) as Brandt's Aide
- Looking for Jimmy (2002) as Puma
- Holes (2003) as Prosecutor
- Jericho Mansions (2003) as Eugene O'Donnell
- Timeline (2003) as ITC Tech
- Mob Princess (2003, TV Movie) as Vladimir
- Da Vinci's Inquest (2003, TV Series) as Sgt. Shaw
- Baby for Sale (2004, TV Movie) as Gabor Szabo
- Break a Leg (2005) as Other Actor at Bar
- Amnesia: The James Brighton Enigma (2005) as Carl Honeycutt
- G-Spot (2005–2009, TV Series) as Pedro Davidd / Stalker
- One Dead Indian (2006, TV Movie) as Kenneth Deane
- Veiled Truth: What Comes Around (2006, TV Movie) as Jake
- Indian Summer: The Oka Crisis (2006, TV Mini-Series) as John Parisella
- Babylon 5: The Lost Tales: Voices in the Dark (2007) as Simon Burke
- Si j'etais Toi (2007) as Daniel Harpin
- The Quality of Life (2008, TV Movie) as Earl Waverly
- Mothers & Daughters (2008) as Dinner Party Guest Bruce
- Supernatural (2010, TV Series) as Paul
- Riverworld (2010, TV Movie) as Francisco Pizarro
- Guido Superstar: The Rise of Guido (2010) as Officer Ginoble
- Doomsday Prophecy (2011, TV Movie) as Garcia
- Hamlet (2011) as Hamlet
- Behind the Candelabra (2013) as Carlucci
- Brick Mansions (2014) as Mayor
- 19-2 (2014–2017, TV Series) as Commander Gendron
- Cardinal (2017, TV Series) as Ray Northwind
- The Porter (2022, TV Drama Series) as Dinger
- The G (2023) as Rivera
