= Yorick =

Character in Hamlet

- Hamlet character
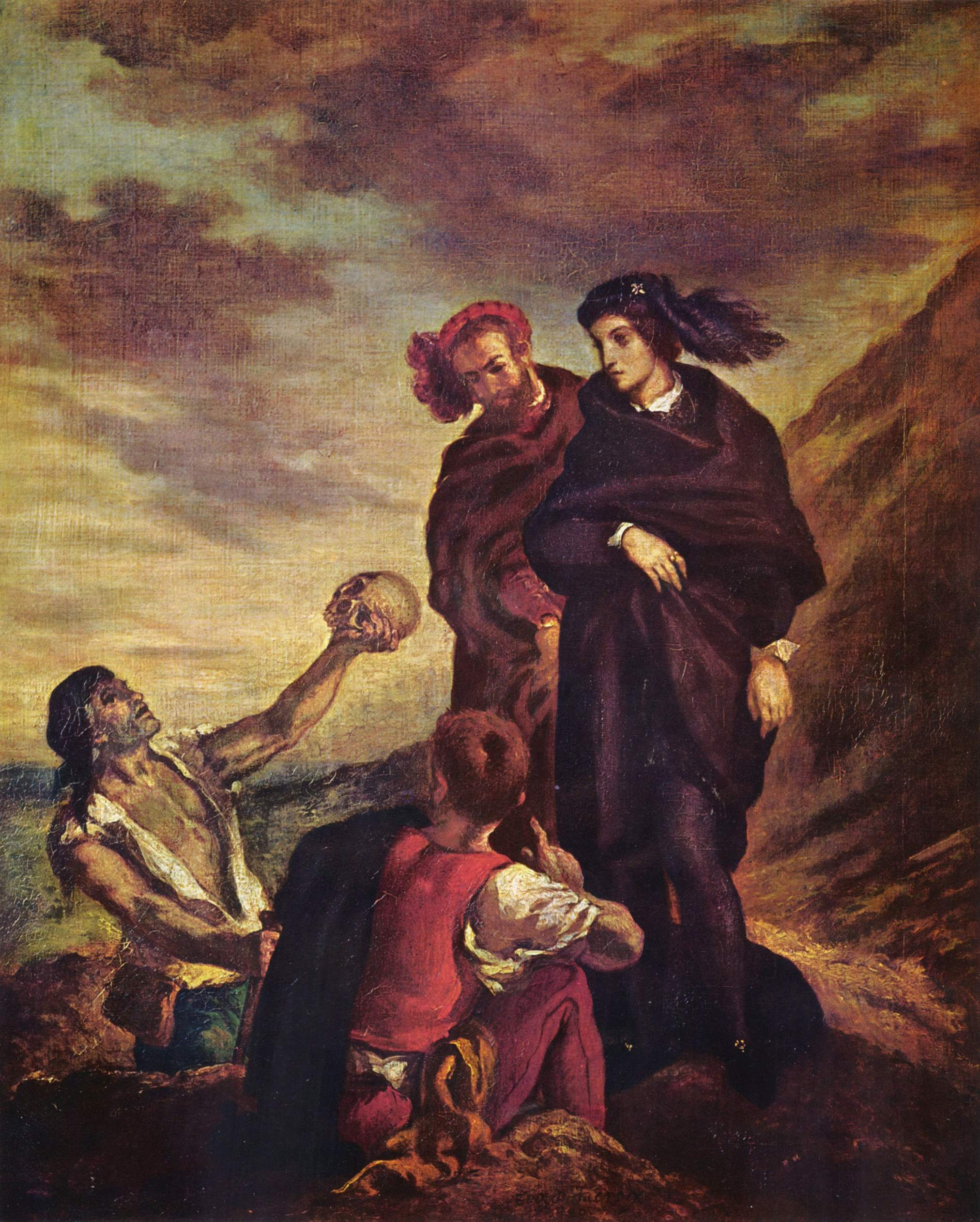
- Yorick's skull in the 'gravedigger scene' (5.1). Hamlet and Horatio in the Graveyard by Eugène Delacroix, 1839
- Created by: William Shakespeare
- Based on: Possibly Richard Tarlton and/or Hrœrekr Ringslinger
- Portrayed by: Fontaine; John "Pop" Reed; George Frederick Cooke; Juan Potomachi; André Tchaikowsky; Ken Dodd

In-universe information
- Occupation: Jester
- Nationality: Danish

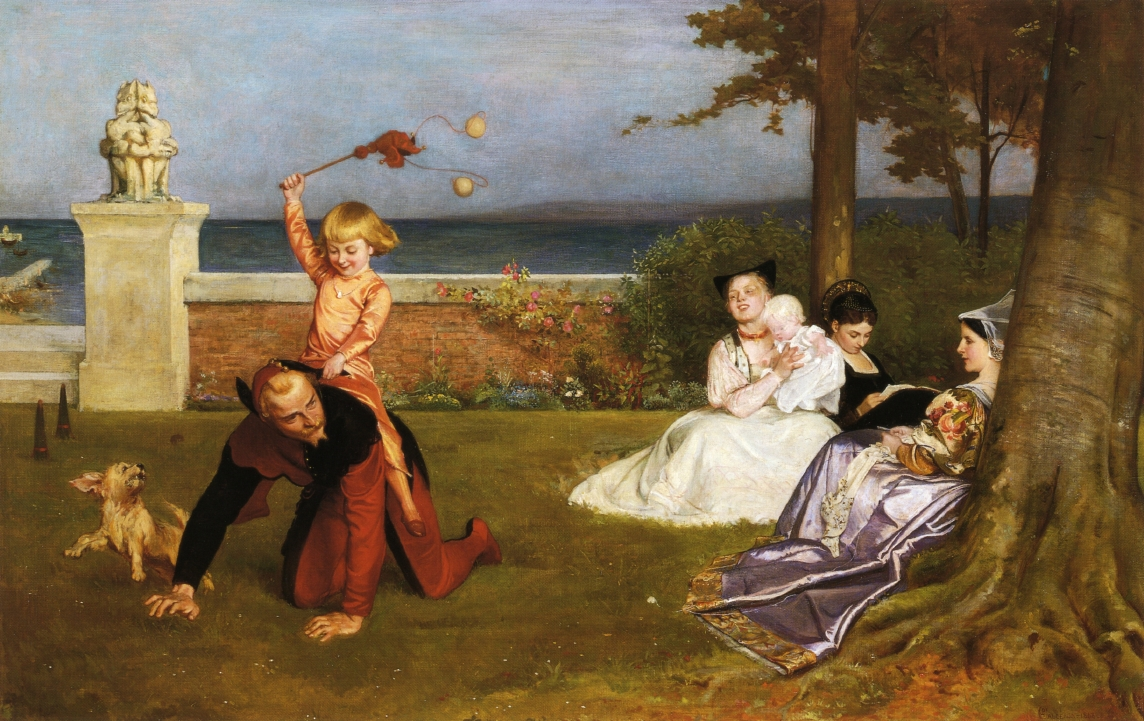
The Young Lord Hamlet (Philip Hermogenes Calderon, 1868), depicting a living Yorick bearing the young prince on his back.

Yorick is an unseen character in William Shakespeare's play Hamlet. He is the court jester whose skull is exhumed by the First Gravedigger in Act 5, Scene 1, of the play. The sight of Yorick's skull evokes a reminiscence by Prince Hamlet of the man, who apparently played a role during Hamlet's upbringing:

Alas, poor Yorick! I knew him, Horatio; a fellow of infinite jest, of most excellent fancy; he hath borne me on his back a thousand times; and now, how abhorred in my imagination it is! My gorge rises at it. Here hung those lips that I have kissed I know not how oft. Where be your gibes now? Your gambols? Your songs? Your flashes of merriment, that were wont to set the table on a roar? (Hamlet, V.i)

It is suggested that Shakespeare may have intended his audience to connect Yorick with the Elizabethan comedian Richard Tarlton, a celebrated performer of the pre-Shakespearean stage, who had died in 1588.

== Name ==
The name Yorick has been interpreted as an attempt to render a Scandinavian forename: usually either Eric or Jørg (pronounced [ˈjœrk]), a form of the name "George". The name Rorik has also been suggested, as Saxo Grammaticus wrote that this was the grandfather of Amleth, who served as the inspiration for Prince Hamlet. Alternative suggestions include the ideas that it may be derived from the Old Norse name of the city of York (Jórvík), or that it is a near-anagram of the Greek word Kyrios and thus a reference to the Catholic martyr Edmund Campion.

== Portrayals ==
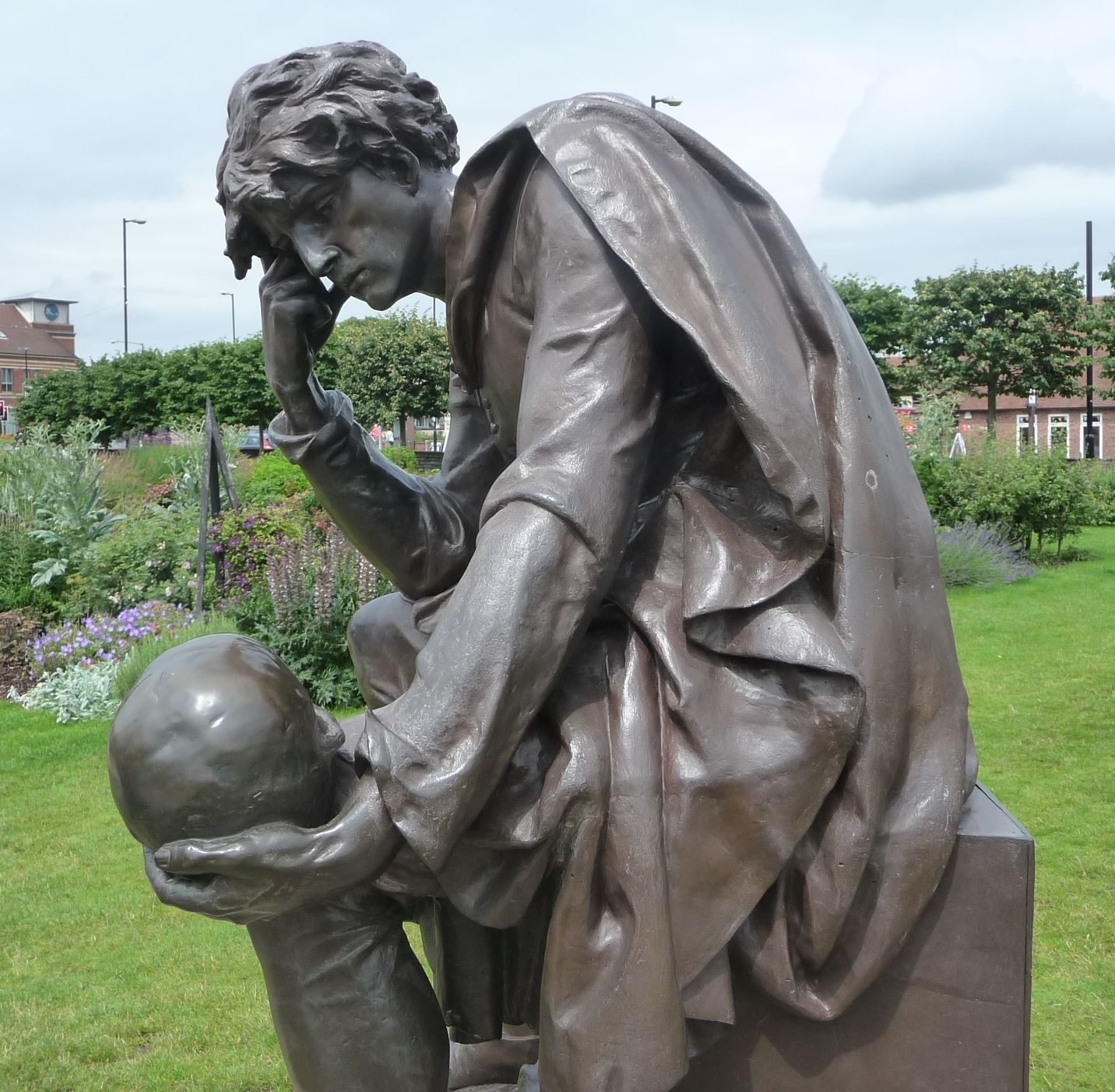
A statue of Prince Hamlet contemplating Yorick's skull in Stratford-upon-Avon.

The earliest known printed image of Hamlet holding Yorick's skull is a 1773 engraving by John Hall after a design by Edward Edwards, in Bell's edition of Shakespeare's plays. The image of Hamlet holding Yorick's skull has become a popular trope in media, becoming a metonymic symbol for acting and theatre as a whole. A bronze statue depicting Hamlet with the skull of Yorick is located in Stratford-upon-Avon, the birth town of William Shakespeare, and skull imagery is commonly used in souvenirs and artwork throughout the town. In theatrical productions of Hamlet, Yorick is typically portrayed with a fake skull. Skulls of Yorick have been made from materials such as wood, plaster, papier-mâché, fibreglass, and plastic. However, real human skulls have also been used for the role.

David Tennant used the cranium of pianist André Tchaikowsky for Yorick's skull in a 2008 Royal Shakespeare Company production.

Pianist André Tchaikowsky, who died in 1982, donated his skull to the Royal Shakespeare Company for use in theatrical productions, hoping that it would be used as the skull of Yorick. His skull was used during rehearsals for a 1989 RSC production of Hamlet starring Mark Rylance, but the company eventually decided to use a replica skull in the performance. In 2008, Tchaikowsky's skull was used by David Tennant in an RSC production of Hamlet at the Courtyard Theatre, Stratford-upon-Avon. It was later announced that the skull had been replaced, after it became apparent that news of the skull distracted the audience too much from the play. This was untrue, however, and the skull was used as a prop throughout the run of the production after its move to London's West End.

The skulls of other individuals have been used to represent Yorick in productions of Hamlet. Examples include a horse thief named Fontaine, whose skull was used by Junius Brutus Booth and Edwin Booth; John "Pop" Reed, a stagehand whose skull was donated to the Walnut Street Theatre; and George Frederick Cooke, whose skull was used, without his consent, for a production of Hamlet. In 1955, an Argentinian man named Juan Potomachi vowed to leave 200,000 pesos to the Teatro Dramatico in Buenos Aires on the condition that his skull be preserved and used for the role of Yorick – his request was granted.

American actor Del Close asked that his skull be used to represent Yorick. This did not happen because nobody was willing to decapitate him and prepare the skull. Charna Halpern, the executor of Close's will, donated a skull to the Goodman Theatre, but later admitted it was actually purchased from a medical supply company. Close's real skull was cremated with the rest of his body. Additionally, actors David Tennant and Jonathan Hartman have said they desire for their skulls to be used as Yorick after their deaths.

The symbol of Yorick's skull has become so iconic in theatre that it has occasionally been regarded as cliché, and some directors have sought to alter the scene. The production of Hamlet directed by Thomas Ostermeier, first performed at the Schaubühne in 2008, removed the scene with the gravediggers, instead alluding to Yorick with an image of a skull projected onto Hamlet's face. The Royal Exchange production starring Maxine Peake kept the scene, but replaced Yorick's skull with a sweater. In Kenneth Branagh's 1996 film adaptation, Yorick is seen alive, in flashbacks to Hamlet's youth, played by actor and comedian Ken Dodd.

== See also ==
- Characters in Hamlet
- Human skull symbolism
- Memento mori
