= List of William Shakespeare screen adaptations =

The Guinness Book of Records lists 410 feature-length film and TV versions of Shakespeare's plays, making Shakespeare the most filmed author ever in any language.

As of October 2026, the Internet Movie Database lists Shakespeare as having writing credit on 1,900 films, including those under production but not yet released. The earliest known production is King John from 1899.

== Comedies ==
=== All's Well That Ends Well ===
Title	M	C	Y	Directors	Starring	Description
All's Well That Ends Well	TV	(United Kingdom)	1968	John Barton (director), Claude Whatham (screen)	Lynn Farleigh (Helena); Ian Richardson (Count Bertram); Catherine Lacey (The Countess of Rousillon); Sebastian Shaw (The King of France); Clive Swift (Parolles); Caroline Hunt (Diana); Elizabeth Spriggs (A Widow of Florence); Brewster Mason (Lafew); Ian Hogg (Lavatch)	Originally a Royal Shakespeare Company stage production, this was the first Shakespeare play broadcast in color by the BBC. (Note: By BBC2 on 3 June 1968 at 21:00.) The second of its two reels is believed to be lost.
All's Well That Ends Well	Video	(United States)	1978	Wilford Leach	Pamela Reed (Helena); Marc Linn (Count Bertram); Elizabeth Wilson (The Countess of Rousillon); Larry Pines (Parolles); Frances Conroy (Diana); Barbara Williams (A Widow of Florence); John Ferraro (Lavatch)	A video recording of a 1978 New York Shakespeare Festival performance at the Delacorte Theatre, made by Jaime Caro for Theatre on Film and Tape.
"All's Well That Ends Well" (BBC Television Shakespeare)	TV	(United Kingdom)	1981	Elijah Moshinsky	Angela Down (Helena); Ian Charleson (Count Bertram); Celia Johnson (The Countess of Rousillon); Donald Sinden (The King of France); Peter Jeffrey (Parolles); Pippa Guard (Diana); Rosemary Leach (A Widow of Florence); Michael Hordern (Lafew); Paul Brooke (Lavatch)	
All's Well That Ends Well (National Theatre Live)	TV	(United Kingdom)	2009	Marianne Elliott	Michelle Terry (Helena); George Rainsford (Count Bertram); Claire Higgins (The Countess of Rousillon); Oliver Ford Davies (The King of France); Conleth Hill (Parolles)	Live performance broadcast from the National Theatre in London's West End.

=== As You Like It ===
Title	M	C	Y	Directors	Starring	Description
As You Like It	Silent	(United States)	1912	J. Stuart Blackton; Charles Kent; James Young	Rose Coghlan (Rosalind); Maurice Costello (Orlando); Rosemary Theby (Celia); Charles Kent (Jaques); Robert McWade Sr. (Touchstone); Harry T. Morey (Duke Frederick); Tefft Johnson (Duke Senior); Robert Gaillard (Oliver); Charles Eldridge (Corin); George Ober (Adam); Rose Tapley (Phebe); James W. Morrison (Silvius); Kate Price (Audrey)	The film brings stage star Rose Coghlan to the screen for her motion picture debut. At 61–62, Coghlan is an older Rosalind than usual. Filmed mainly outdoors.
Love in a Wood	Silent	(United Kingdom)	1915	Maurice Elvey	Elisabeth Risdon (Rosalind); Gerald Ames (Orlando); Vera Cuningham (Celia); Frank Stanmore (Touch-stone); Kenelm Foss (Oliver)	A silent comedy film in a contemporary setting of the play.
As You Like It	Film	(United Kingdom)	1936	Paul Czinner	Elisabeth Bergner (Rosalind); Laurence Olivier (Orlando); Sophie Stewart (Celia); Leon Quartermaine (Jaques); Mackenzie Ward (Touchstone); Felix Aylmer (Duke Frederick); Henry Ainley (Duke Senior); John Laurie (Oliver); Aubrey Mather (Corin); J. Fisher White (Adam); Joan White (Phebe); Richard Ainley (Silvius); Dorice Fordred (Audrey)	Olivier's first performance of Shakespeare on screen. It was also the final film of stage actors Leon Quartermaine and Henry Ainley and featured an early screen role for Ainley's son Richard as Sylvius, as well as for John Laurie, who played Orlando's brother Oliver. Laurie would go on to co-star with Olivier in the three Shakespearean films that Olivier directed.
As You Like It	TV	(United Kingdom)	1963	Michael Elliott (stage); Ronald Eyre (TV)	Vanessa Redgrave (Rosalind); Patrick Allen (Orlando); Rosalind Knight (Celia); Max Adrian (Jaques); Patrick Wymark (Touchstone); Tony Church (Duke Frederick); Paul Hardwick (Duke Senior); David Buck (Oliver); Russell Hunter (Corin); Clifford Rose (Adam); Jeanne Hepple (Phebe); Peter Gill (Silvius); Patsy Byrne (Audrey)	A recording of the Royal Shakespeare Company's 1961 performance for the BBC. In a 2015 retrospective for The Guardian, theatre critic Michael Billington praised Redgrave as having "the ability to give a performance [as Rosalind] that becomes a gold-standard for future generations".
"As You Like It" (BBC Television Shakespeare)	TV	(United Kingdom)	1978	Basil Coleman	Helen Mirren (Rosalind); Brian Stirner (Orlando); Angharad Rees (Celia); Richard Pasco (Jaques); James Bolam (Touchstone); Richard Easton (Duke Frederick); Tony Church (Duke Senior); Clive Francis (Oliver); David Lloyd Meredith (Corin); Arthur Hewlett (Adam); Victoria Plucknett (Phebe); Maynard Williams (Silvius); Marilyn Le Conte (Audrey)	Recorded at Glamis Castle in Scotland, this was one of only two productions shot on location, the other being The Famous History of the Life of Henry the Eight. However, the location shooting received a lukewarm response from both critics and the BBC's own people, with the general consensus being that the natural world in the episode overwhelmed the actors and the story. Director Basil Coleman initially felt that the play should be filmed over the course of a year, with the change in seasons from winter to summer marking the ideological change in the characters, but he was forced to shoot entirely in May, even though the play begins in winter. This, in turn, meant the harshness of the forest described in the text was replaced by lush greenery, which was distinctly unthreatening, with the characters' "time in the forest appear[ing] to be more an upscale camping expedition rather than exile."
As You Like It	TV	(Canada)	1983	Herb Roland	Roberta Maxwell (Rosalind); Andrew Gillies (Orlando); Rosemary Dunsmore (Celia); Christopher Gibson (Jaques); Lewis Gordon (Touchstone); Graeme Campbell (Duke Frederick); William Needles (Duke Senior); Stephen Russell (Oliver); Mervyn Blake (Adam); Mary Haney (Phebe); John Jarvis (Silvius); Elizabeth Leigh-Milne (Audrey)	
As You Like It	Film	(United Kingdom)	1992	Christine Edzard	Emma Croft (Rosalind); Andrew Tiernan (Orlando/Oliver); Celia Bannerman (Celia); James Fox (Jaques); Griff Rhys Jones (Touchstone); Don Henderson (Duke Frederick/Duke Senior); Roger Hammond (Corin); Cyril Cusack (Adam); Valerie Gogan (Phebe); Ewen Bremner (Silvius); Miriam Margolyes (Audrey)	Set in a modern, urban, environment. The film received mostly negative reviews. Time Out thought that the "… wonder is that they bothered to put film in the camera, for sadly this is Shakespeare sans teeth, eyes, taste, sans everything." Derek Elley in Variety characterised it as a "British low-budgeter, mostly shot on drab exteriors, [that] will be limited to literary students and the very dedicated, given careful nursing."
"As You Like It" (Shakespeare: The Animated Tales)	TV	(Russia); - (United Kingdom)	1994	Alexei Karaev	Sylvestra Le Touzel (Rosalind); John McAndrew (Orlando); Maria Miles (Celia/Audrey); Nathaniel Parker (Jaques/Oliver); Peter Gunn (Touchstone); Christopher Benjamin (Duke Frederick/Corin); Garard Green (Duke Senior/Adam); Eiry Thomas (Phebe); David Holt (Silvius)	Animated with paint on glass using watercolors.
As You Like It	Film	(United Kingdom)	2006	Kenneth Branagh	Bryce Dallas Howard (Rosalind); David Oyelowo (Orlando); Romola Garai (Celia); Kevin Kline (Jaques); Alfred Molina (Touchstone); Brian Blessed (Duke Frederick/Duke Senior); Adrian Lester (Oliver); Jimmy Yuill (Corin); Richard Briers (Adam); Jade Jefferies (Phebe); Alex Wyndham (Silvius); Janet McTeer (Audrey)	Branagh moved the play's setting from medieval France to a late 19th century European colony in Japan after the Meiji Restoration. It is filmed at Shepperton Film Studios and at the never-before-filmed gardens of Wakehurst Place.
As You Like It	TV	(Canada)	2010	Robert Budreau; Des McAnuff	Andrea Runge (Rosalind); Paul Nolan (Orlando); Brent Carver (Jaques); Ben Carlson (Touchstone); Tom Rooney (Duke Frederick/Duke Senior)	
As You Like It	Video	(United Kingdom)	2010	Thea Sharrock	Naomi Frederick (Rosalind); Jack Laskey (Orlando); Laura Rogers (Celia); Tim McMullan (Jaques); Dominic Rowan (Touchstone); Brendan Hughes (Duke Frederick); Philip Bird (Duke Senior); Jamie Parker (Oliver); Trevor Martin (Adam); Sophie Duval (Audrey)	Recording of a performance at Shakespeare's Globe.

=== The Comedy of Errors ===
Title	M	C	Y	Directors	Starring	Description
The Boys from Syracuse	Film	(United States)	1940	A. Edward Sutherland	Allan Jones (Antipholus of Ephesus/Syracuse); Joe Penner (Dromio of Ephesus/Syracuse)	A musical film based on a stage musical by Richard Rodgers and Lorenz Hart, which in turn was based on the play. It was nominated for two Academy Awards: one for Best Visual Effects (John P. Fulton, Bernard B. Brown, Joe Lapis) and one for Best Art Direction (Jack Otterson).
Bhranti Bilas (Bengali: ভ্রান্তি বিলাস, lit. 'Illusion of illusion)'	Film	(India)	1963	Manu Sen	Uttam Kumar (Chiranjib Chowdhury and Chiranjit Chowdhury); Bhanu Bandopadhyay (Bhakti Kinkar and Shakti Kinkar); Sabitri Chatterjee (Chiranjib's Wife); Sandhya Roy (Bilashini)	The film relocates the story to modern day India. The film tells the story of a Bengali merchant from Kolkata and his servant who visit a small town for a business appointment, but, whilst there, are mistaken for a pair of locals, leading to much confusion. It is based on an 1869 play by Ishwar Chandra Vidyasagar, which is itself based on The Comedy of Errors. Bhranti Bilas was remade in 1968 as the musical comedy Do Dooni Char, which in turn was later remade as Angoor.
"The Comedy of Errors" (Festival)	TV	(United Kingdom)	1967	Peter Duguid; Clifford Williams	Alec McCowen (Antipholus of Syracuse); Ian Richardson (Antipholus of Ephesus); Barry MacGregor (Dromio of Syracuse); Clifford Rose (Dromio of Ephesus)	
Do Dooni Char	Film	(India)	1968	Debu Sen	Kishore Kumar (Sandeep); Tanuja (Anju); Asit Sen (Sevak); Rashid Khan; Sudha Rani (Pyari)	A musical comedy Bollywood adaptation based on the 1963 film Bhranti Bilas, which in turn was based on an 1869 play by Ishwar Chandra Vidyasagar, which is itself based on The Comedy of Errors. Do Dooni Char was later remade as Angoor.
The Comedy of Errors	TV	(United Kingdom)	1978	Philip Casson	Roger Rees (Antipholus of Syracuse); Mike Gwilym (Antipholus of Ephesus); Michael Williams (Dromio of Syracuse); Nickolas Grace (Dromio of Ephesus); Judi Dench (Adriana); Francesca Annis (Luciana)	A TV adaptation of a musical based on the play, with a book and lyrics by Trevor Nunn and music by Guy Woolfenden.
Angoor (Hindi: अंगूर, lit. 'Grape)'	Film	(India)	1982	Gulzar	Sanjeev Kumar (the two Ashoks); Deven Verman (the two Bahadurs)	A Bollywood adaptation, based on the 1968 film Do Dooni Char, which was based on the 1963 film Bhranti Bilas, which in turn was based on an 1869 play by Ishwar Chandra Vidyasagar, which is itself based on The Comedy of Errors.
"The Comedy of Errors" (BBC Television Shakespeare)	TV	(United Kingdom)	1983	James Cellan Jones	Michael Kitchen (Antipholus of Syracuse/Ephesus); Roger Daltrey (Dromio of Syracuse/Ephesus)	
The Comedy of Errors	TV	(United States)	1987	Robert Woodruff	Paul David Magid (Antipholus of Syracuse); Howard Jay Patterson (Antipholus of Ephesus); Samuel Ross Williams (Dromio of Syracuse); Randy Nelson (Dromio of Ephesus); Karla Burns (Duke of Ephesus/Luce); Sophie Hayden (Adriana); Gina Leishman (Luciana); Ethyl Eichelberger (Courtesan/Emilia); Timothy Daniel Furst (William Shakespeare)	Videotaped as part of PBS's Great Performances series at Lincoln Center, New York City, this production starring The Flying Karamazov Brothers combined Shakespeare with slapstick, acrobatics and juggling on the basis that "in Ephesus, you juggle or die!" with Shakespeare himself taking part in the action.
The Comedy of Errors	TV	(Canada)	1989	Richard Monette	Geordie Johnson (Antipholus of Syracuse/Ephesus); Keith Dinicol (Dromio of Syracuse/Ephesus); Nicholos Pennell (Egeon); James Blendick (The Duke of Ephesus); Goldie Semple (Adriana); Kate Hennig (Luciana); Douglas Chamberlain (Angelo); Wenna Shaw (Emilia)	

=== Love's Labour's Lost ===
Title	M	C	Y	Directors	Starring	Description
Love's Labor Lost	Animation	(United States)	1920	Vernon Stallings		
"Love's Labour's Lost" (Play of the Month)	TV	(United Kingdom)	1975	Basil Coleman	Martin Shaw (Ferdinand); Lorna Heilbron (Princess of France)	
"Love's Labour's Lost" (BBC Television Shakespeare)	TV	(United Kingdom)	1985	Elijah Moshinsky	Jonathan Kent (Ferdinand); Maureen Lipman (Princess of France)	
Love's Labour's Lost	Film	(United Kingdom)	2000	Kenneth Branagh	Alessandro Nivola (Ferdinand); Alicia Silverstone (Princess of France)	Branagh's film turns Love's Labour's Lost into a romantic Hollywood musical. Set and costume design evoke the Europe of 1939; the music (classic Broadway songs of the 1930s) and newsreel-style footage are also chief period details.

=== Measure for Measure ===
Title	M	C	Y	Directors	Starring	Description
Measure for Measure (Italian: Dente per dente, lit. 'A tooth for a tooth')	Film	(Italy)	1943	Marco Elter	Carlo Tamberlani (Angelo); Caterina Boratto (Isabella); Nelly Corradi (Marianna); Loredana (Giulietta); Memo Benassi (Lucio); Osvaldo Genazzani (Claudio); Alfredo Varelli (Vincenzo)	
"Measure For Measure" (BBC Television Shakespeare)	TV	(United Kingdom)	1979	Desmond Davis	Kenneth Colley (Duke Vincentio); Kate Nelligan (Isabella); Tim Pigott-Smith (Angelo); John McEnery (Lucio); Jacqueline Pearce (Mariana); Frank Middlemass (Pompey); Alun Armstrong (Provost); Adrienne Corri (Mistress Overdone)	
Measure for Measure	TV	(United Kingdom)	1994	David Thacker	Tom Wilkinson (Duke Vincentio); Juliet Aubrey (Isabella); Corin Redgrave (Angelo)	Modern dress version of Shakespeare's "problem comedy" emphasizing the darker elements of the play and eliminating most of the humor.
Measure for Measure	Film	(United Kingdom)	2006	Bob Komar	Simon Phillips (Duke Vincentio); Josephine Rogers (Isabella); Daniel Roberts (Angelo); Simon Nuckley (Claudio); Dawn Murphy (Escalus); Luke Leeves (Lucio)	Contemporary re-working of Shakespeare's problem play set in the British army.
M4M: Measure for Measure	Film	(United States)	2015	Gabriel Manwaring	Jim Kennedy (Duke); Jamison Challeen (Angelo); Vinnie Duyck (Escalus); Noah Mickens (Lucio)	All-male cast version
Measure For Measure	Film	(Australia)	2019	Paul Ireland	Hugo Weaving (Duke); Harrison Gilbertson (Claudio); Megan Smart (Jaiwara); Mark Leonard Winter (Angelo)	Adaptation set in modern-day Australia

=== The Merchant of Venice ===
Title	M	C	Y	Directors	Starring	Description
The Merchant of Venice	Silent	(United States)	1914	Phillips Smalley; Lois Weber	Phillips Smalley (Shylock); Lois Weber (Portia); Douglas Gerrard (Bassanio); Rupert Julian (Antonio); Jeanie Macpherson (Nerissa); Edna Maison (Jessica)	An early film of the play, now assumed to be lost.
The Merchant of Venice	Silent	(United Kingdom)	1916	Walter West	Matheson Lang (Shylock); Hutin Britton (Portia); George Skillan (Antonio); Joseph Tozer (Bassanio)	The film was made by Broadwest. The company hired the complete stage cast of the play and filmed at Walthamstow Studios using largely natural light. The film marked the screen debut of Matheson Lang who went on to become one of the leading British actors of the 1920s.
The Merchant of Venice	Film	(United Kingdom)	1922	Challis Sanderson	Ivan Berlyn (Shylock); Sybil Thorndike (Portia)	
Der Kaufmann von Venedig	Silent	(Weimar Republic)	1923	Peter Paul Felner	Werner Krauß (Shylock) Henny Porten (Portia) Harry Liedtke (Bassanio) Carl Ebert (Antonio) Max Schreck (Doge von Venedig)	A relatively late silent movie, making significant changes in the plot, nevertheless considered as a masterwork, mostly due to its stunning cast.
The Merchant of Venice	TV	(United Kingdom)	1947	George More O'Ferrall	Abraham Sofaer (Shylock); Margaretta Scott (Portia)	
"The Merchant of Venice" (Sunday Night Theatre)	TV	(United Kingdom)	1955	Hal Burton	Michael Hordern (Shylock); Rachel Gurney (Portia)	
"The Merchant of Venice" (Play of the Month)	TV	(United Kingdom)	1972	Cedric Messina	Frank Finlay (Shylock); Maggie Smith (Portia)	
The Merchant of Venice	TV	(United Kingdom)	1973	John Sichel	Laurence Olivier (Shylock); Joan Plowright (Portia); Jeremy Brett (Bassanio)	An adaptation from Jonathan Miller's acclaimed 1970 Royal National Theatre staging.
The Merchant of Venice	TV	(Canada)	1976	John Sichel	Antony Holland (Shylock); Trish Grange (Portia)	
"The Merchant of Venice" (BBC Television Shakespeare)	TV	(United Kingdom)	1980	Jack Gold	Warren Mitchell (Shylock); Gemma Jones (Portia)	
The Merchant of Venice	TV	(United Kingdom)	1996	Alan Horrox	Bob Peck (Shylock); Haydn Gwynne (Portia)	
The Merchant of Venice	TV	(United Kingdom)	2001	Chris Hunt; Trevor Nunn	Henry Goodman (Shylock); Derbhle Crotty (Portia)	
The Maori Merchant of Venice (Māori: Te Tangata Whai Rawa o Weniti)	Film	(New Zealand)	2002	Don Selwyn	Waihoroi Shortland (Hairoka); Ngarimu Daniels (Pohia)	The play was translated into Māori in 1945 by Pei Te Hurinui Jones, and his translation is used for the film. It is the first Māori-language film adaptation of any of Shakespeare's plays, and the first feature length Māori film. The film was shot in Auckland, but "recreates 16th century Venice, with costumes and surroundings to fit the original setting".
The Merchant of Venice	Film	(United States)	2004	Michael Radford	Al Pacino (Shylock); Jeremy Irons (Antonio); Joseph Fiennes (Bassanio); Lynn Collins (Portia)	

=== The Merry Wives of Windsor ===
Title	M	C	Y	Directors	Starring	Description
The Merry Wives of Windsor (German: Die lustigen Weiber von Windsor)	Film	(East Germany)	1950	Georg Wildhagen	Sonja Ziemann (Mrs. Fluth); Camilla Spira (Mrs. Gretchen Reich); Paul Esser (Sir John Falstaff); Ina Halley (Anna Reich); Eckart Dux (Fenton); Alexander Engel (Innkeeper Reich); Claus Holm (Mr. Fluth)	
"The Merry Wives of Windsor" (Sunday Night Theatre)	TV	(United Kingdom)	1952	Julian Amyes	Robert Atkins (Falstaff); Betty Huntley-Wright (Mistress Ford)	
Chimes at Midnight	Film	(Switzerland); (Spain)	1966	Orson Welles	Orson Welles (Falstaff); Ralph Richardson (Narrator); John Gielgud (King Henry IV); Keith Baxter (Hal); Margaret Rutherford (Mistress Quickly)	Welles said that the core of the film's story was "the betrayal of friendship." The script contains text from five of Shakespeare's plays: primarily Henry IV, Part 1 and Henry IV, Part 2, but also Richard II and Henry V, as well as some dialogue from The Merry Wives of Windsor. Richardson's narration is taken from the works of chronicler Raphael Holinshed. Welles had previously produced a Broadway adaptation of nine Shakespeare plays called Five Kings in 1939. In 1960, he revived this project in Ireland as Chimes at Midnight, which was his final on-stage performance. Neither of these plays was successful, but Welles considered portraying Falstaff to be his life's ambition and turned the project into a film. In order to get initial financing, Welles lied to producer Emiliano Piedra about adapting Treasure Island, and keeping the film funded during production was a constant struggle. Welles shot Chimes at Midnight throughout Spain between 1964 and 1965; it premiered at the 1966 Cannes Film Festival, winning two awards.
The Merry Wives of Windsor	TV	(United States)	1980	Jack Manning	Leon Charles (Falstaff); Valerine Seelie-Snyder (Mistress Ford)	
"The Merry Wives of Windsor" (BBC Television Shakespeare)	TV	(United Kingdom)	1982	David Jones	Alan Bennett (Justice Shallow); Richard O'Callaghan (Slender); Tenniel Evans (Sir Hugh Evans); Richard Griffiths (Sir John Falstaff); Judy Davis (Mistress Ford); Elizabeth Spriggs (Mistress Quickly)	Jones originally wanted to shoot the episode in Stratford-upon-Avon but was restricted to a studio setting. Determined that the production be as realistic as possible, he had designer Dom Homfray base the set on real Tudor houses associated with Shakespeare: Falstaff's room is based on the home of Mary Arden (Shakespeare's mother) in Wilmcote, and the wives' houses are based on the house of Shakespeare's daughter Susanna, and her husband, John Hall. For the background of exterior shots, he used a miniature Tudor village built of plasticine.

=== A Midsummer Night's Dream ===
Title	M	C	Y	Directors	Starring	Description
A Midsummer Night's Dream	Silent	(United States)	1909	Charles Kent; J. Stuart Blackton	Maurice Costello (Lysander); Rose Tapley (Hermia); Julia Swayne Gordon (Helena); Florence Turner (Queen of Fairies); Gladys Hulette (Puck); Elita Proctor Otis (Hippolyta)	The first film adaptation of the play.
Wood Love (German: Ein Sommernachtstraum)	Silent	(Weimar Republic)	1925	Hans Neumann	Werner Krauss (Bottom); Valeska Gert (Puck); Alexander Granach (Waldschrat)	
A Midsummer Night's Dream	Film	(United States)	1935	Max Reinhardt; William Dieterle	Anita Louise (Titania); Victor Jory (Oberon); James Cagney (Bottom); Mickey Rooney (Puck); Dick Powell (Lysander); Joe E. Brown (Flute); Ian Hunter (Theseus)	Austrian-born director Max Reinhardt did not speak English at the time of production. He gave orders to the actors and crew in German with William Dieterle acting as his interpreter. The film was banned in Nazi Germany because of the Jewish backgrounds of Reinhardt and composer Felix Mendelssohn. Filming had to be rearranged after Rooney broke his leg while skiing. According to Rooney's memoirs, Jack L. Warner was furious and threatened to kill him and then break his other leg. This was the film debut of Olivia de Havilland.
A Midsummer Night's Dream (Czech: Sen noci svatojánské)	Film	(Czechoslovakia)	1959	Jiří Trnka		An animated puppet film directed by Jiří Trnka. It was an Official Selection as a Feature Film at the 1959 Cannes Film Festival, and won special distinction. An English-language dubbed version was made with narration by Richard Burton.
A Midsummer Night's Dream	Film	(United Kingdom)	1968	Peter Hall	Judi Dench (Titania); Ian Richardson (Oberon); Paul Rogers (Bottom); Ian Holm (Puck); Diana Rigg (Helena); Helen Mirren (Hermia); David Warner (Lysander); Michael Jayston (Demetrius)	The film premiered in theatres in Europe in September 1968. In the U.S., it was sold directly to television rather than playing in theatres, and premiered as a Sunday evening special, on the night of 9 February 1969. It was shown on CBS (with commercials).
A Midsummer Night's Dream (French: Le Songe d'une nuit d'été)	TV	(France)	1969	Jean-Christophe Averty	Claude Jade (Helena); Christine Delaroche (Hermia); Jean-Claude Drouot (Oberon); Christiane Minazzoli (Titania)	
"A Midsummer Night's Dream" (BBC Television Shakespeare)	TV	(United Kingdom)	1980	Elijah Moshinsky	Pippa Guard (Hermia); Nicky Henson (Demetrius); Robert Lindsay (Lysander); Cherith Mellor (Helena); Helen Mirren (Titania); Peter McEnery (Oberon)	Released in the US as part of the Complete Dramatic Works of William Shakespeare series.
Dream of a Summer Night (Italian: Sogno di una Notte d'Estate)	Film	(Italy)	1983	Gabriele Salvatores	Alberto Lionello (Theseus); Erika Blanc (Hippolyta); Luca Barbareschi (Lysander)	Based on a rock musical directed by Salvatores, it is a musical adaptation. It was screened in the "De Sica" section at the 40th edition of the Venice International Film Festival.
"A Midsummer Night's Dream" (Shakespeare: The Animated Tales)	TV	(Russia); (United Kingdom)	1992	Robert Saakiants	Daniel Massey (Oberon); Suzanne Bertish (Titania)	
A Midsummer Night's Dream	Film	(United Kingdom)	1996	Adrian Noble	Alex Jennings (Theseus / Oberon); Lindsay Duncan (Hippolyta / Titania); Finbar Lynch (Philostrate / Puck)	Filmed adaptation of the Royal Shakespeare Company's 1996 version of A Midsummer Night's Dream
A Midsummer Night's Dream	Film	(United States); (Germany); (Italy)	1999	Michael Hoffman	Michelle Pfeiffer (Titania); Rupert Everett (Oberon); Kevin Kline (Bottom); Stanley Tucci (Puck); Calista Flockhart (Helena); Christian Bale (Demetrius); Sophie Marceau (Hippolyta); Roger Rees (Peter Quince)	A Midsummer Night's Dream was filmed on location in Lazio and Tuscany, and at Cinecittà Studios, Rome, Italy. The action of the play was transported from Athens, Greece, to a fictional Monte Athena, located in the Tuscan region of Italy, although all textual mentions of Athens were retained. The film made use of Felix Mendelssohn's incidental music for an 1843 stage production (including the famous Wedding March), alongside operatic works from Giuseppe Verdi, Gaetano Donizetti, Vincenzo Bellini, Gioacchino Rossini and Pietro Mascagni.
The Children's Midsummer Night's Dream	Film	(United Kingdom)	2001	Christine Edzard	Derek Jacobi (voice of Theseus); Samantha Bond (voice of Hippolyta); Dominic Haywood-Benge (Oberon); Rajouana Zalal (Titania); Leane Lyson (Puck); Danny Bishop (Lysander); Jamie Peachey (Hermia); Jessica Fowler (Helena); John Heyfron (Demetrius); Oliver Szczypka (Bottom); Daniel Rouse (Peter Quince)	In this version, a group of school children are attending a puppet performance of A Midsummer Night's Dream when they are drawn into the story and become the characters, dressed in Elizabethan costumes.
Get Over It	Film	(United States)	2001	Tommy O'Haver	Kirsten Dunst (Kelly Woods); Ben Foster (Berke Landers); Melissa Sagemiller (Allison McAllister); Sisqó (Dennis Wallace); Shane West (Bentley 'Striker' Scrumfeld); Colin Hanks (Felix Woods)	A contemporary adaptation set at a high school which includes another version of the play performed as a show-within-a-show, much like the Pyramus and Thisbe subplay in the original Shakespeare.
A Midsummer Night's Rave	Film	(United States)	2002	Gil Cates Jr.	Corey Pearson (Damon); Lauren German (Elena); Andrew Keegan (Xander); Chad Lindberg (Nick); Sunny Mabrey (Mia); Jason Carter (OB John); Nichole Hiltz (Britt); Glen Badyna (Puck); Olivia Rosewood (Tami); Chris Owen (Frankie); Will McCormack (Greg); Greg Zola (Snout); Keri Lynn Pratt (Debbie)	A modern adaptation set at a warehouse party.
Midsummer Dream (Spanish: El Sueño de una Noche de San Juan)	Film	(Spain); (Portugal)	2005	Ángel de la Cruz; Manolo Gómez	Romola Garai (Helena); Bernard Hill (Theseus); Billy Boyd (Puck); Rhys Ifans (Lysander); Miranda Richardson (Titania)	An animated adaptation.
"A Midsummer Night's Dream" (ShakespeaRe-Told)	TV	(United Kingdom)	2005	Peter Bowker	Sharon Small (Titania); Lennie James (Oberon); Johnny Vegas (Bottom)	A modern adaptation produced as part of the BBC's ShakespeaRe-told series.
Were the World Mine	Film	(United States)	2008	Tom Gustafson	Tanner Cohen (Timothy); Wendy Robie (Ms. Tebbit); Judy McLane (Donna); Zelda Williams (Frankie); Jill Larson (Nora Bellinger); Ricky Goldman (Max); Nathaniel David Becker (Jonathon); Christian Stolte (Coach Driskill); David Darlow (Dr. Lawrence Bellinger); Parker Croft (Cooper)	The film, inspired by the play, prominently features a modern, LGBT interpretation of the play put on in a private high school in a small town. Additionally, this musical's lyrics are largely based on Shakespeare's original text. For example, the title comes from a line in a song, drawn from a line in a play, "Were the world mine, Demetrius being bated / The rest I'd give to be to you translated."
10ml LOVE	Film	(India)	2010	Sharat Katariya	Neil Bhoopalam (Peter Perreira); Anusha Bose (Sabrina); Manu Rishi Chadha (Chand); Tisca Chopra (Roshni); Sarita Joshi (Galib's mother); Rajat Kapoor (Ghalib); Purab Kohli (Neel Bhatia); Koel Purie (Minnie Mehta); Tara Sharma (Shweta Rai)	A Hindi romantic comedy concerning the tribulations of a love quadrangle during a night of magic and madness and a contemporary adaptation of A Midsummer Night's Dream.
A Midsummer Night's Dream	Film	(United States)	2015	Julie Taymor	Kathryn Hunter (Puck); Dorian Harewood (Oberon); Tina Benko (Titania); Max Casella (Nick Bottom); Zach Appelman (Demetrius); Roger Clark (Duke Theseus); Lilly Englert (Hermia); Joe Grifasi (Peter Quince); Jake Horowitz (Lysander); Zachary Infante (Francis Flute); Mandi Masden (Helena); Okwui Okpokwasili (Queen Hippolyta)	Recording of a production at Polonsky Shakespeare Center, Brooklyn, New York.
Strange Magic	Film	(United States)	2015	Gary Rydstrom	Alan Cumming (Bog King); Evan Rachel Wood (Marianne); Kristin Chenoweth (Sugar Plum Fairy); Maya Rudolph (Griselda); Alfred Molina (Fairy King); Elijah Kelley (Sunny)	An animated musical fantasy romantic comedy film with feature animation by Lucasfilm Animation and Industrial Light & Magic.
A Midsummer Night's Dream	TV	(United Kingdom)	2016	David Kerr	Maxine Peake (Titania); Matt Lucas (Bottom); John Hannah (Theseus); Nonso Anozie (Oberon)	
A Midsummer Night's Dream	Film	(United States)	2018	Casey Wilder Mott	Lily Rabe (Helena); Rachael Leigh Cook (Hermia); Hamish Linklater (Lysander); Finn Wittrock (Demetrius); Avan Jogia (Puck); Fran Kranz (Bottom); Saul Williams (Oberon); Ted Levine (Theseus); Paz de la Huerta (Hippolyta); Mia Doi Todd (Titania)	A modern-day version set against the backdrop of Hollywood, CA.

=== Much Ado About Nothing ===
Title	M	C	Y	Directors	Starring	Description
Much Ado About Nothing	TV	(United States)	1973	Nick Havinga; A.J. Antoon	Sam Waterston (Benedick); Kathleen Widdoes (Beatrice); Barnard Hughes (Dogberry); Douglass Watson (Don Pedro)	A CBS television presentation of Joseph Papp's New York Shakespeare Festival production.
Much Ado About Nothing (Russian: Много шума из ничего)	Film	(Soviet Union)	1973	Samson Samsonov	Konstantin Raikin (Benedicto); Galina Jovovich (Beatrice); Tatyana Vedeneyeva (Gero); Vladimir Korenev (Juan); Erast Garin (Kissel); Pavel Pavlenko (Dogberry)	Soviet romantic comedy
"Much Ado About Nothing" (BBC Television Shakespeare)	TV	(United Kingdom)	1984	Stuart Burge	Lee Montague (Leonato); Tim Faulkner (Messenger); Cherie Lunghi (Beatrice); Katharine Levy (Hero); Jon Finch (Don Pedro); Robert Lindsay (Benedick); Robert Reynolds (Claudio); Gordon Whiting (Antonio); Vernon Dobtcheff (Don John)	Released in the US as part of the Complete Dramatic Works of William Shakespeare series.
Much Ado About Nothing	Film	(United Kingdom)	1993	Kenneth Branagh	Kenneth Branagh (Benedick); Emma Thompson (Beatrice); Denzel Washington (Don Pedro); Robert Sean Leonard (Claudio); Kate Beckinsale (Hero); Michael Keaton (Dogberry); Keanu Reeves (Don John)	
"Much Ado About Nothing" (ShakespeaRe-Told)	TV	(United Kingdom)	2005	Brian Percival	Sarah Parish (Beatrice); Damian Lewis (Benedick); Billie Piper (Hero); Martin Jarvis (Leonard)	A modern adaptation by David Nicholls.
Much Ado About Nothing	Film	(United States)	2012	Joss Whedon	Amy Acker (Beatrice); Alexis Denisof (Benedick); Fran Kranz (Claudio); Jillian Morgese (Hero); Nathan Fillion (Dogberry); Clark Gregg (Leonato)	
Anyone but You	Film	(United States)	2023	Will Gluck	Glen Powell (Ben); Sydney Sweeney (Bea); GaTa (Pete); Alexandra Shipp (Claudia)	A modern adaptation by Will Gluck and Ilana Wolpert.

=== The Taming of the Shrew ===
Title	M	C	Y	Directors	Starring	Description
The Taming of the Shrew	Silent	(United States)	1908	D. W. Griffith	Florence Lawrence (Katharina); Arthur V. Johnson (Petruchio); Linda Arvidson (Bianca); Harry Solter (Katharina's Father)	
Daring Youth	Silent	(United States)	1924	William Beaudine	Bebe Daniels (Alita Allen); Norman Kerry (John J. Campbell); Lee Moran (Arthur James); Arthur Hoyt (Winston Howell); Lillian Langdon (Mrs. Allen); George C. Pearce (Mr. Allen)	
The Taming of the Shrew	Film	(United States)	1929	Sam Taylor	Mary Pickford (Katherine); Douglas Fairbanks (Petruchio)	The first sound film adaptation of The Taming of the Shrew.
You Made Me Love You	Film	(United Kingdom)	1933	Monty Banks	Stanley Lupino (Tom Daly); Thelma Todd (Pamela Berne); John Loder (Harry Berne); Gerald Rawlinson (Jerry); James Carew (Oliver Berne)	
Kiss Me, Kate	Film	(United States)	1953	George Sidney	Howard Keel (Petruchio); Kathryn Grayson (Katerina); Ann Miller (Bianca)	An adaptation of the Broadway musical of the same name, it tells the tale of musical theater actors, Fred Graham and Lilli Vanessi, who were once married and are now performing opposite each other in the roles of Petruchio and Katherine in a Broadway-bound musical version of the play. Already on poor terms, the pair begin an all-out emotional war mid-performance that threatens the production's success.
The Taming of the Shrew	TV	(Australia)	1962	Alan Burke	Ron Haddrick (Petruchio); Brigid Lenihan (Katherina)	The play was performed live but included some filmed sequences shot in Centennial Park.
Arivaali (Tamil: அறிவாளி)	Film	(India)	1963	A. T. Krishnaswami	Sivaji Ganesan (Aalavanthan); P. Bhanumathi (Manorama); T. S. Balaiah (Nallamuthu Naicker); K. A. Thangavelu (Muthuvel); K. Sarangapani (Thandapani Pillai); T. R. Ramachandran (Tom Kumar)	
The Taming of the Shrew (Italian: La Bisbetica domata)	Film	(Italy); (United States)	1967	Franco Zeffirelli	Elizabeth Taylor (Katharina); Richard Burton (Petruchio); Michael York (Lucentio); Michael Hordern (Baptista Minola); Natasha Pyne (Bianca); Alan Webb (Gremio); Victor Spinetti (Hortensio)	"A bawdy and boisterous production which reduces the play to the Katharina/Petruccio romance."
The Taming of the Shrew	TV	(Australia)	1973	Robin Lovejoy	John Bell (Petruchio); Carol MacReady (Katherina); Kirrily Nolan (Bianca); Melissa Jaffer (Widow); Robyn Nevin (Barmaid); Shane Porteous (Tranio); Martin Vaughan (Christopher Sly)	
The Taming of the Shrew	TV	(United States)	1973	Kirk Browning	Marc Singer (Petruchio); Fredi Olster (Katherina); Sandra Shotwell (Bianca); Ron Boussom (Grumio); Rick Hamilton (Tranio); William Paterson (Baptista); Stephen Schnetzer (Lucentio); James Winkler (Hortensio); Raye Birk (Gremio)	Videotaped broadcast of the San Francisco American Conservatory Theater presenting Shakespeare's classic take with a Commedia dell'arte flair, as if it were an inn yard performance by a traveling company.
The Taming of the Scoundrel (Italian: Il Bisbetico Domato)	Film	(Italy)	1980	Franco Castellano; Giuseppe Moccia	Adriano Celentano (Elia Codogno); Ornella Muti (Lisa Silvestri); Edith Peters (Mamie); Pippo Santonastaso (Don Cirillo); Milly Carlucci (Renata); Marco Columbro (chauffeur); Sandro Ghiani (gas station attendant)	
"The Taming of the Shrew" (BBC Television Shakespeare)	TV	(United Kingdom)	1980	Jonathan Miller	John Cleese (Petruchio); Sarah Badel (Katherine); Susan Penhaligon (Bianca); John Franklyn-Robbins (Baptista); Jonathan Cecil (Hortensio); Simon Chandler (Lucentio); Anthony Pedley (Tranio); Frank Thornton (Gremio)	Released in the US as part of the Complete Dramatic Works of William Shakespeare series.
Kiss Me, Petruchio	TV	(United States)	1981	Christopher Dixon	Raúl Julia (Petruchio); Meryl Streep (Katherina); Joel Brooks (Grumio); Max Gulak (Baptista); Deborah Rush (Bianca); Larry Pine (Hortensio); Joseph Papp (himself)	Documentary following actress Streep and actor Julia as they prepare to perform and actually perform Shakespeare's comedy The Taming of the Shrew for the "Shakespeare in the Park" theater festival in Central Park, New York.
The Taming of the Shrew (The Shakespeare Collection)	Video	(United States)	1983	John Allinson	Karen Austin (Katherine); Franklyn Seales (Petruchio); Larry Drake (Baptista); Bruce Davison (Tranio)	
"Atomic Shakespeare" (Moonlighting)	TV	(United States)	1986	Will Mackenzie	Cybill Shepherd (Katerina); Bruce Willis (Petruchio)	First aired on 25 November 1986, the episode presented the play through multiple fourth-wall layers with a self-referential frame tale, in which a young fan of the TV show has a Shakespeare reading assignment and imagines it as presented by the show's regular cast.
Nanjundi Kalyana (Kannada: ನಂಜುಂಡಿ ಕಲ್ಯಾಣ, lit. 'Nanjundi's marriage)'	Film	(India)	1989	M. S. Rajashekar	Raghavendra Rajkumar (Raghuchandra); Malashri (Devi)	An adaptation based on Parvathavani's Kannada drama which was a translation of the play. The film was among the biggest grossing Kannada films of 1989, and was remade in Telugu as Mahajananiki Maradalu Pilla (1990).
Mahajananiki Maradalu Pilla (Telugu: మహాజనానికి మరదలు పిల్ల, lit. 'A child of neglect)'	Film	(India)	1990	Vallabhaneni Janardhan; Vijaya Bapineedu	Rajendra Prasad (Ravi / Kishtaiah); Nirosha (Devi); Satyanarayana (Dr.Rama Murthy); Rallapalli (Nakkapalli Narayana Swamy); Brahmanandam (Dr. Vyayam Vyagreswara Rao)	A remake of the Kannada film Nanjundi Kalyana (1989).
"The Taming of the Shrew" (Shakespeare: The Animated Tales)	TV	(Russia); (United Kingdom)	1994	Aida Ziablikova	Amanda Root (Katherine); Nigel Le Vaillant (Petruchio)	
10 Things I Hate About You	Film	(United States)	1999	Gil Junger	Julia Stiles (Kat Stratford); Heath Ledger (Patrick Verona); Joseph Gordon-Levitt (Cameron James); Larisa Oleynik (Bianca Stratford)	A modernization of the play, retold in a late-1990s American high school setting. New student Cameron is smitten with Bianca and, in order to get around her father's strict rules on dating, attempts to get bad boy Patrick to date Bianca's ill-tempered sister, Kat.
The Carnation and the Rose (Portuguese: O Cravo e a Rosa)	Telenovela	(Brazil)	2000–1		Adriana Esteves (Catarina Batista); Eduardo Moscovis (Julião Petruchio); Drica Moraes (Marcela Almeida / Muriel); Leandra Leal (Bianca Batista); Ângelo Antônio (Edmundo das Neves)	
Deliver Us from Eva	Film	(United States)	2003	Gary Hardwick	James Todd Smith (Petruchio); Gabrielle Union (Katerina)	
"The Taming of The Shrew" (ShakespeaRe-Told)	TV	(United Kingdom)	2005	David Richards	Shirley Henderson (Katherine); Rufus Sewell (Petruchio)	A modern adaptation by Sally Wainwright.
Frivolous Wife (Korean: 날나리 종부전)	Film	(South Korea)	2008	Lim Won-kook	Park Jung-ah (Cheon Yeon-soo); Park Jin-woo (Lee Jeong-do); Lee Won-jong (Yeon-soo's father); Yang Geum-seok (Aunt-in-law); Lee Il-hwa (Aunt-in-law)	

=== Twelfth Night ===
Title	M	C	Y	Directors	Starring	Description
Twelfth Night	Film	(United States)	1910	Eugene Mullin; Charles Kent	Julia Swayne Gordon (Olivia); Charles Kent (Malvolio); Florence Turner (Viola); William Humphrey (Sir Toby Belch)	
Twelfth Night	Film	(United States)	1933	Orson Welles	Hascy Tarbox (Sir Andrew Aguecheek); Joanne Hill (Viola)	Notable as the earliest surviving film directed by Welles, then aged 17. It is a recording of the dress rehearsal of Welles's own abridged production at his alma mater, the Todd School for Boys, where he had returned to direct this adaptation for the Chicago Drama Festival in 1933.
Twelfth Night (Russian: Двенадцатая ночь)	Film	(Soviet Union)	1955	Yan Frid	Klara Luchko (Viola/Sebastian); Alla Larionova (Olivia); Vadim Medvedev (Duke Orsino); Mikhail Yanshin (Sir Toby Belch); Georgi Vitsin (Sir Andrew Aguecheek); Vasili Merkuryev (Malvolio); Bruno Freindlich (Feste)	
Twelfth Night	TV	(Australia)	1966	Ken Hannam	Judith Fisher (Viola); Mark McManus (Sebastian); Helen Morse (Olivia); Roger Climpson (Orsino)	
Twelfth Night	TV	(United Kingdom)	1970	John Sichel; John Dexter	Joan Plowright (Viola and Sebastian); Alec Guinness (Malvolio); Ralph Richardson (Sir Toby Belch); Tommy Steele (Feste)	
"Twelfth Night" (BBC Television Shakespeare)	TV	(United Kingdom)	1980	John Gorrie	Alec McCowen (Malvolio); Robert Hardy (Sir Toby Belch); Felicity Kendal (Viola); Annette Crosbie (Maria); Sinéad Cusack (Olivia); Trevor Peacock (Feste); Clive Arrindell (Orsino); Ronnie Stevens (Sir Andrew Aguecheek)	Released in the US as part of the Complete Dramatic Works of William Shakespeare series.
Twelfth Night	Film	(Australia)	1986	Neil Armfield	Gillian Jones (Viola/Sebastian); Geoffrey Rush (Sir Andrew Aguecheek); Ivar Kants (Orsino); John Wood (Sir Toby Belch)	
Twelfth Night	TV	(United Kingdom)	1988	Kenneth Branagh	Richard Briers (Malvolio); Caroline Langrishe (Olivia)	Music by Patrick Doyle and Paul McCartney
"Twelfth Night" (Shakespeare: The Animated Tales)	TV	(Russia); (United Kingdom)	1992	Maria Muat	Rosemary Leach (Narrator); Fiona Shaw (Viola); Roger Allam (Duke Orsino); Suzanne Burden (Olivia); Gerald James (Malvolio); William Rushton (Toby Belch); Stephen Tompkinson (Sir Andrew); Alice Arnold (Maria); Stefan Bednarczyk (Feste); Hugh Grant (Sebastian)	
Twelfth Night	Film	(United Kingdom)	1996	Trevor Nunn	Ben Kingsley (Feste); Imogen Stubbs (Viola); Helena Bonham Carter (Olivia); Toby Stephens (Orsino); Nigel Hawthorne (Malvolio); Mel Smith (Sir Toby Belch); Imelda Staunton (Maria); Richard E. Grant (Sir Andrew Aguecheek)	
Twelfth Night, or What You Will	TV	(United Kingdom)	2003	Tim Supple	Parminder Nagra (Viola); Ronny Jhutti (Sebastian); Chiwetel Ejiofor (Orsino); Claire Price (Olivia); David Troughton (Sir Toby Belch)	
She's the Man	Film	(United States)	2006	Andy Fickman	Amanda Bynes (Viola); Channing Tatum (Duke Orsino); Laura Ramsey (Olivia); James Kirk (Sebastian)	Adapts the story to a high-school setting.
Twelfth Night	Film	(United Kingdom)	2013	Tim Carroll	Peter Hamilton Dyer (Feste); Samuel Barnett (Viola); Mark Rylance (Olivia); Liam Brennan (Orsino); Stephen Fry (Malvolio); Colin Hurley (Sir Toby Belch); Paul Chahidi (Maria); Roger Lloyd Pack (Sir Andrew Aguecheek)	"Globe on Screen": All-male cast in an "original practice" production.

=== The Two Gentlemen of Verona ===
Title	M	C	Y	Directors	Starring	Description
A Spray of Plum Blossoms (Chinese: 一剪梅; pinyin: Yī jiǎn méi)	Silent film	(Republic of China (1912–1949))	1931	Bu Wancang	Ruan Lingyu (Julia); Jin Yan (Valentine); Wang Cilong (Proteus); Lim Cho Cho (Sylvia); Gao Zhanfei (Tiburio); Chen Yen-yen (Lucetta)	The film is noted for its attempted "Westernized stylings" including its surreal use of decor, women-soldiers with long hair, etc. The film also had English-subtitles, but as some scholars have noted, since few foreigners watched these films, the subtitles were more to give off an air of the West rather than to serve any real purpose.
"The Two Gentlemen of Verona" (BBC Television Shakespeare)	TV	(United Kingdom)	1983	Don Taylor	Frank Barrie (Sir Eglamour); Tessa Peake-Jones (Julia); Hetta Charnley (Lucetta); Tyler Butterworth (Proteus); John Hudson (Valentine)	Released in the US as part of the Complete Dramatic Works of William Shakespeare series.

== Tragedies ==
=== Antony and Cleopatra ===
Title	M	C	Y	Directors	Starring	Description
Antony and Cleopatra	Film	(United States)	1908	J. Stuart Blackton; Charles Kent	Florence Lawrence (Cleopatra); William V. Ranous (Octavius Caesar); Betty Kent (Cleopatra); William Phillips (Octavius Caesar); Charles Chapman (Mark Antony)	
Antony and Cleopatra (Italian: Marcantonio e Cleopatra)	Silent film	(Italy)	1913	Enrico Guazzoni	Gianna Terribili-Gonzales (Cleopatra); Amleto Novelli (Marcantonio); Ignazio Lupi (Augustus Caesar Ottaviano); Matilde Di Marzio (La schiava Agar aka Charmian); Ida Carloni Talli (La strega)	
Antony and Cleopatra	TV	(Australia)	1959	Christopher Muir	Bettie Kauffman (Cleopatra); Keith Eden (Antony); Kevin Miles (Caesar)	
Antony and Cleopatra	Film	(United Kingdom); (Spain); (Switzerland)	1972	Charlton Heston	Charlton Heston (Antony); Hildegarde Neil (Cleopatra); Eric Porter (Enobarbus)	
Antony and Cleopatra	TV	(United Kingdom)	1974	Jon Scoffield	Janet Suzman (Cleopatra); Richard Johnson (Antony); Patrick Stewart (Enobarbus)	An adaptation of Trevor Nunn's Royal Shakespeare Company production.
"Antony & Cleopatra" (BBC Television Shakespeare)	TV	(United Kingdom)	1981	Jonathan Miller	John Paul (Canidius); Jonathan Adams (Ventidius); Jane Lapotaire (Cleopatra); Colin Blakely (Antony); Darien Angadi (Alexas)	Released in the US as part of the Complete Dramatic Works of William Shakespeare series.
Kannaki	Film	(India)	2002	Jayaraaj	Lal (Manikyan); Siddique (Choman)	

=== Coriolanus ===
Title	M	C	Y	Directors	Starring	Description
"The Tragedy of Coriolanus" (BBC Television Shakespeare)	TV	(United Kingdom)	1984	Elijah Moshinsky	Alan Howard (Caius Marcius); Joss Ackland (Menenius); Patrick Godfrey (Cominius); Peter Sands (Titus Lartius); Irene Worth (Volumnia); Joanna McCallum (Virgilia)	Released in the US as part of the Complete Dramatic Works of William Shakespeare series.
Coriolanus	Film	(United Kingdom)	2011	Ralph Fiennes	Ralph Fiennes (Coriolanus); Gerard Butler (Tullus Aufidius); Vanessa Redgrave (Volumnia); Brian Cox (Menenius)	

=== Hamlet ===
Title	M	C	Y	Directors	Starring	Description
Hamlet (French: Le Duel d'Hamlet)	Film	(France)	1900	Clément Maurice	Sarah Bernhardt (Hamlet)	Believed to have been the earliest film adaptation of the play. The film is two minutes in length. It also was one of the first films to employ the newly discovered art of pre-recording the actors' voices, then playing the recording simultaneous to the playing of the film. So, while produced during the silent film era, the film is technically not a silent film.
Hamlet	Silent	(France)	1907	Georges Méliès	Georges Méliès (Hamlet)	The first multi-scene cinematic adaptation of any work by Shakespeare.
Hamlet	Silent	(France)	1908	Henri Desfontaines	Jacques Grétillat (Hamlet); Colanna Romano (Gertrude)	One of twelve renditions of the play produced during the silent film era.
Hamlet	Silent	(United Kingdom)	1912	Charles Raymond	Charles Raymond (Hamlet); Dorothy Foster (Ophelia); Constance Backner (Gertrude)	
Hamlet	Silent	(United Kingdom)	1913	Hay Plumb	Johnston Forbes-Robertson (Hamlet); Gertrude Elliott (Ophelia); Walter Ringham (Claudius); Adeleine Bourne (Gertrude); J.H. Barnes (Polonius); J.H. Ryley (A Gravedigger); Robert Atkins (Marcellus); George Hayes (Osric)	Made by the Hepworth Company and based on the Drury Lane Theatre's 1913 staging of the work.
Hamlet (Italian: Amleto)	Silent	(Italy)	1917	Eleuterio Rodolfi	Ruggero Ruggeri (Hamlet); Helena Makowska (Ophelia); Mercedes Brignone (Gertrude)	
Hamlet	Silent	(Germany)	1921	Svend Gade; Heinz Schall	Asta Nielsen (Hamlet); Paul Conradi (King Hamlet); Mathilde Brandt (Queen Gertrude); Eduard von Winterstein (King Claudius)	
Blood for Blood (Urdu: Khoon Ka Khoon)	Film	(British Raj)	1935	Sohrab Modi	Sohrab Modi (Hamlet); Naseem Banu (Ophelia); Shamshadbai (Gertrude)	Cited as one of the earliest talkie adaptations. Credited as "the man who brought Shakespeare to the Indian screen", it was Modi's debut feature film as a director. The story and script were by Mehdi Hassan Ahsan from his Urdu adaptation of Hamlet. Khoon Ka Khoon was the debut in films of Naseem Banu. Khoon Ka Khoon was a "filmed version of a stage performance of the play". The film has been cited by National Film Archive of India founder P K. Nair, as one of "most wanted" missing Indian cinema treasures.
Hamlet	Film	(United Kingdom)	1948	Laurence Olivier	Basil Sydney (Claudius); Eileen Herlie (Gertrude); Laurence Olivier (Hamlet); Norman Wooland (Horatio); Felix Aylmer (Polonius); Terence Morgan (Laertes); Jean Simmons (Ophelia)	Olivier's second film as director, and also the second of the three Shakespeare films that he directed. Hamlet was the first British film to win the Academy Award for Best Picture. It is also the first sound film of the play in English. Olivier's Hamlet is the Shakespeare film that has received the most prestigious accolades, winning the Academy Awards for Best Picture and Best Actor and the Golden Lion at the Venice Film Festival.
I, Hamlet (Italian: Io, Amleto)	Film	(Italy)	1952	Giorgio Simonelli	Erminio Macario (Hamlet); Franca Marzi (Valchiria); Rossana Podestà (Ophelia); Adriano Rimoldi (Laertes); Luigi Pavese (King Claudius); Marisa Merlini (Queen Gertrude); Giuseppe Porelli (Polonius)	
Hamlet (Urdu: हेमलेट)	Film	(India)	1954	Kishore Sahu	Kishore Sahu (Hamlet); Mala Sinha (Ophelia)	Sahu was influenced by "classic European sources". Though termed a "free adaptation" in the credit roll of the film, Sahu stayed true to the title, its setting, and the original names in the play, remaining as close as possible to Olivier's 1948 film.
Hamlet	TV	(Australia)	1959	Royston Morley	William Job (Hamlet); Henry Gilbert (Claudius); Georgie Sterling (Gertrude); Owen Weingott (Laertes); Delia William (Ophelia)	
The Bad Sleep Well (Japanese: 悪い奴ほどよく眠る, romanized: Warui yatsu hodo yoku nemuru)	Film	(Japan)	1960	Akira Kurosawa	Toshiro Mifune (Kōichi Nishi); Masayuki Mori (Iwabuchi); Kyōko Kagawa (Yoshiko Nishi); Tatsuya Mihashi (Tatsuo Iwabuchi); Takashi Shimura (Moriyama)	
Hamlet (German: Hamlet, Prinz von Dänemark)	TV	(West Germany)	1961	Franz Peter Wirth	Maximilian Schell (Hamlet); Hans Caninenberg (Claudius); Wanda Rotha (Gertrude); Franz Schafheitlin (Polonius); Paul Verhoeven (Erster Totengräber)	
Ophelia	Film	(France)	1963	Claude Chabrol	Alida Valli (Claudia Lesurf); Claude Cerval (Adrien Lesurf); André Jocelyn (Yvan Lesurf); Juliette Mayniel (Lucie); Robert Burnier (Andre Lagrange)	
Hamlet (Russian: Гамлет, romanized: Gamlet)	Film	(Soviet Union)	1964	Grigori Kozintsev; Iosif Shapiro	Innokenty Smoktunovsky (Hamlet); Mikhail Nazvanov (Claudius); Elza Radziņa (Gertrude); Yuri Tolubeyev (Polonius); Anastasiya Vertinskaya (Ophelia)	Based on a translation by Boris Pasternak, and with a score by Dmitri Shostakovich. Both Kozintsev and the film itself gained prominence among adaptations of the play, and Smoktunovsky is considered one of the great cinematic Hamlets.
Hamlet	Film	(United States)	1964	Bill Colleran (film); John Gielgud (stage)	Richard Burton (Hamlet); Hume Cronyn (Polonius); Alfred Drake (Claudius); Eileen Herlie (Gertrude); Linda Marsh (Ophelia); John Gielgud (Ghost)	
Hamlet at Elsinore	TV	(Denmark); (United Kingdom)	1964	Philip Saville	Christopher Plummer (Hamlet); Robert Shaw (Claudius); Donald Sutherland (Fortinbras); Roy Kinnear (Gravedigger); Michael Caine (Horatio)	
Johnny Hamlet (Italian: Quella sporca storia nel West, lit. 'That Dirty Story in the West)'	Film	(Italy)	1968	Enzo G. Castellari	Chip Corman (Johnny Hamilton); Gilbert Roland (Horace); Françoise Prévost (Gertry); Horst Frank (Claude Hamilton); Stefania Careddu (Eugenia)	A Spaghetti Western version.
Hamlet	Film	(United Kingdom)	1969	Tony Richardson	Nicol Williamson (Hamlet); Anthony Hopkins (Claudius); Judy Parfitt (Gertrude); Marianne Faithfull (Ophelia); Mark Dignam (Polonius); Gordon Jackson (Horatio); Michael Pennington (Laertes)	
One Hamlet Less (Italian: Un Amleto di meno)	Film	(Italy)	1973	Carmelo Bene	Carmelo Bene (Hamlet); Luciana Cante (Gertrude); Isabella Russo (Ophelia); Giuseppe Tuminelli (Polonius); Alfiero Vincenti (Claudius)	
Hamlet	TV	(Australia)	1974	Julian Pringle	Jeff Ashby; John Bell; Max Cullen; Ken Lawrence; Roger Newcombe; John Paramor; Anna Volska	
The Angel of Vengeance – The Female Hamlet (Turkish: İntikam Meleği – Kadın Hamlet)	Film	(Turkey)	1977	Metin Erksan	Fatma Girik (Hamlet); Sevda Ferdag (Her Mother); Reha Yurdakul (Her Uncle); Ahmet Sezerel (Orhan)	
"Hamlet, Prince of Denmark" (BBC Television Shakespeare)	TV	(United Kingdom)	1980	Rodney Bennett	Derek Jacobi (Hamlet); Claire Bloom (Gertrude); Patrick Stewart (Claudius); Eric Porter (Polonius); Lalla Ward (Ophelia)	
Strange Brew	Film	(Canada)	1983	Dave Thomas; Rick Moranis	Dave Thomas (Doug McKenzie); Rick Moranis (Bob McKenzie); Max von Sydow (Brewmeister Smith); Lynne Griffin (Pam Elsinore); Angus MacInnes (Jean LeRose)	
Hamlet Goes Business (Finnish: Hamlet liikemaailmassa)	Film	(Finland)	1987	Aki Kaurismäki	Pirkka-Pekka Petelius (Hamlet); Esko Salminen (Klaus); Kati Outinen (Ofelia); Elina Salo (Gertrud); Esko Nikkari (Polonius)	
Hamlet	Film	(United States); (United Kingdom); (France)	1990	Franco Zeffirelli	Mel Gibson (Hamlet); Glenn Close (Gertrude); Alan Bates (Claudius); Paul Scofield (Ghost); Ian Holm (Polonius); Helena Bonham Carter (Ophelia)	The movie received two Academy Award nominations, for Best Art Direction and Best Costume Design (Dante Ferretti, Francesca Lo Schiavo). Bates received a BAFTA nomination as Best Supporting Actor for playing Claudius.
Rosencrantz & Guildenstern Are Dead	Film	(United Kingdom); (United States)	1990	Tom Stoppard	Tim Roth (Guildenstern); Gary Oldman (Rosencrantz); Richard Dreyfuss (The Lead Player); Iain Glen (Hamlet); Ian Richardson (Polonius); Joanna Miles (Gertrude); Donald Sumpter (Claudius)	Based on Stoppard's play of the same name, the film depicts two minor characters from Hamlet, Rosencrantz and Guildenstern, who find themselves on the road to Elsinore Castle at the behest of the King of Denmark. They encounter a band of players before arriving to find that they are needed to try to discern what troubles the prince Hamlet. Meanwhile, they ponder the meaning of their existence. The movie won the Golden Lion at the 47th Venice International Film Festival.
"Hamlet" (Shakespeare: The Animated Tales)	TV	(Russia); (United Kingdom)	1992	Natalia Orlova	Michael Kitchen (Narrator); Nicholas Farrell (Hamlet); John Shrapnel (Claudius); John Shrapnel (Ghost); Susan Fleetwood (Gertrude); Tilda Swinton (Ophelia); John Warner (Polonius)	
Renaissance Man	Film	(United States)	1994	Penny Marshall	Danny DeVito (Bill Rago); Gregory Hines (Cass); James Remar (Tom Murdoch); Cliff Robertson (James); Ed Begley, Jr. (Jack Markin)	
The Lion King	Film	(United States)	1994	Roger Allers; Rob Minkoff	Matthew Broderick (Simba); Jeremy Irons (Scar); James Earl Jones (Mufasa); Moira Kelly (Nala)	An animated epic musical drama film, produced by Walt Disney Feature Animation and released by Walt Disney Pictures. The story takes place within a pride of lions in Africa.
In the Bleak Midwinter	Film	(United Kingdom)	1995	Kenneth Branagh	Michael Maloney (Joe Harper); Richard Briers (Henry Wakefield); Joan Collins (Margaretta D'Arcy); Nicholas Farrell (Tom Newman); Mark Hadfield (Vernon Spatch)	
Hamlet	Film	(United Kingdom); (United States)	1996	Kenneth Branagh	Kenneth Branagh (Hamlet); Derek Jacobi (Claudius); Julie Christie (Gertrude); Kate Winslet (Ophelia); Michael Maloney (Laertes); Richard Briers (Polonius); Nicholas Farrell (Horatio)	The film is notable as the first unabridged theatrical film adaptation, running just over four hours. The play's setting is updated to the 19th century, but its Elizabethan English remains the same. Hamlet was also the last major dramatic motion picture to be filmed entirely on 70 mm film until the release of The Master (2012). Hamlet was highly acclaimed by the majority of critics and has been regarded as one of the best Shakespeare film adaptations ever made.
Let the Devil Wear Black	Film	(United States)	1999	Stacy Title	Jonathan Penner (Jack Lyne); Norman Reedus (Brautigan); Jacqueline Bisset (Helen Lyne); Mary-Louise Parker (Julia Hirsch); Jamey Sheridan (Carl Lyne)	A modern-day version set in Los Angeles. All of the language is modern.
Hamlet	Film	(United States)	2000	Michael Almereyda	Ethan Hawke (Hamlet); Kyle MacLachlan (Claudius); Diane Venora (Gertrude); Sam Shepard (Ghost); Liev Schreiber (Laertes); Julia Stiles (Ophelia); Bill Murray (Polonius)	In this version, Claudius becomes King and CEO of "Denmark Corporation", having taken over the firm by killing his brother, Hamlet's father. This adaptation keeps the Shakespearean dialogue but presents a modern setting, with technology such as video cameras, Polaroid cameras, and surveillance bugs. For example, the ghost of Hamlet's murdered father first appears on closed-circuit TV.
The Tragedy of Hamlet	Film	(United Kingdom)	2002	Peter Brook	Adrian Lester (Hamlet); Jeffery Kissoon (Claudius/Ghost); Natasha Parry (Gertrude); Rohan Siva (GuildensternLaertes); Shantala Shivalingappa (Ophelia); Bruce Myers (Polonius/Gravedigger; Scott Handy (Horatio)	Film of the stage production mounted at Theatre des Bouffes du Nord in Paris. Director Brook cut about one-third of the text, bringing it down to two hours and 20 minutes without an intermission and rearranging the order of some scenes.
The Banquet (Chinese: 夜宴; pinyin: Yè Yàn)	Film	(China)	2006	Feng Xiaogang	Zhang Ziyi (Empress Wan); Ge You (Emperor Li); Daniel Wu (Crown Prince Wu Luan); Zhou Xun (Qing); Huang Xiaoming (General Yin Sun)	A loose adaptation of Hamlet and Ibsen's Ghosts, set in the Five Dynasties and Ten Kingdoms period in 10th century China.
Hamlet	TV	(United Kingdom)	2009	Gregory Doran	David Tennant (Hamlet); Patrick Stewart (Claudius); Penny Downie (Gertrude); Mariah Gale (Ophelia); Oliver Ford Davies (Polonius)	An adaptation of the Royal Shakespeare Company's 2008 modern-dress stage production.
Tardid (Persian: تردید, lit. 'Doubt)'	Film	(Iran)	2009	Varuzh Karim-Masihi (Persian: واروژ کریم مسیحی)	Bahram Radan (Siavash Roozbehan); Taraneh Alidoosti (Mahtab); Alireza Shoja Noori (Siavashs uncle); Mohammad Moti (Anvari); Atash Garakani (Mah Talat)	
Hamlet	Film	(Canada)	2011	Bruce Ramsay	Bruce Ramsay (Hamlet); Lara Gilchrist (Ophelia); Peter Wingfield (Claudius); Gillian Barber Gertude); Duncan Fraser (Polonius)	A condensed retelling of the play set in 1940s England.
Karmayogi	Film	(India)	2012	V. K. Prakash	Indrajith (Rudran Gurukkal); Nithya Menon; Padmini Kolhapure (Mankamma); Saiju Kurup; Ashokan	
Haider	Film	(India)	2014	Vishal Bhardwaj	Tabu (Ghazala Meer); Shahid Kapoor (Haider Meer); Shraddha Kapoor (Arshia Lone); Narendra Jha (Dr. Hilal Meer ); Irrfan Khan (Roohdaar)	
The Lion King	Film	(United States)	2019	Jon Favreau	Donald Glover (Simba); Chiwetel Ejiofor (Scar); James Earl Jones (Mufasa); Beyoncé (Nala)	A musical drama film, produced and released by Walt Disney Pictures. It is a photorealistic animated remake of Disney's traditionally animated 1994 film of the same name. The story takes place within a pride of lions in Africa.

=== Julius Caesar ===
Title	M	C	Y	Directors	Starring	Description
Julius Caesar	Film	(United States)	1950	David Bradley	David Bradley (Brutus); Harold Tasker (Caesar); Charlton Heston (Mark Antony)	The first film version of the play with sound. It was produced using actors from the Chicago area. Heston, who had known Bradley since his youth, was the only paid cast member. Bradley recruited drama students from his alma mater Northwestern University for bit parts and extras, one of whom was future star Jeffrey Hunter, who studied alongside Heston at Northwestern. The 16 mm film was shot in 1949 on locations in the Chicago area, including Soldier Field, the Museum of Science and Industry, the Elks National Veterans Memorial, and the Field Museum. The Indiana sand dunes on Lake Michigan were used for the Battle of Philippi. One indoor set was built in the Chicago suburb of Evanston. To save money, about 80% of the film was shot silently, with the dialogue dubbed in later by the actors.
Julius Caesar	Film	(United States)	1953	Joseph L. Mankiewicz	James Mason (Brutus); John Gielgud (Cassius); Marlon Brando (Mark Antony); Louis Calhern (Julius Caesar)	Brando's casting was met with some skepticism when it was announced, as he had acquired the nickname of "The Mumbler" following his performance in A Streetcar Named Desire (1951). Mankiewicz even considered Paul Scofield for the role of Mark Antony if Brando's screen test was unsuccessful. Brando asked John Gielgud for advice in declaiming Shakespeare, and adopted all of Gielgud's recommendations. Brando's performance turned out so well that the New York Times stated in its review of the film: "Happily, Mr. Brando's diction, which has been guttural and slurred in previous films, is clear and precise in this instance. In him a major talent has emerged." Brando was so dedicated in his performance during shooting that Gielgud offered to direct him in a stage production of Hamlet, a proposition that Brando seriously considered but ultimately turned down.
Cleopatra	Film	(United States)	1963	Joseph L. Mankiewicz	Elizabeth Taylor (Cleopatra); Richard Burton (Antony); Rex Harrison (Julius Caesar); Roddy McDowell (Octavian); Kenneth Haigh (Brutus); John Hoyt (Cassius); Douglas Wilmer (Decius/Decimus); Michael Gwynn (Cimber); Carroll O'Connor (Casca); Michael Hordern (Cicero); Gwen Watford (Calpurnia)	While this film is more often remembered for its portrayal of the star-crossed lovers, Antony and Cleopatra, it's the events from Julius Caesar that drive the first half of the film. If Chimes at Midnight can be included in with the section for The Merry Wives of Windsor, then this film has more than equal claim to be included with Julius Caesar.
Julius Caesar	TV	(United Kingdom)	1969	Alan Bridges	Frank Finlay (Brutus); Robert Stephens (Mark Antony); Maurice Denham (Julius Caesar); Edward Woodward (Cassius)	filmed for BBC Television.
Julius Caesar	Film	(United Kingdom)	1970	Stuart Burge	Charlton Heston (Mark Antony); Jason Robards (Brutus); John Gielgud (Caesar); Richard Johnson (Cassius); Diana Rigg (Portia)	The first film version of the play made in colour.
"Julius Caesar" (BBC Television Shakespeare)	TV	(United Kingdom)	1979	Herbert Wise	Richard Pasco (Marcus Brutus); Charles Gray (Julius Caesar); Keith Michell (Marcus Antonius); David Collings (Cassius); Virginia McKenna (Portia)	Released in the US as part of the Complete Dramatic Works of William Shakespeare series.
"Julius Caesar" (Shakespeare: The Animated Tales)	TV	(Russia); (United Kingdom)	1994	Yuri Kulakov	Joss Ackland (Caesar); Frances Tomelty (Calphurnia); David Robb (Brutus); Hugh Quarshie (Cassius); Jim Carter (Mark Antony); Judith Sharp (Portia)	Cel animation
Julius Caesar	TV	(United Kingdom)	2012	Gregory Doran	Paterson Joseph (Brutus); Ray Fearon (Mark Antony); Jeffery Kissoon (Julius Caesar); Cyril Nri (Cassius); Adjoa Andoh (Portia)	Royal Shakespeare Company stage production, filmed for BBC Television.
Julius Caesar	TV	(United Kingdom)	2018	Angus Jackson	Alex Waldmann (Brutus); James Corrigan (Mark Antony); Andrew Woodall (Julius Caesar); Martin Hutson (Cassius); Hannah Morrish (Portia)	Royal Shakespeare Company stage production, filmed for BBC Television.
Julius Caesar	TV	(United Kingdom)	2018	Phyllida Lloyd	Harriet Walter (Brutus); Jade Anouka (Mark Antony); Jackie Clune (Julius Caesar); Martina Laird (Cassius); Clare Dunne (Portia)	Donmar Warehouse all-female stage production, filmed for Television.

=== King Lear ===
Title	M	C	Y	Directors	Starring	Description
King Lear (Italian: Re Lear)	Silent	(Italy)	1910	Gerolamo Lo Savio	Ermete Novelli (King Lear); Francesca Bertini (Cordelia); Olga Giannini Novelli (Lear's Daughter); Giannina Chiantoni (Lear's Daughter)	
King Lear	Silent	(United States)	1916	Ernest C. Warde	Frederick Warde (King Lear); Ernest C. Warde (The King's Fool); Lorraine Huling (Cordelia); Ina Hammer (Goneril); Edith Diestal (Regan); Hector Dion (Edmund); Boyd Marshall (The King of France)	
Gunasundari Katha (Telugu: గుణసుందరి కథ)	Film	(India)	1949	K. V. Reddy	Govindarajula Subba Rao (King Ugrasena); Sriranjani (Gunasundari ); Santha Kumari (Rupasundari)	
King Lear	TV	(United States)	1953	Peter Brook; Andrew McCullough	Orson Welles (King Lear); Natasha Parry (Cordelia); Margaret Phillips (Regan); Beatrice Straight (Goneril)	Originally presented live, now survives on kinescope.
King Lear	Film	(United Kingdom)	1971	Peter Brook	Paul Scofield (King Lear); Cyril Cusack (Albany); Irene Worth (Goneril); Susan Engel (Regan); Tom Fleming (Kent); Jack MacGowran (Fool); Patrick Magee (Cornwall); Anne-Lise Gabold (Cordelia); Ian Hogg (Edmund)	
King Lear (Russian: Король Лир, romanized: Korol Lir)	Film	(Soviet Union)	1971	Grigori Kozintsev	Jüri Järvet (King Lear); Elza Radzina (Goneril); Galina Volchek (Regan); Valentina Shendrikova (Cordelia)	The Russian composer Dmitri Shostakovich composed the score.
"King Lear" (Great Performances)	TV	(United States)	1974	Edwin Sherin	James Earl Jones (Lear); Raul Julia (Edmund); René Auberjonois (Edgar); Rosalind Cash (Goneril); Douglass Watson (Kent)	Recording of a New York Shakespeare Festival production.
King Lear	TV	(United Kingdom)	1974	Tony Davenall	Patrick Magee (Lear); Beth Harris (Goneril); Ann Lynn (Regan); Wendy Alnutt (Cordelia); Patrick Mower (Edmund); Robert Coleby (Edgar)	
"King Lear" (BBC Television Shakespeare)	TV	(United Kingdom)	1982	Jonathan Miller	Michael Hordern (Lear); Frank Middlemass (the Fool); Brenda Blethyn (Cordelia); Anton Lesser (Edgar)	Released in the US as part of the Complete Dramatic Works of William Shakespeare series.
King Lear	TV	(United Kingdom)	1983	Michael Elliot	Laurence Olivier (Lear); Leo McKern (Gloucester); Diana Rigg (Regan); Dorothy Tutin (Goneril); Robert Lang (Albany); Robert Lindsay (Edmund); John Hurt (The Fool); David Threlfall (Edgar)	Elliott set his Lear in an environment resembling Stonehenge, although the production was entirely shot in a studio. In keeping with the primitive backdrop, this production emphasizes the primitive over the sophisticated. Shakespeare's characters use the clothing, weapons, and technology of the early Bronze Age rather than the Elizabethan era. Olivier's Lear in this production garnered great acclaim, winning him an Emmy for the performance. It was the last of Olivier's appearances in a Shakespeare play. At 75, he was one of the oldest actors to take on this enormously demanding role. (He had previously played it in 1946 at the Old Vic, without much success.)
Ran (Japanese: 乱, lit. 'Chaos)'	Film	(Japan); (France)	1985	Akira Kurosawa (Japanese: 黒澤 明)	Tatsuya Nakadai (Great Lord Hidetora Ichimonji); Jinpachi Nezu (Lord Jiro); Daisuke Ryu (Lord Saburo); Masayuki Yui (Tango); Peter (Kyoami); Mieko Harada (Lady Kaede)	An adaptation of the story in a Japanese setting, Ran was Kurosawa's last epic, and has often been cited as amongst his finest achievements. With a budget of $11 million, it was the most expensive Japanese film ever produced up to that time.
King Lear	Film	(United States)	1987	Jean-Luc Godard	Jean-Luc Godard (Professor Pluggy); Burgess Meredith (Don Learo); Molly Ringwald (Cordelia); Peter Sellars (William Shakespeare Junior the Fifth); Woody Allen (Mr. Alien)	Adapted as post-Chernobyl disaster science fiction. Rather than reproducing a performance of Shakespeare's play, the film is more concerned with the issues raised by the text, and symbolically explores the relationships between power and virtue, between fathers and daughters, words and images. The film deliberately does not use conventional Hollywood film-making techniques which make a film 'watchable', but instead seeks to alienate and baffle its audience in the manner of Berthold Brecht.
Gypsy Lore (Hungarian: Romani kris - Cigánytörvény)	Film	(Hungary)	1997	Bence Gyöngyössy	Đoko Rosić (Lovér); Mihály Szabados (Tamáska); Silvia Pincu (Ilka); Diliana Dimitrova (Kukunda); Violetta Koleva (Sarolta)	
A Thousand Acres	Film	(United States)	1997	Jocelyn Moorhouse	Jason Robards (Larry Cook); Jessica Lange (Ginny); Michelle Pfeiffer (Rose); Jennifer Jason Leigh (Caroline)	A modern retelling of the Lear story, from the perspective of the Goneril character (Ginny).
King Lear	TV	(United Kingdom)	1997	Richard Eyre	Ian Holm (Lear); Barbara Flynn (Goneril); Amanda Redman (Regan); Victoria Hamilton (Cordelia); Timothy West (Gloucester); Finbar Lynch (Edmund); Paul Rhys (Edgar)	BBC film of the Royal National Theatre's stage version. It was televised with an accompanying documentary, including interviews with the director and cast.
King Lear	Film	(United Kingdom)	1999	Brian Blessed	Brian Blessed (King Lear); Hildegarde Neil (the Fool); Jason Riddington (Cordelia); Claire Laurie (Regan); Caroline Lennon (Goneril)	Apart from Peter Brook's 1971 adaptation, Blessed's is the only other feature-length film adaptation to preserve Shakespeare's verse. Yvonne Griggs, in Shakespeare's King Lear: A close study of the relationship between text and film (2009), characterised it as "a very stilted costume drama".
The Tragedy of King Lear	Screenplay	(United Kingdom)	2000			An unfilmed screenplay written by Harold Pinter on a commission from Tim Roth.
King of Texas	TV	(United States)	2002	Uli Edel	Patrick Stewart (John Lear); Marcia Gay Harden (Mrs. Susannah Lear Tumlinson); Lauren Holly (Mrs. Rebecca Lear Highsmith); Roy Scheider (Henry Westover); David Alan Grier (Rip)	A Western adaptation of King Lear, the film takes the plot of the play and places it in the Republic of Texas during the 19th century.
King Lear	TV	(United Kingdom)	2008	Trevor Nunn	Ian McKellen (King Lear); Romola Garai (Cordelia); Frances Barber (Goneril); Monica Dolan (Regan)	It features the same cast and director as the 2007 RSC production, and started filming only a few days after the final performance at the New London Theatre, at Pinewood Studios in Buckinghamshire.
King Lear	TV	(United Kingdom); (United States)	2018	Richard Eyre	Anthony Hopkins (King Lear); Emma Thompson (Goneril); Emily Watson (Regan); Florence Pugh (Cordelia); Andrew Scott (Edgar)	Set in an alternative universe, 21st-century, highly militarised London.

=== Macbeth ===
Title	M	C	Y	Directors	Starring	Description
Macbeth	Silent	(United States)	1908	J. Stuart Blackton	William Ranous (Macbeth); Paul Panzer (Macduff); Charles Kent (Duncan); Louise Carver (Lady Macbeth)	The earliest known film version of that play. It was a black and white silent film with English intertitles. It is currently unknown if any print of the film still exists.
Macbeth	Silent	(France)	1909	André Calmettes	Paul Mounet (Macbeth); Jeanne Delvair (Lady Macbeth)	A silent black-and-white film with French intertitles.
Macbeth	Silent	(Italy)	1909	Mario Caserini	Dante Cappelli (Macbeth); Maria Caserini (Lady Macbeth); Amleto Palormi; Ettore Pesci	The second adaptation that year, and the third film version. In black-and-white, the runtime is 16 minutes.
Macbeth	Silent	(United Kingdom)	1911	Will Barker	Frank Benson (Macbeth); Constance Benson (Lady Macbeth)	Like all films of the time, it is silent with English intertitles, black-and-white, and ran for 14 minutes. No prints are known to exist.
Macbeth	Silent	(German Empire)	1913	Arthur Bourchier	Arthur Bourchier (Macbeth); Violet Vanbrugh (Lady Macbeth)	47-minute silent adaptation. It is considered to be lost, but according to Carl Bennett in The Progressive Silent Film List, a print may exist at the George Eastman Museum's International Museum of Photography and Film.
Macbeth	Silent	(France)	1915	Charles le Bargy	Séverin-Mars (Macbeth); Georgette Leblanc (Lady Macbeth)	A silent black-and-white film with French intertitles.
Macbeth	Silent	(United States)	1916	John Emerson	Sir Herbert Beerbohm Tree (Macbeth); Constance Collier (Lady Macbeth); Wilfred Lucas (Macduff); Spottiswoode Aitken (Duncan); Ralph Lewis (Banquo); Mary Alden (Lady Macduff); Olga Grey (Lady Agnes)	The film stars Herbert Beerbohm Tree and Constance Collier, both famous from the stage and for playing Shakespearean parts. Although released during the first decade of feature filmmaking, it was already the seventh version of Macbeth to be produced, one of eight of the silent film era. It is considered to be a lost film. The running time is 80 minutes. In the companion book to his Hollywood television series, Kevin Brownlow states that Sir Herbert Tree failed to understand that the production was a silent film and that speech was not needed so much as pantomime. Tree, who had performed the play numerous times on the stage, kept spouting reams of dialogue. So Emerson and Fleming simply removed the film and cranked an empty camera so as not to waste film when he did so.
The Real Thing at Last	Silent	(United Kingdom)	1916	L. C. MacBean; J. M. Barrie	Edmund Gwenn (Macbeth); Nelson Keys (Lady Macbeth); Ernest Thesiger (Witch); Pauline Chase (American Witch); Marie Lohr (Murdered); Frederick Kerr (Murdered)	A satirical silent adaptation. It was written in 1916 by Peter Pan creator and playwright J. M. Barrie as a parody of the American entertainment industry. The film was made by the newly created British Actors Film Company in response to news that American filmmaker D. W. Griffith intended to honor the 300th anniversary of Shakespeare's death with the production of a film version. No copies of The Real Thing at Last are known to survive. It parodies the sensationalism of the American entertainment of the day, contrasting it with more reserved British sensibilities. It loosely follows the plot of the play, but two versions of each depicted scene are shown: In the British version, Lady Macbeth wiped a small amount of blood from her hands; in the American she had to wash away gallons of the stuff. In the British, the witches danced around a small cauldron; in the American the witches became dancing beauties cavorting around a huge cauldron. In the British, Macbeth and Macduff fought in a ditch; in the American Macbeth falls to his death from a skyscraper.
Macbeth	Silent	(United Kingdom)	1922	H. B. Parkinson	Russell Thorndike (Macbeth); Sybil Thorndike (Lady Macbeth)	The last silent version, and the eighth film adaptation of the play.
Macbeth	Film	(United States)	1948	Orson Welles	Orson Welles (Macbeth); Jeanette Nolan (Lady Macbeth); Dan O'Herlihy (Macduff); Roddy McDowall (Malcolm); Edgar Barrier (Banquo)	
Macbeth	Film		1950s	Laurence Olivier		An unsuccessful mid-1950s attempt by Olivier to finance a new film version.
Marmayogi (Tamil: மர்மயோகி, lit. 'The Mysterious Sage, Hindi: एक था राजा, romanized: Ek Tha Raja, lit. 'Once There Was A King')'	Film	(India)	1951	K. Ramnoth	Serukalathur Sama (Marmayogi); M. G. Ramachandran (Karikalan); S. V. Sahasranamam (Veerangan); S. A. Natarajan (Urvasi's Lover)	A film adaptation of the novel Vengeance by Marie Corelli and Macbeth. The film was shot simultaneously in Tamil and Hindi.
"Macbeth" (Hallmark Hall of Fame)	TV	(United States)	1954	George Schaefer	Maurice Evans (Macbeth); Judith Anderson (Lady Macbeth); House Jameson (Duncan); Staats Cotsworth (Banquo); Richard Waring (Macduff)	A live television adaptation telecast in color, but has only been preserved on black-and-white kinescope.
Joe MacBeth	Film	(United Kingdom)	1955	Ken Hughes	Paul Douglas (Joe MacBeth); Ruth Roman (Lily MacBeth); Bonar Colleano (Lennie); Grégoire Aslan (Duca); Sid James (Banky)	A modern retelling set in a 1930s American criminal underworld. The film's plot closely follows the original.
Throne of Blood (Japanese: 蜘蛛巣城, romanized: Kumonosu-jō, lit. 'Spider Web Castle)'	Film	(Japan)	1957	Akira Kurosawa	Toshiro Mifune (Washizu Taketoki); Isuzu Yamada (Washizu Asaji); Takashi Shimura (Odakura Noriyasu); Akira Kubo (Miki Yoshiteru); Minoru Chiaki (Miki Yoshiaki)	The film transposes the plot from Medieval Scotland to feudal Japan, with stylistic elements drawn from Noh drama. As with the play, the film tells the story of a warrior who assassinates his sovereign at the urging of his ambitious wife. Despite the change in setting and language and numerous creative liberties, in the West Throne of Blood is often considered one of the best film adaptations of the play.
Macbeth	TV	(United States)	1960	George Schaefer	Maurice Evans (Macbeth); Judith Anderson (Lady Macbeth); Michael Hordern (Banquo); Ian Bannen (Macduff); Malcolm Keen (King Duncan)	A filmed-on-location adaptation with the same two stars and director as the 1954 production. Shown on TV in the US and in theatres in Europe.
Macbeth	TV	(Australia)	1960	William Sterling	Ken Goodlet (Macbeth); Dinah Shearing (Lady Macbeth); Keith Eden (Macduff); Douglas Kelly (Duncan); Wyn Roberts (Banquo)	The Sydney Morning Herald wrote that the production as "visually efficient" but also "a dreadful warning of what can happen when a producer becomes frightened of a great text... a torrent of gabble and shouting. Some of the most concise dramatic poetry in all Shakespeare received treatment worthy of the race results."
Macbeth	TV	(Canada)	1961	Paul Almond	Sean Connery (Macbeth); Zoe Caldwell (Lady Macbeth); William Needles (Banquo); Ted Follows (Macduff); Robin Gammell (Malcolm); Powys Thomas (King Duncan)	
Macbeth	TV	(Australia)	1965	Alan Burke	Wyn Roberts (Macbeth); Terri Aldred (Lady Macbeth); Keith Eden (Macduff); Keith Lee (Banquo); Peter Hepworth (Fleance)	
"Macbeth" (Play of the Month)	TV	(United Kingdom)	1970	John Gorrie	Eric Porter (Macbeth); Janet Suzman (Lady Macbeth); John Thaw (Banquo); John Woodvine (MacDuff); John Alderton (Malcolm); Michael Goodliffe (Duncan)	
Macbeth	Film	(United States); (United Kingdom)	1971	Roman Polanski	Jon Finch (Macbeth); Francesca Annis (Lady Macbeth); Martin Shaw (Banquo); Terence Bayler (Macduff); Nicholas Selby (King Duncan)	
Macbeth	TV	(United Kingdom)	1978	Philip Casson (TV); Trevor Nunn (stage)	Ian McKellen (Macbeth); Judi Dench (Lady Macbeth); Griffith Jones (Duncan); Ian McDiarmid (Porter); Bob Peck (Macduff); John Woodvine (Banquo)	Videotaped version of Nunn's Royal Shakespeare Company production produced by Thames Television. The original stage production was performed at The Other Place, the RSC's small studio theatre in Stratford-upon-Avon. It had been performed in the round before small audiences, with a bare stage and simple costuming. The recording preserves this style: the actors perform on a circular set and with a mostly black background; changes of setting are indicated only by lighting changes.
Macbeth (The Shakespeare Collection)	Video	(United States)	1981	Arthur Allan Seidelman	Jeremy Brett (Macbeth); Piper Laurie (Lady Macbeth); Simon MacCorkindale (Macduff); Richard Alfieri (Malcolm); Barry Primus (Banquo)	
Macbeth	TV	(Hungary)	1982	Béla Tarr	György Cserhalmi (Macbeth); Erzsébet Kútvölgyi (Lady Macbeth)	The film is composed of only two shots: The first shot (before the main title) is five minutes long, the second 57 minutes long.
"Macbeth" (BBC Television Shakespeare)	TV	(United Kingdom)	1983	Jack Gold	Nicol Williamson (Macbeth); Jane Lapotaire (Lady Macbeth); Mark Dignam (Duncan); Ian Hogg (Banquo); Alistair Henderson (Fleance)	
Macbeth	Film	(France)	1987	Claude d'Anna	Leo Nucci (Macbeth); Shirley Verrett (Lady Macbeth); Samuel Ramey (Banco (voice)); Johan Leysen (Banco); Veriano Luchetti (Macduff (voice)); Philippe Volter (Macduff)	A film adaptation of Verdi's opera Macbeth (libretto by Francesco Maria Piave based on Shakespeare's play). It was screened out of competition at the 1987 Cannes Film Festival.
Men of Respect	Film	(United States)	1990	William C. Reilly	John Turturro (Mike Battaglia); Katherine Borowitz (Ruthie Battaglia); Dennis Farina (Bankie Como); Peter Boyle (Matt Duffy); Rod Steiger (Charlie D'Amico)	
"Macbeth" (Shakespeare: The Animated Tales)	TV	(Russia); (United Kingdom)	1992	Nicolai Serebryakov	Alec McCowen (Narrator); Brian Cox (Macbeth); Zoë Wanamaker (Lady Macbeth); Laurence Payne (Duncan); Patrick Brennan (Banquo)	
Macbeth	TV	(United Kingdom)	1997	Jeremy Freeston	Jason Connery (Macbeth); Helen Baxendale (Lady Macbeth); Graham McTavish (Banquo)	
Macbeth on the Estate	TV	(United Kingdom)	1997	Penny Woolcock	James Frain (Macbeth); Susan Vidler (Lady Macbeth); Andrew Tiernan (Banquo); Ray Winstone (Duncan); David Harewood (MacDuff)	Modern-setting version in a world of drugs and drug kingpins.
Macbeth	TV	(United Kingdom)	1998	Michael Bogdanov	Sean Pertwee (Macbeth); Greta Scacchi (Lady Macbeth); Philip Madoc (Duncan); Michael Maloney (Banquo); Shane Richie (Porter)	
Makibefo	Film	(Madagascar)	1999	Alexander Abela	Martin Zia (Makibefo); Neoliny Dety (Valy Makibefo); Jean-Félix (Danikany); Bien Rasoanan Tenaina (Malikomy); Jean-Noël (Makidofy)	Filming took place near the town of Faux Cap, Madagascar, with a single technical assistant. With the exception of an English-speaking narrator, all the roles are played by indigenous Antandroy people (few of whom had ever seen a movie before) who performed a largely improvised story based on Macbeth set in a remote fishing village.
Macbeth	TV	(United Kingdom)	2001	Greg Doran	Ken Bones (Banquo); Nigel Cooke (Macduff); Stephen Noonan (Porter); Antony Sher (Macbeth); Harriet Walter (Lady Macbeth)	Royal Shakespeare Company
Rave Macbeth	Film	(Germany)	2001	Michael Rosenbaum	Michael Rosenbaum (Marcus); Nicki Aycox (Lidia); Kirk Baltz (Dean); Jamie Elman (Troy); Marguerite Moreau (Helena)	A loose adaptation set in rave culture.
Scotland, PA	Film	(United States)	2001	William Morrissette	James Le Gros (Joe McBeth); Maura Tierney (Pat McBeth); Christopher Walken (Lieutenant McDuff); Kevin Corrigan (Anthony Banconi); James Rebhorn (Norm Duncan)	Adaptation made to look like 1970s small town America, with castles replaced by fast food restaurants, kings by their managers, blood splatter with a grease burn, and the witches by hippies.
Maqbool (Hindi: मक़बूल Urdu: مقبُول)	Film	(India)	2003	Vishal Bhardwaj	Irrfan Khan (Miyan Maqbool); Tabu (Nimmi); Pankaj Kapoor (Jahangir Khan); Piyush Mishra (Kaka); Ankur Vikal (Riyaz Boti)	
"Macbeth" (ShakespeaRe-Told)	TV	(United Kingdom)	2005	Mark Brozel	Vincent Regan (Duncan Docherty); James McAvoy (Joe Macbeth); Keeley Hawes (Ella Macbeth); Joseph Millson (Billy Banquo); Toby Kebbell (Malcolm); Richard Armitage (Peter Macduff)	Set in a three Michelin star restaurant owned by celebrity chef Duncan Docherty, with Joe Macbeth as the sous chef and his wife Ella as the Maître d'. Joe and his fellow chef Billy Banquo are annoyed that Duncan takes the credit for Joe's work, and that Duncan's son Malcolm has no real flair for the business. Then they encounter three supernatural binmen who predict that Macbeth will get ownership of the restaurant, as will Billy's children. Joe and Ella are inspired to kill Duncan, but the binmen subsequently warn that Macbeth should be wary of Peter Macduff, the head waiter.
Macbeth	Film	(Australia)	2006	Geoffrey Wright	Sam Worthington (Macbeth); Victoria Hill (Lady Macbeth); Lachy Hulme (Macduff); Gary Sweet (Duncan); Steve Bastoni (Banquo)	Sets the story in a modern-day Melbourne gangster setting, and the actors deliver the dialogue in Australian accents, largely maintains the language of the original play.
Macbeth	TV	(South Africa)	2009			An episode of South African miniseries Death of a Queen.
Macbeth	TV	(United Kingdom)	2010	Rupert Goold	Patrick Stewart (Macbeth); Kate Fleetwood (Lady Macbeth); Martin Turner (Banquo); Michael Feast (Macduff); Ben Carpenter (Donalbain); Paul Shelley (Duncan)	Based on Goold's stage adaptation for the Chichester Festival Theatre in 2007. The film specifically evokes the atmosphere of the Soviet Union under Joseph Stalin, with subtle parallels between Stalin and Macbeth in their equally brutal quests for power. The Three Witches likewise receive an update in keeping with the 20th century aesthetics, appearing as hospital nurses. Their presence is pervasive throughout the film, punctuating the horror of Macbeth's murderous reign. The film was filmed entirely on location at Welbeck Abbey.
Shakespeare Must Die (Thai: เชคสเปียร์ต้องตาย)	Film	(Thailand)	2012	Ing Kanjanavanit	Pissara Umavijani (Lady Macduff); Pisarn Pattanapeeradej (Mekhdeth); Ajon Kibreab (Lennox); Pirun Anusuriya (Angus); Totrakul Jantima (Bangkho); Nam-ob Semsisom (Macduff's Daughter); Fiona Tarini Graham (Khunying Mekhdeth)	Thai-language film that tells the story of a theatre group in a fictional country resembling Thailand, that is staging a production of Macbeth. One of the film's main characters is a dictator named Dear Leader, who bears a resemblance to former Thai leader Thaksin Shinawatra, who was ousted in a 2006 coup which sparked years of political turmoil between his supporters and critics. The Thai government banned the film fearing it would cause societal disunity.
Macbeth	Film	(United Kingdom); (France); (United States)	2015	Justin Kurzel	Michael Fassbender (Macbeth); Marion Cotillard (Lady Macbeth); Paddy Considine (Banquo); Sean Harris (Macduff); Jack Reynor (Malcolm); Elizabeth Debicki (Lady Macduff); David Thewlis (King Duncan)	
Thane of East County	Film	(United States)	2015	Jesse Keller	Carr Cavender / Karl Backus (Macbeth); Molly Beucher (Lady Macbeth); Connor Sullivan (Banquo); Brian Patrick Butler (Macduff / Malcolm)	Things go awry as actors on a production of Macbeth begin to carry out the actions of characters they portray.
Veeram (Malayalam: വീരം, lit. 'Valour)'	Film	(India)	2016	Jayaraj	Kunal Kapoor (Chandu Chekaver); Shivajith Nambiar (Aromal Chekaver); Himarsha Venkatsamy (Unniyarcha); Satheesh Menon (Raman Chekaver)	The film, which also takes inspirations from the Vadakkan Pattukal (Northern Ballads) of the North Malabar region in Kerala, tells the story of Chandu Chekavar, an infamous 13th century warrior. Veeram is simultaneously made in Malayalam, Hindi, and in English with the same title.
Joji	Film	(India)	2021	Dileesh Pothan	Fahadh Faasil (Joji Panachel); Baburaj (Jomon Panachel); Joji Mundakayam (Jaison Panachel); Sunny PN (Kuttappan P K Panachel); Unnimaya Prasad (Bincy)	
Mandaar	TV	(India)	2021	Anirban Bhattacharya	Debasish Mondal (Mandaar); Sohini Sarkar (Laili); Anirban Bhattacharya (Muqaddar Mukherjee); Debesh Roychowdhury (Dablu Bhai); Sumana Mukhopadhyay (Dablu Bhai's Wife); Sankar Debnath (Bonka)	A Bengali adaptation of the play, the series revolves around Mandaar, a young gangster, who kills his master, Dablu Bhai, to rise to the powerful seat of the fishing industry in the village of Geilpur.
The Tragedy of Macbeth	Film	(United States)	2021	Joel Coen	Denzel Washington (Macbeth); Frances McDormand (Lady Macbeth); Brendan Gleeson (Duncan); Corey Hawkins (Macduff); Moses Ingram (Lady Macduff); Harry Melling (Malcolm); Ralph Ineson (The Captain); Sean Patrick Thomas (Monteith); Stephen Root	

=== Othello ===
Title	M	C	Y	Directors	Starring	Description
Otello	Silent	(Italy)	1906	Mario Caserini; Gaston Velle	Ubaldo Maria Del Colle (Othello); Mario Caserini (Iago); Maria Caserini (Desdemona); Fernanda Negri Pouget	A silent film adaptation based on Giuseppe Verdi's 1887 opera of the same name (which in turn is based on Othello). It is believed to be the earliest film adaptation of the play.
Othello	Silent	(Germany)	1922	Dimitri Buchowetzki	Emil Jannings (Othello); Werner Krauss (Iago); Ica von Lenkeffy (Desdemona); Theodor Loos (Cassio)	The first of six major film productions of the work.
Othello	Film	(United Kingdom)	1946	David MacKane	John Slater (Othello); Luanna Shaw (Desdemona); Sebastian Cabot (Iago); Sheila Raynor (Emilia)	
A Double Life	Film	(United States)	1947	George Cukor	Ronald Colman (Anthony John); Signe Hasso (Brita); Edmond O'Brien (Bill Friend); Shelley Winters (Pat Kroll); Ray Collins (Victor Donlan); Philip Loeb (Max Lasker); Millard Mitchell (Al Cooley)	A noir adaptation in which an actor playing the moor takes on frightening aspects of his character's personality. Celebrated stage actor Anthony John has driven away his actress wife Brita with his erratic temper. However, they star together in a staging of Othello. Gradually, his portrayal of a jealous murderer undermines his sanity, and he kills his mistress, Pat Kroll. Colman won the Academy Award as best actor for his performance in this film.
Othello	Film	(Morocco); (Italy)	1951	Orson Welles	Orson Welles (Othello); Micheál MacLiammóir (Iago); Robert Coote (Roderigo); Suzanne Cloutier (Desdemona); Hilton Edwards (Brabantio)	Welles trimmed the source material, which is generally around three hours when performed, down to a little over 90 minutes for the film. One of Welles's more complicated shoots, Othello was filmed erratically over three years. Shooting began in 1949, but was forced to shut down when the film's original Italian producer announced on one of the first days of shooting that he was bankrupt. Instead of abandoning filming altogether, Welles as director began pouring his own money into the project. When he ran out of money as well, he needed to stop filming for months at a time to raise money, mostly by taking part in other productions.
Othello (Russian: Отелло)	Film	(Soviet Union)	1956	Sergei Yutkevich	Sergei Bondarchuk (Othello); Irina Skobtseva (Desdemona); Andrei Popov (Iago)	
Jubal	Film	(United States)	1956	Delmer Daves	Glenn Ford (Jubal Troop); Ernest Borgnine (Shep Horgan); Rod Steiger (Pinkum); Valerie French (Mae Horgan); Felicia Farr (Naomi); Charles Bronson (Reb Haislipp)	A Western based on a 1939 novel by Paul Wellman, it was filmed in Technicolor and CinemaScope on location in Jackson Hole, Wyoming. The film is notable as a western reworking of Othello.
All Night Long	Film	(United Kingdom)	1962	Basil Dearden	Patrick McGoohan (Johnnie Cousin); Paul Harris (Aurelius Rex); Marti Stevens (Delia Lane)	An adaptation set in the contemporary London jazz scene.
Othello	Film	(United Kingdom)	1965	Stuart Burge	Laurence Olivier (Othello); Frank Finlay (Iago); Maggie Smith (Desdemona); Derek Jacobi (Cassio)	A film of the Royal National Theatre's stage production. Olivier, Smith, Redman, and Finlay all received Academy Award nominations, and it was the film debuts for both Derek Jacobi and Michael Gambon.
Othello	TV	(Australia)	1965	Patrick Barton	Raymond Westwell (Othello); Keith Lee (Iago); Frances McDonald (Desdemona); Joan MacArthur (Emilia)	An Australian TV play, it was broadcast on the ABC as part of Wednesday Theatre and filmed in the ABC's Melbourne studios.
Othello-67	Film	(Soviet Union)	1967	Fyodor Khitruk		A 50-second animated parody made for Montreal's Expo 67.
Catch My Soul	Film	(United States)	1974	Patrick McGoohan	Richie Havens (Othello); Lance LeGault (Iago); Season Hubley (Desdemona); Tony Joe White (Cassio)	Adapted from the rock musical based on the play.
"Othello" (BBC Television Shakespeare)	TV	(United Kingdom)	1981	Jonathan Miller	Anthony Hopkins (Othello); Bob Hoskins (Iago); Penelope Wilton (Desdemona)	Released in the US as part of the Complete Dramatic Works of William Shakespeare series.
Othello	TV	(United Kingdom)	1990	Trevor Nunn	Willard White (Othello); Imogen Stubbs (Desdemona); Ian McKellen (Iago); Zoë Wanamaker (Emilia)	Based on a stage production directed by Trevor Nunn for the Royal Shakespeare Company, and later adapted for TV. It was shot in a studio with minimal props and scenery, and aired as en episode of Theatre Night. The sets, costumes, and props are from the American Civil War, but the dialogue remains tied to Venice and Cyprus. In contrast with Antony and Cleopatra (1974) and Macbeth (1979), Nunn preferred "contemplative" medium shots over extreme closeups. The film makes little attempt to hide that it is a filmed stage production, and Michael Brooke, writing about the film for BFI Screenonline, thinks this is because Nunn's state purpose was to preserve the stage production for posterity. The film presents almost the complete text of the play, leaving out just one scene with Cassio and the clown.
"Othello" (Shakespeare: The Animated Tales)	TV	(Russia); (United Kingdom)	1994	Nicolai Serebryakov	Colin McFarlane (Othello); Gerald McSorley (Iago); Sian Thomas (Desdemona)	
Othello	Film	(United States)	1995	Oliver Parker	Laurence Fishburne (Othello); Kenneth Branagh (Iago); Irene Jacob (Desdemona)	The first cinematic reproduction of the play released by a major studio with an African American in the role of Othello, although low-budget independent films of the play starring Ted Lange and Yaphet Kotto predated it.
Kaliyattam (Malayalam: കളിയാട്ടം, lit. 'The Play of God)'	Film	(India)	1997	Jayaraaj	Suresh Gopi (Kannan Perumalayan); Lal (Paniyan); Manju Warrier (Thamara); Biju Menon (Kanthan); Bindu Panicker (Cheerma); Narendra Prasad (Thamburan)	An adaptation of the play against the backdrop of the Hindu Theyyam performance. Gopi received the National Film Award for Best Actor, and Jayaraaj the award for Best Director for their work on the film.
O	Film	(United States)	2001	Tim Blake Nelson	Mekhi Phifer (Odin James); Josh Hartnett (Hugo Goulding); Julia Stiles (Desi Brable); Elden Henson (Roger Calhoun); Andrew Keegan (Michael Cassio); Rain Phoenix (Emily); Martin Sheen (Coach Duke Goulding)	A loose adaptation set in an American high school.
Othello	TV	(United Kingdom)	2001	Geoffrey Sax	Eamonn Walker (John Othello); Christopher Eccleston (Ben Jago); Keeley Hawes (Dessie Brabant); Richard Coyle (Michael Cass); Rachael Stirling (Lulu); Del Synnott (PC Alan Roderick); Bill Paterson (Sinclair Carver); Joss Ackland (James Brabant)	An adaptation by Andrew Davies set in the police force in modern London.
Souli	Film	(France); (Madagascar); (United Kingdom)	2004	Alexander Abela	Eduardo Noriega (Carlos); Aurélien Recoing (Yann); Makena Diop (Souli); Fatou N'Diaye (Abi); Jeanne Antebi (Mona)	A post-colonial take on the play, set in a remote fishing village.
Omkara (Hindi: ओमकारा, Urdu: امکارا)	Film	(India)	2006	Vishal Bhardwaj	Ajay Devgan (Omkara Shukla); Saif Ali Khan (Ishwar Tyagi); Vivek Oberoi (Keshav Upadhyaya); Kareena Kapoor (Dolly Mishra); Bipasha Basu (Billo Chamanbahar); Konkona Sen Sharma (Indu Tyagi); Deepak Dobriyal (Rajan Tiwari); Naseeruddin Shah (Bhaisaab)	
Jarum Halus (Malay: Jarum Halus, lit. 'Fine Needle')	Film	(Malaysia)	2008	Mark Tan	Christien New (Daniel Oh); Juliana Ibrahim (Mona); Razif Hashim (Iskandar); Rahim Razali (Datuk Kalel); Justin Chan (Michael); Farah Putri (Emilia)	
Iago	Film	(Italy)	2009	Volfango De Biasi	Nicolas Vaporidis (Iago); Laura Chiatti (Desdemona); Gabriele Lavia (Brabanzio)	Iago is an architecture school student about to graduate who falls in love with his fellow student Desdemona, the noble and beautiful daughter of the academic dean, professor Brabanzio.
Hrid Majharey (Bengali: হৃদ্‌ মাঝারে, lit. 'Live in my Heart)'	Film	(India)	2014	Ranjan Ghosh	Abir Chatterjee (Abhijit Mukherjee); Raima Sen (Debjani); Indrasish Roy (Subhro Sarkar); Barun Chanda (Professor Sen)	A tragic love story loosely inspired by Othello, the film is a tribute to the Bard on his 450th Birth Anniversary. Elements of Shakespeare's Macbeth and Julius Caesar are also found in this love tragedy.
Chocolat	Film	(France)	2016	Roschdy Zem	Omar Sy (Chocolat as Othello)	A loose biopic about the first black clown in France. Chocolat tries to branch into Shakespearean tragedy and plays Othello as the first black actor in this role in France. After the premiere, part of the audience boos the "clown". Chocolat leaves the theater in costume and is beaten by debt collectors.
Athhoi (Bengali: অথৈ)	Film	(India)	2024	Arna Mukhopadhyay	Arna Mukhopadhyay (Athhoi Kumar Lodha); Sohini Sarkar (Diyamona Mukherjee); Anirban Bhattacharya (Anagra Chatterjee)	

=== Romeo and Juliet ===
Title	M	C	Y	Directors	Starring	Description
Romeo and Juliet (French: Roméo et Juliette)	Film	(France)	1900	Clément Maurice	Emilio Cossira (Romeo)	Features Cossira singing a tenor aria from Charles Gounod's Roméo et Juliette. It is believed to be the earliest film adaptation of Romeo and Juliet. The film was produced by "Phono-Cinéma-Théâtre", which premiered one of the first synchronized sound film systems at the Paris exhibition of 1900, with this film being one of the earliest to use the sound technique. The sound was recorded first using a Lioretograph onto a cellophane cylinder. This was then played back, and the actors filmed lip-syncing to the recording. To view the film, the sound was played back and the projectionist altered the speed of the hand-cranked projector to try to match the playback.
Romeo and Juliet	Silent	(United States)	1908	J. Stuart Blackton	Paul Panzer (Romeo); Florence Lawrence (Juliet); John G. Adolfi (Tybalt); Louise Carver (Nurse); William V. Ranous (Friar Lawrence)	Now considered lost, this was the first American film version of Romeo and Juliet. It was a short made by Vitagraph Studios, and was filmed at Bethesda Terrace in Manhattan, New York.
Romeo and Juliet	Silent	(United States)	1916	John W. Noble; Francis X. Bushman	Francis X. Bushman (Romeo); Beverly Bayne (Juliet); John Davidson (Paris); Fritz Leiber, Sr. (Mercutio); Olav Skavlan (Benvolio); Lawson Butt (Tybalt); Robert Cummings (Friar Laurence)	This film was produced for the 300th anniversary of Shakespeare's death, and was released amongst many other commemorations of the "Bard". It was released in direct competition with another adaptation, produced by William Fox, starring Theda Bara, and released three days later. Bushman later claimed, in an interview, that he went to see the Theda Bara version and was shocked to see that Fox had added some intertitles from the Metro version.
Romeo and Juliet	Silent	(United States)	1916	J. Gordon Edwards	Theda Bara (Juliet); Harry Hilliard (Romeo); Glen White (Mercutio); Walter Law (Friar Laurence); John Webb Dillon (Tybalt); Alice Gale (Nurse); Victory Bateman (Lady Montague)	The film was produced by the Fox Film Corporation, and was shot at the Fox Studio in Fort Lee, New Jersey. It was released in direct competition with another feature-length Romeo and Juliet film from Metro Pictures. In a recorded interview, Francis Bushman, who directed the competing film, claimed that William Fox had spies working for Metro, and stole some of the intertitles from the Metro version. Fox rushed his version into the theatres in order to capitalize on exhibiting his film first. Bushman recalled going to see Fox's Romeo and Juliet and was startled to see the intertitles from his film flash on the screen.
Romeo and Juliet	Film	(United States)	1936	George Cukor	Norma Shearer (Juliet); Leslie Howard (Romeo); John Barrymore (Mercutio); Edna May Oliver (the Nurse); Basil Rathbone (Tybalt); Ralph Forbes (Paris); Henry Kolker (Friar Laurence)	One of the three major film adaptations (along with Franco Zeffirelli in 1968 and Baz Luhrmann in 1996) of Romeo and Juliet. The New York Times selected the film as one of the "Best 1,000 Movies Ever Made", calling it "a lavish production" and "extremely well-produced and acted."
Romeo and Juliet (Spanish: Julieta y Romeo)	Film	(Spain)	1940	José María Castellví	Juan Barajas; Arturo Cámara; Marta Flores; Marta Grau; Enrique Guitart	
The Lovers of Verona (French: Les amants de Vérone)	Film	(France)	1949	André Cayatte	Serge Reggiani (Angelo); Anouk Aimée (Georgia); Martine Carol (Bettina Verdi); Pierre Brasseur (Rafaële); Marcel Dalio (Amedeo Maglia)	
Romeo and Juliet (Spanish: Romeo y Julita)	Film	(Argentina)	1953	Enrique Carreras	Alfredo Barbieri; Amelia Vargas; Esteban Serrador; Susana Campos; Tito Climent; Guido Gorgatti; Domingo Márquez	
Romeo and Juliet	Film	(United Kingdom); (Italy)	1954	Renato Castellani	John Gielgud (Chorus); Laurence Harvey (Romeo); Susan Shentall (Juliet); Flora Robson (Nurse); Mervyn Johns (Friar Laurence); Bill Travers (Benvolio); Sebastian Cabot (Lord Capulet); Ubaldo Zollo (Mercutio); Enzo Fiermonte (Tybalt)	
Romeo and Juliet (Russian: Ромео и Джульетта, romanized: Romeo i Dzhulyetta)	Film	(Soviet Union)	1955	Lev Arnshtam	Galina Ulanova (Juliet); Yuri Zhdanov (Romeo); Aleksandr Radunsky (Lord Capulet); Aleksey Yermolayev (Tybalt); Sergei Koren (Mercutio)	
Romeo, Juliet and Darkness (Czech: Romeo, Julie a tma)	Film	(Czechoslovakia)	1960	Jiří Weiss	Ivan Mistrík (Pavel); Daniela Smutná (Hanka); Jiřina Šejbalová (Pavel's mother); František Smolík (Grandfather); Blanka Bohdanová (Kubiasová)	
West Side Story	Film	(United States)	1961	Robert Wise; Jerome Robbins	Natalie Wood (Maria Nunez); Richard Beymer (Tony Wyzek); Russ Tamblyn (Riff Lorton); Rita Moreno (Anita); George Chakiris (Bernardo Nunez); Simon Oakland (Lieutenant Schrank); Ned Glass (Doc)	An adaptation of the 1957 Broadway musical, which in turn was inspired by Romeo and Juliet. The film received high praise from critics and the public, and became the second highest grossing film of the year in the United States. The film was nominated for 11 Academy Awards and won 10, including Best Picture (as well as a special award for Robbins), becoming the record holder for the most wins for a movie musical.
Romanoff and Juliet	Film	(United States)	1961	Peter Ustinov	Peter Ustinov (The General); Sandra Dee (Juliet Moulsworth); John Gavin (Igor Romanoff); Akim Tamiroff (Vadim Romanoff); Tamara Shayne (Evdokia Romanoff)	An adaptation by way of Ustinov's play that sets the love story amids the ideologically warring communist USSR and the capitalist USA, competing for influence in a fictional European country..
Fury of Johnny Kid (Italian: Dove si spara di più, Spanish: La furia de Johnny Kidd)	Film	(Italy); (Spain)	1967	Gianni Puccini	Arthur Grant (Johnny Monter); Cristina Galbó (Jiulieta Campos); María Cuadra (Lezerind); Andrés Mejuto (Lefty); Piero Lulli (Sheriff); Peter Martell (Lodorigo Campos); Luis Induni (Father Monter)	
Romeo and Juliet	Film	(United Kingdom); (Italy)	1968	Franco Zeffirelli	Leonard Whiting (Romeo); Olivia Hussey (Juliet); John McEnery (Mercutio); Milo O'Shea (Friar Lawrence); Pat Heywood (The Nurse); Robert Stephens (The Prince); Michael York (Tybalt); Laurence Olivier (Chorus)	
Ma che musica maestro (Italian: Ma che musica maestro)	Film	(Italy)	1971	Mariano Laurenti	Gianni Nazzaro (Gianni); Agostina Belli (Giulietta Ciova); Franco Scandurra (Pompeo Ciova); Franco Franchi (Franco ); Ciccio Ingrassia (Ciccio)	
"Romeo and Juliet" (BBC Television Shakespeare)	TV	(United Kingdom)	1978	Alvin Rakoff	John Gielgud (Chorus); Patrick Ryecart (Romeo); Rebecca Saire (Juliet); Celia Johnson (Nurse); Michael Hordern (Capulet); Joseph O'Conor (Friar Laurence); Anthony Andrews (Mercutio); Alan Rickman (Tybalt)	
Another History (Telugu: మరో చరిత్ర, romanized: Maro Charitra)	Film	(India)	1978	Ravi Yadav	Kamal Haasan (Balu); Saritha (Swapna); Madhavi (Sandhya); Sarath Babu); J. V. Ramana Murthi); P. L. Narayana (K. Venkateswara Rao); S. K. Misro (Pattabhi)	
Romie-0 and Julie-8	TV	(Canada)	1979	Clive A. Smith	Greg Swanson (Romie-0); Donann Cavin (Julie-8); Marie Aloma (Ms. Passbinder); Max Ferguson (Mr. Thunderbottom); Nick Nichols (Gizmo); Bill Osler (Junk Monster)	An animated adaptation; set in the future, the two romantic leads in this version are androids who fall in love.
Monica and Jimmy Five: In the World of Romeo & Juliet (Portuguese: Mônica e Cebolinha: No Mundo de Romeu e Julieta)	TV	(Brazil)	1979	José Amâncio		
Made For Each Other (Hindi: एक दूजे के लिये, romanized: Ek Duuje Ke Liye)	Film	(India)	1981	K. Balachander	Kamal Haasan (S. Vasudevan); Rati Agnihotri (Sapna); Madhavi (Sandhya); Rakesh Bedi (Chakram); Poornam Viswanathan (V. Sivaramakrishnan); Satyen Kappu (Jagannath); Shubha Khote (Mrs. Kundanlal)	
The Sea Prince and the Fire Child (Japanese: シリウスの伝説, romanized: Shiriusu no Densetsu)	Film	(Japan); (Australia); (New Zealand)	1981	Masami Hata	Tōru Furuya (Sirius); Mami Koyama (Malta); Keiko Han (Piale); Michiko Nomura (Ruu); Ikue Sakakibara (Walla)	
The Tragedy of Romeo and Juliet	Film	(United States)	1982	William Woodman	Alex Hyde-White (Romeo); Blanche Baker (Juliet); Esther Rolle (Nurse); Norman Snow (Tybalt)	
China Girl	Film	(United States)	1987	Abel Ferrara	Richard Panebianco (Tony); Sari Chang (Tye); James Russo (Alby); Russell Wong (Yung Gan); David Caruso (Mercury)	A contemporary take on Romeo and Juliet set in 1980s Manhattan. The plot revolves around the intimate relationship developing between Tony, a teenage boy from Little Italy, and Tye, a teenage girl from Chinatown, while their older brothers are engaged in a heated gang war against each other.
From Doom to Doom (Hindi: क़यामत से क़यामत तक, romanized: Qayamat Se Qayamat Tak)	Film	(India)	1988	Mansoor Khan	Aamir Khan (Raj); Juhi Chawla (Rashmi); Goga Kapoor (Randhir Singh); Dalip Tahil (Dhanraj Singh); Alok Nath (Jaswant Singh); Rajendranath Zutshi (Shyam)	
Romeo.Juliet	Film	(United States)	1990	Armando Acosta	John Hurt (Mercutio); Robert Powell (Romeo); Francesca Annis (Juliet); Vanessa Redgrave (Mother Capulet); Ben Kingsley (Father Capulet); Maggie Smith (Rosaline); Victor Spinetti (Tybalt)	Adapted using the feral cats of Venice, New York City, and Ghent as actors, with the voices dubbed by some of the greats of the English theatre. The score of the film features music from Prokofiev's Romeo and Juliet as performed by the London Symphony Orchestra, André Previn conducting, and an original theme composed by Armando Acosta and Emanuel Vardi, performed by the London Symphony Orchestra and conducted by Barry Wordsworth.
"Romeo and Juliet" (Shakespeare: The Animated Tales)	TV	(Russia); (United Kingdom)	1992	Efim Gamburg	Felicity Kendal (Narrator); Linus Roache (Romeo); Clare Holman (Juliet); Jonathan Cullen (Benvolio); Greg Hicks (Mercutio); Brenda Bruce (Nurse); Garard Green (Friar Laurence)	
November 30 (Swedish: 30:e november)	Film	(Sweden)	1995	Daniel Fridell	Göran Gillinger (Adam); María Celedonio (Julia); Ray Jones IV (Sasha); Jonas Karlsson (Tobbe); Frida Hallgren (Sirka)	
Romeo + Juliet	Film	(United States)	1996	Baz Luhrmann	Miriam Margolyes (Nurse); Leonardo DiCaprio (Romeo Montague); Claire Danes (Juliet Capulet); Brian Dennehy (Ted Montague); Paul Sorvino (Fulgencio Capulet); Harold Perrineau (Mercutio); John Leguizamo (Tybalt Capulet); Pete Postlethwaite (Father Lawrence); Paul Rudd (Dave Paris)	A modern adaptation set in the fictional city, Verona Beach California. Capulet and Montague are CEOs of businesses in a corporate war. The dialogue is kept the same, but swords are replaced with guns, with "Sword" being the brand/make (i.e., Glock). Friar Lawrence is now Father Lawrence, a local priest who distills medicine from plants he cultivates in his private greenhouse.
Tromeo and Juliet	Film	(United States)	1996	Lloyd Kaufman	Will Keenan (Tromeo Que); Jane Jensen (Juliet Capulet); Valentine Miele (Murray Martini); Stephen Blackehart (Benny Que); Patrick Connor (Tyrone Capulet); Debbie Rochon (Ness); Lemmy (Narrator)	A more or less faithful adaptation of the play except with the addition of extreme amounts of Troma-esque sexuality and violence, as well as a revised ending.
Love Is All There Is	Film	(United States)	1996	Joseph Bologna	Lainie Kazan (Sadie Capomezzo); Joseph Bologna (Mike Capomezzo); Barbara Carrera (Maria Malacici); Paul Sorvino (Piero Malacici); Angelina Jolie (Gina Malacici); Joy Behar (Mary)	A modern retelling of the story set in the Bronx during the 1990s.
The Lion King II: Simba's Pride	Film	(United States)	1998	Darrell Rooney	Neve Campbell (Kiara); Jason Marsden (Kovu); Matthew Broderick (Simba); Moira Kelly (Nala)	An American animated direct-to-video romantic musical drama film. It is the sequel to Walt Disney Animation Studios's 1994 animated feature film, The Lion King, with its plot influenced by Romeo and Juliet.
Romeo Must Die	Film	(United States)	2000	Andrzej Bartkowiak	Jet Li (Han Sing); Aaliyah (Trish O'Day); Isaiah Washington (Mac); Russell Wong (Kai); DMX (Silk)	
Loving Hurts You (Spanish: Amar te duele)	Film	(Mexico)	2002	Fernando Sariñana	Luis Fernando Peña (Ulises); Martha Higareda (Renata); Ximena Sariñana (Mariana); Andrea Damian (La Güera); Alfonso Herrera (Francisco)	
Bollywood Queen	Film	(United Kingdom)	2003	Jeremy Wooding	Preeya Kalidas (Geena); James McAvoy (Jay); Ray Panthaki (Anil); Ciarán McMenamin (Dean); Kat Bhathena (Anjali); Ian McShane (Frank)	
Romeo and Juliet Get Married (Portuguese: O Casamento de Romeu e Julieta)	Film	(Brazil)	2005	Bruno Barreto	Luis Gustavo (Alfredo Baragatti); Luana Piovani (Julieta Baragatti); Marco Ricca (Romeu); Martha Mellinger (Isabela Baragatti); Berta Zemel (Nenzica); Leonardo Miggiorin (Zilinho)	
Romeo and Juliet (French: Roméo et Juliette)	Film	(Canada)	2006	Yves Desgagnés	Jeanne Moreau (Laurence); Thomas Lalonde (Roméo Lamontagne); Charlotte Aubin (Juliette Véronneau); Pierre Curzi (Paul Véronneau); Liliana Komorowska (Mère de Juliette)	
Romeo & Juliet: Sealed with a Kiss	Animation	(United States)	2006	Phil Nibbelink	Daniel Trippett (Romeo); Patricia Trippett (Juliet); Chip Albers (Mercutio); Michael Toland (Capulet); Stephen Goldberg (Montague); Phil Nibbelink (Prince); Sam Gold (Benvolio)	An animated adaptation featuring seals and other marine life.
Rome & Jewel	Film	(United States)	2006	Charles T. Kanganis; Neil Bagg	Nate Parker (Rome); Lindsey Haun (Jewel); Allen Maldonado (Mercury)	A hip-hop musical adaptation set in Los Angeles that deals with interracial love.
Romeo × Juliet (Japanese: ロミオ×ジュリエット, romanized: Romio to Jurietto)	Anime	(Japan)	2007	Fumitoshi Oizaki		
Romeo and Juliet (Japanese: ロミオとジュリエット)	TV	(Japan)	2007		Takizawa Hideaki (Morita Hiromichi); Nagasawa Masami (Kihira Juri); Tanaka Misako (Morita Tokieda); Yamashita Shinji (Kihira Reizou); Miura Tomokazu (Morita Giichi)	
Romeo and Juliet (Spanish: Romeo y Julieta)	TV	(Argentina)	2007	Raúl Lecouna	Elías Viñoles (Romeo Montero); Brenda Gandini (Julieta Caporale); Magalí Moro (Isabel Campos de Caporale); César Vianco (Vittorio Caporale); Benjamín Amadeo (Leo Caporale)	
David & Fatima	Film	(United States)	2008	Alain Zaloum	Cameron Van Hoy (David Isaac); Danielle Pollack (Fatima Aziz); Martin Landau (Rabbi Schmulic); Yareli Arizmendi (Aiida Aziz); Tony Curtis (Mr. Schwartz); Ben Kermode (Avi Weinstein)	
Another History (Telugu: మరో చరిత్ర, romanized: Maro Charitra)	Film	(India)	2010	Ravi Yadav	Varun Sandesh (Balu); Anitha Galler (Swapna); Shraddha Das (Sandhya)	
Gnomeo & Juliet	Animated film	(United Kingdom); (United States)	2011	Kelly Asbury	James McAvoy (Gnomeo); Emily Blunt (Juliet); Michael Caine (Lord Redbrick); Maggie Smith (Lady Bluebury); Jason Statham (Tybalt); Patrick Stewart (statue of Shakespeare); Ozzy Osbourne (Fawn); Hulk Hogan (Terrafirminator Announcer); Dolly Parton (Dolly Gnome)	An animated adaptation set in the gardens of two feuding elderly neighbors in modern-day Stratford-upon-Avon. The story features garden gnomes representing the characters from the original story, with red gnomes representing the Capulet family, and blue gnomes representing the Montague family. The film differs from the original story in many ways, notably keeping both Gnomeo and Juliet alive at the end of the film.
Private Romeo	Film	(United States)	2011	Alan Brown	Seth Numrich (Sam Singleton); Matt Doyle (Glenn Mangan); Hale Appleman (Josh Neff); Charlie Barnett (Ken Lee)	
Romeo & Juliet	Film	(United Kingdom); (Italy); (United States)	2013	Carlo Carlei	Douglas Booth (Romeo Montague); Hailee Steinfeld (Juliet Capulet); Damian Lewis (Lord Capulet); Paul Giamatti (Friar Lawrence); Lesley Manville (Nurse); Christian Cooke (Mercutio); Stellan Skarsgård (Prince Escalus)	
Issaq (Hindi: इसक)	Film	(India)	2013	Manish Tiwary	Prateik Babbar (Rahul Mishra); Amyra Dastur (Bachchi Kashyap); Ravi Kishan (Teeta Singh); Makarand Deshpande (Baba); Neena Gupta (Amma); Amit Sial (Murari)	
Goliyon Ki Raasleela Ram-Leela (Hindi: गोलियों की रासलीला रामलीला, lit. 'A Play of Bullets Ram-Leela)'	Film	(India)	2013	Sanjay Leela Bhansali	Ranveer Singh (Ram Rajadi); Deepika Padukone (Leela Sanera); Supriya Pathak (Dhankor Sanera); Sharad Kelkar (Kanji); Abhimanyu Singh (Meghji); Raza Murad (Sarpanch); Jameel Khan (Vanka)	
Arshinagar (Bengali: আরশিনগর)	Film	(India)	2015	Aparna Sen	Dev (Ranajit Mitra); Rittika Sen (Julekha Khan); Jisshu Sengupta (Tayyab); Roopa Ganguly (Tayyab's Mother); Waheeda Rehman (Dadijaan Ji); Kamaleshwar Mukherjee (Khan Sahab); Kaushik Sen (Sabir Khan)	
West Side Story	Film	(United States)	2021	Steven Spielberg	Rachel Zegler (Maria); Ansel Elgort (Tony); Mike Faist (Riff); Ariana DeBose (Anita); David Alvarez (Bernardo); Corey Stoll (Lieutenant Schrank); Brian d'Arcy James (Police Sergeant Krupke); Rita Moreno (Valentina)	A remake of Robert Wise and Jerome Robbins' 1961 adaptation of Leonard Bernstein and Stephen Sondheim's Broadway musical of the same name, itself based on Romeo and Juliet.

=== Timon of Athens ===
Title	M	C	Y	Directors	Starring	Description
Timon	Film	(Socialist Federal Republic of Yugoslavia)	1973	Tomislav Radić	Boris Buzančić; Vanja Drach; Kruno Valentic; Zlatko Crnković; Sasa Violic	
"Timon of Athens" (BBC Television Shakespeare)	TV	(United Kingdom)	1981	Jonathan Miller	Jonathan Pryce (Timon); Norman Rodway (Apemantus)	Released in the US as part of the Complete Dramatic Works of William Shakespeare series.

=== Titus Andronicus ===
Title	M	C	Y	Directors	Starring	Description
"Titus Andronicus" (BBC Television Shakespeare)	TV	(United Kingdom)	1985	Jane Howell	Paul Davies Prowles (Young Lucius); Edward Hardwicke (Marcus); Walter Brown (Aemilius); Brian Protheroe (Saturninus); Nicholas Gecks (Bassianus)	Released in the US as part of the Complete Dramatic Works of William Shakespeare series.
Titus	Film	(Italy); (United Kingdom); (United States)	1999	Julie Taymor	Anthony Hopkins (Titus Andronicus); Jessica Lange (Tamora); Alan Cumming (Saturninus); Colm Feore (Marcus Andronicus); James Frain (Bassianus); Laura Fraser (Lavinia); Harry Lennix (Aaron); Angus Macfadyen (Lucius); Matthew Rhys (Demetrius); Jonathan Rhys Meyers (Chiron)	
The Hungry	Film	India	2017	Bornila Chatterjee	Naseeruddin Shah (Tathagat Ahuja) · Tisca Chopra (Tulsi Joshi) · Antonio Aakeel (Chirag Joshi) · Neeraj Kabi (Arun Kumar) · Sayani Gupta (Loveleen Ahuja) · Arjun Gupta (Sunny Ahuja) · Suraj Sharma (Ankur Joshi) · Jayant Kripalani (Poddaar)	Set in contemporary New Delhi. Filmed by London-based cinematographer Nick Cooke.

=== Troilus and Cressida ===
Title	M	C	Y	Directors	Starring	Description
The Face of Love	TV	(United Kingdom)	1954	Alvin Rakoff	Laurence Payne (Troilus); Mary Morris (Cressida); Peter Cushing (Mardian Thersites); Ronald Lewis (Diomedes)	A modern-language and modern-dress adaptation of the play.
"Troilus & Cressida" (BBC Television Shakespeare)	TV	(United Kingdom)	1981	Jonathan Miller	Charles Gray (Pandarus); Anton Lesser (Troilus); Tony Steedman (Aeneas); Suzanne Burden (Cressida); Max Harvey (Alexander)	Released in the US as part of the Complete Dramatic Works of William Shakespeare series.

== Histories ==
=== Henry IV, Part 1 ===
Title	M	C	Y	Directors	Starring	Description
"Henry IV: Rebellion from the North" (An Age of Kings)	TV	(United Kingdom)	1960	Michael Hayes	Tom Fleming (Henry IV); Robert Hardy (Hal); Frank Pettingell (Falstaff); Sean Connery (Hotspur)	Covers 1 Henry IV Acts 1 and 2 (up to Prince Hal expressing his disdain for the war).
"Henry IV: The Road to Shrewsbury" (An Age of Kings)	TV	(United Kingdom)	1960	Michael Hayes	Tom Fleming (Henry IV); Robert Hardy (Hal); Frank Pettingell (Falstaff); Sean Connery (Hotspur)	Covers 1 Henry IV from Act 3, Scene 1 onwards (beginning with the strategy meeting between Hotspur, Mortimer and Glendower).
Chimes at Midnight	Film	(Switzerland); (Spain)	1966	Orson Welles	Orson Welles (Falstaff); Ralph Richardson (Narrator); Keith Baxter (Hal); John Gielgud (Henry IV)	An amalgamation of scenes from Richard II, Henry IV part 1, Henry IV Part 2, Henry V and The Merry Wives of Windsor.
"The First Part of King Henry the Fourth, with the life and death of Henry surnamed Hotspur" (BBC Television Shakespeare)	TV	(United Kingdom)	1979	David Giles	Anthony Quayle (Falstaff); Jon Finch (Henry IV); David Gwillim (Hal); Tim Pigott-Smith (Hotspur)	Released in the US as part of the Complete Dramatic Works of William Shakespeare series.
"Henry IV Part 1" (The War of the Roses)	Direct-to-video	(United Kingdom)	1990	Michael Bogdanov; Michael Pennington	Michael Pennington (Hal); Michael Cronin (King Henry IV); Andrew Jarvis (Hotspur); Barry Stanton (Falstaff); June Watson (Mistress Quickly); Philip Bowen (Worcester); Roger Booth (Northumberland); Charles Dale (Poins); Colin Farrell (Bardolph)	A direct filming of the stage performance of Michael Bogdanov and Michael Pennington's 7-play sequence for the English Shakespeare Company based on Shakespeare's history plays.
My Own Private Idaho	Film	(United States)	1991	Gus Van Sant	River Phoenix (Mike Waters); Keanu Reeves (Scott Favor)	Loosely based on Henry IV, Part 1, with elements from the other plays.
"Henry IV, Part 1" (The Hollow Crown)	TV	(United Kingdom)	2012	Richard Eyre	Jeremy Irons (Henry IV); Tom Hiddleston (Hal); Simon Russell Beale (Falstaff); Joe Armstrong (Hotspur)	

=== Henry IV, Part 2 ===
Title	M	C	Y	Directors	Starring	Description
"Henry IV: The New Conspiracy" (An Age of Kings)	TV	(United Kingdom)	1960	Michael Hayes	Tom Fleming (Henry IV); Robert Hardy (Hal); Frank Pettingell (Falstaff)	
"Henry IV: Uneasy Lies the Head" (An Age of Kings)	TV	(United Kingdom)	1960	Michael Hayes	Tom Fleming (Henry IV); Robert Hardy (Hal); Frank Pettingell (Falstaff)	
Chimes at Midnight	Film	(Switzerland); (Spain)	1966	Orson Welles	Orson Welles (Falstaff); Ralph Richardson (Narrator); Keith Baxter (Hal); John Gielgud (Henry IV)	An amalgamation of scenes from Richard II, Henry IV, Part 1, Henry IV, Part 2, Henry V and The Merry Wives of Windsor.
"The Second Part of King Henry the Fourth containing his Death: and the Coronation of King Henry the Fift" (BBC Television Shakespeare)	TV	(United Kingdom)	1979	David Giles	Anthony Quayle (Falstaff); Jon Finch (Henry IV); David Gwillim (Hal)	Released in the US as part of the Complete Dramatic Works of William Shakespeare series.
"Henry IV Part 2" (The War of the Roses)	Direct-to-video	(United Kingdom)	1990	Michael Bogdanov; Michael Pennington	Michael Pennington (Hal); Michael Cronin (King Henry IV); Barry Stanton (Falstaff); June Watson (Mistress Quickly); Philip Bowen (Worcester); Roger Booth (Northumberland); Charles Dale (Poins); Colin Farrell (Bardolph)	A direct filming of the stage performance of Bogdanov and Pennington's 7-play sequence for the English Shakespeare Company based on Shakespeare's history plays.
"Henry IV, Part 2" (The Hollow Crown)	TV	(United Kingdom)	2012	Richard Eyre	Jeremy Irons (Henry IV); Tom Hiddleston (Hal); Simon Russell Beale (Falstaff)	

=== Henry V ===
Title	M	C	Y	Directors	Starring	Description
Henry V	Film	(United Kingdom)	1944	Laurence Olivier	Laurence Olivier (Henry V); Renée Asherson (Katherine); Robert Newton (Pistol); Leslie Banks (Chorus)	
"Henry V: Signs of War" (An Age of Kings)	TV	(United Kingdom)	1960	Michael Hayes	William Squire (Chorus); Robert Hardy (Henry V); George A. Cooper (Pistol); Angela Baddeley (Mistress Quickly); John Warner (The Dauphin); Judi Dench (Katherine); Kenneth Farrington (Fluellen)	Henry V Acts 1, 2 and 3 (up to the French yearning for what they feel will be an easy victory at Agincourt).
"Henry V: The Band of Brothers" (An Age of Kings)	TV	(United Kingdom)	1960	Michael Hayes	William Squire (Chorus); Robert Hardy (Henry V); George A. Cooper (Pistol); Angela Baddeley (Mistress Quickly); John Warner (The Dauphin); Judi Dench (Katherine); Kenneth Farrington (Fluellen)	Henry V from Act 4, Scene 0 onwards (beginning with the Chorus describing Henry's undercover surveillance of his camp).
Chimes at Midnight	Film	(Switzerland); (Spain)	1966	Orson Welles	Orson Welles (Falstaff); Keith Baxter (Hal); John Gielgud (Henry IV)	An amalgamation of scenes from Richard II, Henry IV part 1, Henry IV part 2, Henry V and The Merry Wives of Windsor.
"The Life of Henry the Fift" (BBC Television Shakespeare)	TV	(United Kingdom)	1979	David Giles	Alec McCowen (Chorus); David Gwillim (Henry V); David Buck (Westmoreland); Tim Wylton (Fluellen); Bryan Pringle (Pistol); Jocelyne Boisseau (Katherine)	Released in the US as part of the Complete Dramatic Works of William Shakespeare series.
Henry V	Film	(United Kingdom)	1989	Kenneth Branagh	Kenneth Branagh (Henry V); Derek Jacobi (Chorus); Emma Thompson (Katherine); Judi Dench (Mistress Quickly)	
"Henry V" (The War of the Roses)	Video	(United Kingdom)	1990	Michael Bogdanov; Michael Pennington	Michael Pennington (King Henry V); Barry Stanton (Chorus); Francesca Ryan (Katherine of France); Andrew Jarvis (Dauphin); Sion Probert (Fluellen); June Watson (Mistress Quickly); Philip Bowen (Montjoy); Paul Brennan (Pistol); Colin Farrell (Bardolph)	A direct filming of the stage performance of Bogdanov and Pennington's 7-play sequence for the English Shakespeare Company based on Shakespeare's history plays.
"Henry V" (The Hollow Crown)	TV	(United Kingdom)	2012	Thea Sharrock	Tom Hiddleston (Henry V); Julie Walters (Mistress Quickly); John Hurt (the Chorus); Paul Ritter (Pistol); Owen Teale (Captain Fluellen); Simon Russell Beale (Falstaff)	
"The King"	Film	(Australia); (United States)	2019	David Michôd	Timothée Chalamet (Henry V); Joel Edgerton (Falstaff); Sean Harris (William Gascoigne); Lily-Rose Depp (Catherine of Valois); Robert Pattinson (The Dauphin); Ben Mendelsohn (King Henry IV)	An adaptation of three plays in William Shakespeare's Henriad – Henry IV, Part 1; Henry IV, Part 2 and Henry V, including the Battle of Agincourt.

=== Henry VI, Part 1 ===
Title	M	C	Y	Directors	Starring	Description
"Henry VI: The Red Rose and the White" (An Age of Kings)	TV	(United Kingdom)	1960	Michael Hayes	Patrick Garland (Duke of Bedford); John Ringham (Duke of Gloucester); Noel Johnson (Duke of Exeter); John Warner (Regnier); Eileen Atkins (Joan la Pucelle); Terry Scully (Henry VI)	
"Henry VI" (The Wars of the Roses)	TV	(United Kingdom)	1965	John Barton; Peter Hall	John Normington (Bedford); Paul Hardwick (Gloucester); Donald Burton (Exeter); David Warner (Henry VI); Charles Kay (The Dauphin); Janet Suzman (Joan la Pucelle); Peggy Ashcroft (Margaret)	Abridged versions of 1 Henry VI and 2 Henry VI up to Act 3, Scene 2 (Winchester's death).
"The First Part of Henry the Sixt" (BBC Television Shakespeare)	TV	(United Kingdom)	1983	Jane Howell	Peter Benson (Henry VI); Brenda Blethyn (Joan La Pucelle); David Burke (Gloucester); Michael Byrne (Duke of Alençon); David Daker (Anjou)	Released in the US as part of the Complete Dramatic Works of William Shakespeare series.
"Henry VI – House of Lancaster" (The War of the Roses)	Video	(United Kingdom)	1990	Michael Bogdanov; Michael Pennington	Paul Brennan (King Henry VI); Andrew Jarvis (Charles the Dauphin); Francesca Ryan (Joan la Pucelle); Barry Stanton (Duke of York); June Watson (Queen Margaret); Michael Pennington (Duke of Suffolk); Colin Farrell (Duke of Gloucester); Sion Probert (Duke of Somerset)	A direct filming of the stage performance of Bogdanov and Pennington's 7-play sequence for the English Shakespeare Company based on Shakespeare's history plays. This play is formed from Part 1 and from the earlier scenes of Part 2.
"Henry VI, Part I" (The Hollow Crown)	TV	(United Kingdom)	2016	Dominic Cooke	Tom Sturridge (Henry VI); Hugh Bonneville (Gloucester); Adrian Dunbar (Richard of York)	

=== Henry VI, Part 2 ===
Title	M	C	Y	Directors	Starring	Description
"Henry VI: The Fall of a Protector" (An Age of Kings)	TV	(United Kingdom)	1960	Michael Hayes	Edgar Wreford (Suffolk); Terry Scully (Henry VI); Mary Morris (Margaret); John Ringham (Gloucester); Robert Lang (Cardinal Beaufort); Gordon Gostelow (Salisbury); Frank Windsor (Warwick)	2 Henry VI Acts 1, 2 and Act 3, Scene 1 (up to York's soliloquy regarding the fact that he now has troops at his disposal and his revelation of his plans to use Jack Cade to instigate a popular rebellion).
"Henry VI: The Rabble from Kent" (An Age of Kings)	TV	(United Kingdom)	1960	Michael Hayes	Edgar Wreford (Suffolk); Terry Scully (Henry VI); Mary Morris (Margaret); John Ringham (Gloucester); Robert Lang (Cardinal Beaufort); Gordon Gostelow (Salisbury); Frank Windsor (Warwick)	2 Henry VI from Act 3, Scene 2 onwards (beginning with the murder of the Duke of Gloucester).
"Henry VI" (The Wars of the Roses)	TV	(United Kingdom)	1965	John Barton; Peter Hall	David Warner (Henry VI); Donald Sinden (Plantagenet); Gareth Morgan (Bolingbroke); Charles Kay (The Dauphin); Donald Layne-Smith (Reignier); Peter Geddis (Alençon); Janet Suzman (Joan la Pucelle); Peggy Ashcroft (Margaret)	Abridged versions of 1 Henry VI and 2 Henry VI up to Act 3, Scene 2 (Winchester's death).
"Edward IV" (The Wars of the Roses)	TV	(United Kingdom)	1965	John Barton; Peter Hall	David Warner (Henry VI); Peggy Ashcroft (Margaret); Roy Dotrice (Edward IV]]); Ian Holm (Gloucester); Susan Engel (Elizabeth Grey); Roy Dotrice (Jack Cade); Peter Geddis (Alençon)	A newly written scene followed by 2 Henry VI from Act 4, Scene 1 (the introduction of Jack Cade) onwards, and an abridged version of 3 Henry VI.
"The Second Part of Henry the Sixt" (BBC Television Shakespeare)	TV	(United Kingdom)	1983	Jane Howell	Peter Benson (Henry VI); David Burke (Gloucester); Julia Foster (Queen Margaret); Trevor Peacock (Jack Cade); Brian Protheroe (Edward Plantagenet)	Released in the US as part of the Complete Dramatic Works of William Shakespeare series.
"Henry VI: House of Lancaster" (The War of the Roses)	Video	(United Kingdom)	1990	Michael Bogdanov; Michael Pennington	Paul Brennan (King Henry VI); Andrew Jarvis (Charles the Dauphin); Barry Stanton (Duke of York); June Watson (Queen Margaret); Michael Pennington (Duke of Suffolk); Sion Probert (Duke of Somerset)	A direct filming of the stage performance of Bogdanov and Pennington's 7-play sequence for the English Shakespeare Company based on Shakespeare's history plays. This play is formed from Part 1 and the early scenes of Part 2.
"Henry VI: House of York" (The War of the Roses)	Video	(United Kingdom)	1990	Michael Bogdanov; Michael Pennington	Paul Brennan (King Henry VI); Andrew Jarvis (Richard, Duke of Gloucester); Barry Stanton (Duke of York); June Watson (Queen Margaret); Michael Pennington (Jack Cade); John Dougall (George, Duke of Clarence); Sion Probert (Duke of Somerset)	A direct filming of the stage performance of Bogdanov and Pennington's 7-play sequence for the English Shakespeare Company based on Shakespeare's history plays. This play is formed from the remaining scenes of Part 2 and Part 3
"Henry VI, Part II" (The Hollow Crown)	TV	(United Kingdom)	2016	Dominic Cooke	Tom Sturridge (Henry VI); Benedict Cumberbatch (Richard Plantagenet); Keeley Hawes (Queen Elizabeth)	Made up of scenes from Henry VI, Part 2 and an abridged version of Henry VI, Part 3.

=== Henry VI, Part 3 ===
Title	M	C	Y	Directors	Starring	Description
"Henry VI: The Morning's War" (An Age of Kings)	TV	(United Kingdom)	1960	Michael Hayes	Terry Scully (Henry VI); Julian Glover (Edward IV); Paul Daneman (Gloucester); Mary Morris (Margaret); Jane Wenham (Elizabeth Grey); Leon Shepperdson (Westmoreland); Jack May (York)	Henry VI, Part 3 Acts 1, 2 and Act 3, Scenes 1 and 2 (up to Richard's soliloquy wherein he vows to attain the crown).
"Henry VI: The Sun in Splendour" (An Age of Kings)	TV	(United Kingdom)	1960	Michael Hayes	Terry Scully (Henry VI); Julian Glover (Edward IV); Gareth Tandy (Richmond); John Warner (Lewis XI); Mary Morris (Margaret); Jane Wenham (Elizabeth); Paul Daneman (Gloucester)	Henry VI, Part 3 from Act 3, Scene 3 onwards (beginning with Margaret's visit to Louis XI of France).
"Edward IV" (The Wars of the Roses)	TV	(United Kingdom)	1965	John Barton; Peter Hall	David Warner (Henry VI); Peggy Ashcroft (Margaret); Roy Dotrice (Edward IV); Ian Holm (Gloucester); Susan Engel (Elizabeth Grey); Roy Dotrice (Jack Cade); Peter Geddis (Alençon)	A newly written scene followed by 2 Henry VI from Act 4, Scene 1 (the introduction of Jack Cade) onwards, and an abridged version of 3 Henry VI.
"The Third Part of Henry the Sixt" (BBC Television Shakespeare)	TV	(United Kingdom)	1983	Jane Howell	Peter Benson (Henry VI); Ron Cook (Gloucester); Rowena Cooper (Elizabeth Grey); Julia Foster (Margaret); Brian Protheroe (Edward IV); Tim Fuke (the Young Richmond); Antony Brown (Louis XI)	Released in the US as part of the Complete Dramatic Works of William Shakespeare series.
"Henry VI: House of York" (The War of the Roses)	Video	(United Kingdom)	1990	Michael Bogdanov; Michael Pennington	Paul Brennan (King Henry VI); Andrew Jarvis (Richard, Duke of Gloucester); Barry Stanton (Duke of York); June Watson (Queen Margaret); Michael Pennington (Jack Cade); John Dougall (George, Duke of Clarence); Sion Probert (Duke of Somerset)	A direct filming of the stage performance of Bogdanov and Pennington's 7-play sequence for the English Shakespeare Company based on Shakespeare's history plays. This play is formed from the later scenes of Part 2 and from Part 3.
"Henry VI, Part II" (The Hollow Crown)	TV	(United Kingdom)	2016	Dominic Cooke	Tom Sturridge (Henry VI); Benedict Cumberbatch (Richard Plantagenet); Keeley Hawes (Queen Elizabeth)	Made up of scenes from Part 2 and an abridged version of Part 3.

=== Henry VIII ===
Title	M	C	Y	Directors	Starring	Description
Henry VIII	Silent film	(United Kingdom)	1911	Will Barker	Arthur Bourchier (Henry VIII); Herbert Tree (Cardinal Wolsey); Violet Vanbrugh (Queen Katharine); Laura Cowie (Anne Boleyn); S. A. Cookson (Cardinal Campeius); Charles Fuller (Cranmer); A.E. George (Duke of Norfolk)	
"The Famous History of the Life of King Henry the Eight" (BBC Television Shakespeare)	TV	(United Kingdom)	1979	Kevin Billington	Tony Church (Prologue); John Stride (Henry VIII); Julian Glover (Buckingham); John Rowe (Cromwell); Claire Bloom (Katharine of Aragon); Barbara Kellerman (Anne Bullen)	Released in the US as part of the Complete Dramatic Works of William Shakespeare series.

=== King John ===
Title	M	C	Y	Directors	Starring	Description
King John	Silent film	(United Kingdom)	1899	William Kennedy Dickson; Walter Pfeffer Dando	Herbert Beerbohm Tree (King John); Dora Senior (Prince Henry); Charles Sefton (Prince Arthur); James Fisher (Pembroke); S. A. Cookson (Salisbury); Franklyn McLeay (Hubert); Lewis Waller (Faulconbridge); Julia Neilson (Constance)	The earliest known film based on a play by Shakespeare. It consists of four scenes and is based on Herbert Beerbohm Tree's contemporary stage production, and was made to promote the stage version.
Said-e-Havas (Hindi: सैदे-हवस, lit. 'Prey to Desire)'	Film	(India)	1936	Sohrab Modi	Sohrab Modi (Kazal Beg); Gulzar Bai; Sadat Ali; Shama	Produced by Modi's Stage Film Company, the film was a "stage recording" of the play, similar to Modi's first stage adaptation to screen of Khoon Ka Khoon. It was written by Agha Hashr, based on an adaptation of King John and Richard III. The film incorporates scenes and acts from King John, mainly Act 2 Scene 5, and made use of Richard III as general reference. Modi played the role of the "ethnically black" Kazal Beg (Hubert). Hashr had written the play in 1907 and according to Rajiva Verma there is very little similarity between King John and Hashr's adaptation, except for those mentioned earlier.
"The Life and Death of King John" (BBC Television Shakespeare)	TV	(United Kingdom)	1984	David Giles	Leonard Rossiter (King John); Mary Morris (Queen Elinor); Charles Kay (Philip of France); Jonathan Coy (the Dauphin); Rusty Livingstone (Prince Henry)	Released in the US as part of the Complete Dramatic Works of William Shakespeare series.
"King John" (CBC Presents the Stratford Festival)	Video	(Canada)	2015	Barry Avrich	Tom McCamus (King John); Patricia Collins (Queen Eleanor); Andrew Lawrie (Prince Henry); Jennifer Mogbock (Blanche of Spain); Brad Rudy (Pembroke); Stephen Russell (Salisbury)	Filmed version of the Stratford Festival's 2014 stage production.

=== Richard II ===
Title	M	C	Y	Directors	Starring	Description
"Richard II: The Hollow Crown" (An Age of Kings)	TV	(United Kingdom)	1960	Michael Hayes	David William (King Richard the Second); Edgar Wreford (John of Gaunt); Tom Fleming (Henry Bolingbroke); Juliet Cooke (Queen); Sean Connery (Harry Percy)	Richard II Acts 1, 2 and 3, Scenes 1 and 2 (up to Richard conceding defeat despite the protests of Carlisle, Scroop and Aumerle).
"Richard II: The Deposing of a King" (An Age of Kings)	TV	(United Kingdom)	1960	Michael Hayes	David William (King Richard the Second); Edgar Wreford (John of Gaunt); Tom Fleming (Henry Bolingbroke); Juliet Cooke (Queen); Sean Connery (Harry Percy)	Richard II from Act 3, Scene 3 onwards (beginning with York chiding Northumberland for not referring to Richard as "King").
The Life and Death of King Richard II	TV	(Australia)	1960	Raymond Menmuir	Ric Hutton (Richard II); Richard Parry (John of Gaunt); James Condon (Bolingbroke); Malcolm Billings (Aumerle); Nancye Stewart (Duchess of Gloucester)	A live TV production that aired on 5 October 1960 and was one of the most elaborate productions made for Australian TV at that time. The ABC decided to suspend peak-hour programs to transmit the show live using all three of the ABC's Gore Hill TV studios. An obituary of Menmuir called this "a concept of such complexity and audacity that it was never repeated."
Chimes at Midnight	Film	(Switzerland); (Spain)	1966	Orson Welles	Orson Welles (Falstaff); Keith Baxter (Hal); John Gielgud (Henry IV)	An amalgamation of scenes from Richard II, Henry IV, Part 1, Henry IV, Part 2, Henry V and The Merry Wives of Windsor.
"King Richard the Second" (BBC Television Shakespeare)	TV	(United Kingdom)	1978	David Giles	Derek Jacobi (King Richard); John Gielgud (John of Gaunt); Jon Finch (Henry Bolingbroke); Janet Maw (Queen); Jeremy Bulloch (Henry Percy)	Released in the US as part of the Complete Dramatic Works of William Shakespeare series.
Richard II (The War of the Roses)	Video	(United Kingdom)	1990	Michael Bogdanov; Michael Pennington	Michael Pennington (King Richard II); Andrew Jarvis (Hotspur); Michael Cronin (Henry Bolingbroke); Francesca Ryan (Queen Isabel); Clyde Pollitt (John of Gaunt); Colin Farrell (Duke of York); Sion Probert (Sir John Bushy)	A direct filming of the stage performance of Bogdanov and Pennington's 7-play sequence for the English Shakespeare Company based on Shakespeare's history plays.
Richard II	TV	(United Kingdom)	1997	Deborah Warner	Fiona Shaw (Richard II); Richard Bremner (Bolingbroke); Graham Crowden (John of Gaunt); Kevin McKidd (Hotspur)	
Richard the Second	Video	(United States)	2001	John Farrell	Matte Osian (Richard)	
Richard II (The Hollow Crown)	TV	(United Kingdom)	2012	Rupert Goold	Ben Whishaw (Richard II); Rory Kinnear (Bolingbroke); Patrick Stewart (John of Gaunt)	

=== Richard III ===
Title	M	C	Y	Directors	Starring	Description
Richard III	Film	(United Kingdom)	1911	Frank R. Benson	Alfred Brydone (Edward IV); Frank R. Benson (Richard III)	The only surviving film of Frank R. Benson’s legendary Shakespeare productions, for which he received a knighthood from King George. A literal recording of Richard III on stage.
Richard III	Film	(United States); (France)	1912	André Calmettes; James Keane	Robert Gemp (Edward IV); Frederick Warde (Gloucester); Albert Gardner (Prince Edward); James Keane (Richmond); George Moss (Tressel); Howard Stuart (Edward); Virginia Rankin (York); Violet Stuart (Lady Anne Plantagenet); Carey Lee (Queen Elizabeth); Carlotta De Felice (Princess Elizabeth)	The oldest surviving American feature-length film, which is also thought to be the first feature-length Shakespearean adaptation ever made.
Tower of London	Film	(United States)	1939	Rowland V. Lee	Basil Rathbone (Richard); Vincent Price (Clarence); Rose Hobart (Lady Anne)	
Richard III	Film	(United Kingdom)	1955	Laurence Olivier	Laurence Olivier (Richard); John Gielgud (Clarence); Ralph Richardson (Buckingham); Claire Bloom (Lady Anne)	
"Richard III: The Dangerous Brother" (An Age of Kings)	TV	(United Kingdom)	1960	Michael Hayes	Julian Glover (Edward IV); Paul Daneman (Richard III); Jerome Willis (Richmond)	Richard III Acts 1, 2 and Act 3, Scene 1 (up to Richard promising Buckingham the Dukedom of Hereford).
"Richard III: The Boar Hunt" (An Age of Kings)	TV	(United Kingdom)	1960	Michael Hayes	Julian Glover (Edward IV); Paul Daneman (Richard III); Jerome Willis (Richmond)	Richard III from Act 3, Scene 1 onwards (beginning with Stanley's messenger arriving at Hasting's house).
Tower of London	Film	(United States)	1962	Roger Corman	Vincent Price (Richard); Charles Macaulay (Clarence); Bruce Gordon (Buckingham); Joan Camden (Lady Anne)	
Richard III (The Wars of the Roses)	TV	(United Kingdom)	1965	John Barton; Peter Hall	Roy Dotrice (Edward IV); Susan Engel (Queen Elizabeth); Fergus McClelland (Prince Edward); Ian Holm (Gloucester); David Warner (Henry VI); Peggy Ashcroft (Margaret); Alan Tucker (Prince Edward); Eric Porter (Richmond)	An abridged version of Richard III.
The Goodbye Girl	Film	(United States)	1977	Herbert Ross	Richard Dreyfuss (Elliot Garfield); Marsha Mason (Paula McFadden); Quinn Cummings (Lucy McFadden); Paul Benedict (Mark); Barbara Rhoades (Donna); Theresa Merritt (Mrs. Crosby); Michael Shawn (Ronnie)	Contains scenes in which the Richard Dreyfuss character rehearses and performs Shakespeare's play.
"The Tragedy of Richard III" (BBC Television Shakespeare)	TV	(United Kingdom)	1983	Jane Howell	Peter Benson (Henry VI); Ron Cook (Richard III); Rowena Cooper (Queen Elizabeth); Dorian Ford (Edward, Prince of Wales); Julia Foster (Queen Margaret); Zoë Wanamaker (Lady Anne)	Released in the US as part of the Complete Dramatic Works of William Shakespeare series.
The Black Adder	TV	(United Kingdom)	1983	Martin Shardlow	Rowan Atkinson (Edmund Blackadder); Brian Blessed (Richard IV); Elspet Gray (Gertrude, Queen of Flanders); Robert East (Harry, Prince of Wales); Tony Robinson (Baldrick)	The first series, written by Atkinson and Richard Curtis, is a parody of Shakespeare's plays, particularly Macbeth, Richard III and Henry V.
Richard III (The War of the Roses)	Video	(United Kingdom)	1990	Michael Bogdanov; Michael Pennington	Andrew Jarvis (King Richard III); Michael Pennington (Duke of Buckingham); Michael Cronin (Lord Stanley); Philip Bowen (King Edward IV); John Dougall (Earl of Clarence); Francesca Ryan (Lady Anne); Ann Penfold (Queen Elizabeth); June Watson (Queen Margaret); Charles Dale (Earl of Richmond); Sion Probert (Catesby)	A direct filming of the stage performance of Bogdanov and Pennington's 7-play sequence for the English Shakespeare Company based on Shakespeare's history plays.
"King Richard III" (Shakespeare: The Animated Tales)	TV	(Russia); (United Kingdom)	1994	Natalia Orlova	Alec McCowen (Narrator); Antony Sher (Richard); James Grout (Catesby); Sorcha Cusack (Queen Elizabeth); Suzanne Burden (Anne); Eleanor Bron (Duchess of York); Tom Wilkinson (Buckingham)	Paint-on-glass animation
Richard III	Film	(United Kingdom)	1995	Richard Loncraine	Ian McKellen (Richard); Annette Bening (Elizabeth); Nigel Hawthorne (Clarence); Kristin Scott Thomas (Lady Anne); Maggie Smith (Duchess of York)	The film sets the play in 1930s Britain with Richard as a fascist sympathizer plotting to usurp the throne.
Looking for Richard	Film	(United States)	1996	Al Pacino	Al Pacino (Richard III); Harris Yulin (King Edward); Kevin Spacey (Buckingham); Winona Ryder (Lady Anne); Kevin Conway (Lord Hastings); Estelle Parsons (Queen Margaret); Alec Baldwin (Clarence); Aidan Quinn (Richmond)	A documentary account of Pacino's quest to perform Shakespeare's play, featuring substantial excerpts.
King Rikki (The Street King)	Film	USA	2002	James Gavin Bedford	Jon Seda · Mario López · Tonantzin Carmelo · Timothy Paul Perrez	
Richard III	Film	(United States)	2008	Scott M. Anderson	Scott M. Anderson (Richard III); David Carradine (Buckingham); María Conchita Alonso (Queen Elizabeth); Sally Kirkland (Queen Margaret); Anne Jeffreys (Duchess of York); Sung Hi Lee (Anne Neville); TQ (DJ)	
"Richard III" (The Hollow Crown)	TV	(United Kingdom)	2016	Dominic Cooke	Benedict Cumberbatch (Richard Plantagenet); Keeley Hawes (Queen Elizabeth); Judi Dench (Cecily, Duchess of York)	
The Lost King	Film	(United Kingdom)	2022	Stephen Frears	Sally Hawkins (Philippa Langley); Steve Coogan; Harry Lloyd (Richard III); Mark Addy; Lee Ingleby; James Fleet	After attending the play, Philippa follows her hunch of where she believes the lost King Richard III is buried.

== Romances ==
=== Pericles ===
Title	M	C	Y	Directors	Starring	Description
"Pericles, Prince of Tyre" (BBC Television Shakespeare)	TV	(United Kingdom)	1984	David Jones	Edward Petherbridge (Gower); John Woodvine (King Antiochus); Edita Brychta (Antiochus' Daughter); Mike Gwilym (Pericles); John Bardon (Lord of Tyre)	Released in the US as part of the Complete Dramatic Works of William Shakespeare series.

=== Cymbeline ===
Title	M	C	Y	Directors	Starring	Description
Cymbeline	Silent	(United States)	1913	Lucius Henderson	William Russell (Cymbeline); Florence La Badie (Imogen)	
"Cymbeline" (BBC Television Shakespeare)	TV	(United Kingdom)	1982	Elijah Moshinsky	Richard Johnson (Cymbeline); Helen Mirren (Imogen)	Released in the US as part of the Complete Dramatic Works of William Shakespeare series.
Cymbeline	Film	(United States)	2014	Michael Almereyda	Ethan Hawke (Iachimo); Ed Harris (Cymbeline); Milla Jovovich (The Queen); John Leguizamo (Pisanio); Dakota Johnson (Imogen)	

=== The Winter's Tale ===
Title	M	C	Y	Directors	Starring	Description
The Winter's Tale	Silent	(United States)	1910	(unknown)	Anna Rosemond (the Queen of Sicilia); Martin Faust (King of Sicilia); Frank H. Crane (King of Bohemia); Amelia Barleon (Princess of Sicilia); Alfred Hanlon (Prince of Bohemia)	
"The Winter's Tale" (BBC Television Shakespeare)	TV	(United Kingdom)	1981	Jane Howell	John Welsh (Archidamus); David Burke (Camillo); Robert Stephens (Polixenes); Jeremy Kemp (Leontes); Anna Calder-Marshall (Hermione)	Released in the US as part of the Complete Dramatic Works of William Shakespeare series.
"The Winter's Tale" (Shakespeare: The Animated Tales)	TV	(Russia); (United Kingdom)	1994	Stanislav Sokolov	Roger Allam (Narrator); Anton Lesser (Leontes); Jenny Agutter (Hermione); Sally Dexter (Paulina); Michael Kitchen (Polixenes); Stephen Tompkinson (Autolycus); Timothy Bateson (Antigonus); Jonathan Firth (Florizel)	Stop motion puppet animation
The Winter's Tale	Video	(United Kingdom)	1999	Gregory Doran (stage); Robin Lough (TV)	Ken Bones (Polixenes); Emily Bruni (Perdita); Nancy Carroll (Lady in waiting); Geoffrey Freshwater (Camillo); Alexandra Gilbreath (Hermione)	A straight-to-video filming of the 1999 RSC Barbican production.

=== The Tempest ===
Title	M	C	Y	Directors	Starring	Description
The Tempest	Silent	(United States)	1911	Edwin Thanhouser	Ed Genung (Ferdinand); Florence La Badie (Miranda)	
Yellow Sky	Film	(United States)	1948	William A. Wellman	Gregory Peck (Stretch); Anne Baxter (Mike); Richard Widmark (Dude); Robert Arthur (Bull Run); John Russell (Lengthy); Harry Morgan (Half Pint); James Barton (Grandpa)	A western film where a band of reprobate outlaws flee after a bank robbery and encounter an old man and his granddaughter in a ghost town. The story is believed to be loosely adapted from The Tempest.
Forbidden Planet	Film	(United States)	1956	Fred M. Wilcox	Walter Pidgeon (Dr. Edward Morbius); Anne Francis (Altaira 'Alta' Morbius); Leslie Nielsen (Commander J. J. Adams)	A science fiction classic in which a starship crew meets the scientist Dr Morbius, his daughter Altaira, their custom-built robot Robby, and a mysterious, threatening force, all on the titular fourth planet of Altair. Each of these elements corresponds to the play's sailing vessel and its crew, the sorcerer Prospero, his daughter Miranda, Ariel the sprite, and the enchantments of the island.
"The Tempest" (Hallmark Hall of Fame)	TV	(United States)	1960	George Schaefer	Maurice Evans (Prospero); Richard Burton (Caliban); Lee Remick (Miranda); Roddy McDowall (Ariel)	
Planet of Evil (Doctor Who)	TV	(United Kingdom)	1975	David Maloney	Tom Baker (Fourth Doctor); Elisabeth Sladen (Sarah Jane Smith); Frederick Jaeger (Sorenson); Ewen Solon (Vishinsky); Prentis Hancock (Salamar); Louis Mahoney (Ponti); Michael Wisher (Morelli)	A loose adaptation of The Tempest based on the prior adaptation Forbidden Planet, in which the Fourth Doctor and Sarah Jane Smith meet the members of a geological expedition who are being menaced by a being made of antimatter on the planet Zeta Minor.
The Tempest	Film	(United Kingdom)	1979	Derek Jarman	Heathcote Williams (Prospero); Toyah Willcox (Miranda); Karl Johnson (Ariel); Jack Birkett (Caliban); Richard Warwick (Antonio); Peter Bull (Alonso); David Meyer (Ferdinand)	
"The Tempest" (BBC Television Shakespeare)	TV	(United Kingdom)	1980	John Gorrie	Michael Hordern (Prospero); Pippa Guard (Miranda); Warren Clarke (Caliban); David Dixon (Ariel); Christopher Guard (Ferdinand); Nigel Hawthorne (Stephano)	Released in the US as part of the Complete Dramatic Works of William Shakespeare series.
Tempest	Film	(United States)	1982	Paul Mazursky	John Cassavetes (Phillip Dimitrious); Molly Ringwald (Miranda); Susan Sarandon (Aretha); Raul Julia (Kalibanos); Gena Rowlands (Antonia)	
The Tempest (The Shakespeare Collection)	TV	(United States)	1983	William Woodman	Efrem Zimbalist Jr. (Prospero); J.E. Taylor (Miranda); William Hootkins (Caliban); Duane Black (Ariel); Nicholas Hammond (Ferdinand); Kay E. Kuter (Gonzalo); Ron Palillo (Trinculo)	
The Journey to Melonia (Swedish: Resan till Melonia)	Film	(Sweden); (Norway)	1989	Per Åhlin	Allan Edwall (Prospero); Robin Carlsson (Miranda); Ernst Günther (Caliban); Tomas von Brömssen (Ariel); Olle Sarri (Ferdinand)	
Prospero's Books	Film	(United Kingdom)	1991	Peter Greenaway	John Gielgud (Prospero); Isabelle Pasco (Miranda)	A partial adaptation.
"The Tempest" (Shakespeare: The Animated Tales)	TV	(Russia); (United Kingdom)	1992	Stanislav Sokolov	Timothy West (Prospero); Katy Behean (Miranda); Alun Armstrong (Caliban); Ella Mood (Ariel); Jonathan Tafler (Ferdinand); James Greene (Gonzalo)	Stop motion puppet animation
The Tempest	TV	(United States)	1998	Jack Bender	Peter Fonda (Gideon Prosper); John Glover (Anthony Prosper); Harold Perrineau (Ariel); Katherine Heigl (Miranda Prosper); John Pyper-Ferguson (Gator Man); Eddie Mills (Captain Frederick Allen); Dennis Redfield (Wilfried 'Willy' Gonzo)	
The Tempest	Film	(United States)	2010	Julie Taymor	Helen Mirren (Prospera); David Strathairn (King of Naples); Djimon Hounsou (Caliban); Russell Brand (Trinculo); Alfred Molina (Stephano); Ben Whishaw (Ariel); Felicity Jones (Miranda); Reeve Carney (Ferdinand); Chris Cooper (Antonio); Alan Cumming (Sebastian)	The gender of main character Prospero was changed to Prospera so Mirren could take the role.
The Tempest	Video	(Canada)	2010	Des McAnuff	Christopher Plummer (Prospero); Trish Lindstrom (Miranda); Dion Johnstone (Caliban); Julyana Soelistyo (Ariel); Gareth Potter (Ferdinand); James Blendick (Gonzalo); Geraint Wyn Davies (Stephano)	A filmed Stratford Shakespeare Festival production.
The Tempest	Video	(United Kingdom)	2014	Jeremy Herrin	Colin Morgan (Ariel); Roger Allam (Prospero); Jason Baughan (Antonio); Jessie Buckley (Miranda); Sam Cox (Stephano); Trevor Fox (Trinculo); James Garnon (Caliban); Peter Hamilton Dyer (Alonso); Joshua James (Ferdinand)	A filmed version of the live production at Shakespeare's Globe Theatre in London, 2013.
La stoffa dei sogni (The Stuff of Dreams)	Film	(Italy) (France)	2016	Gianfranco Cabiddu	Sergio Rubini (Oreste Campesi); Ennio Fantastichini (direttore De Caro); Renato Carpentieri (Don Vincenzo); Alba Gaia Bellugi (Miranda); Francesco Di Leva (Andrea); Ciro Petrone (Saverio); Teresa Saponangelo (Maria); Luca De Filippo (captain); Nicola Di Pinto (Pasquale)	The story is adapted in 1950s Sardinia, next to a prison. Due to a storm, a Mafia boss, his son and two henchmen are stranded upon the island and pursued by the director of the prison. They force a company of actors to hide them amongst themselves, but the director, in order to unmask the imposters, orders them to perform Shakespeare's play in Neapolitan.
Shakespeare's Shitstorm	Film	(United States)	2020	Lloyd Kaufman	Amanda Flowers (Ariel); Lloyd Kaufman (Prospero / Antoinette Duke); Kate McGarrigle (Miranda); Zoë Geltman (Steph); Dylan Mars Greenberg (Trini); Monique Dupree (Caliban); Erin Patrick Miller (Ferdinand)	A more or less a faithful adaptation of the play except with the addition of extreme amounts of Troma-esque sexuality and violence.

== Other ==
=== Shakespeare as a character ===
Title	M	C	Y	Directors	Starring	Description
Shakespeare Writing Julius Caesar	Silent		1907			The probable first appearance of Shakespeare as a character.
Master Will Shakespeare	Film	(United States)	1936	Jacques Tourneur	Anthony Kemble-Cooper	Short film.
Time Flies	Film	(United Kingdom)	1944	Walter Forde	John Salew	Tommy meets Shakespeare in 16th century England.
The Story of Mankind	Film	(United States)	1957	Irwin Allen	Reginald Gardiner	Shakespeare appears in Heaven.
"The Bard" (The Twilight Zone)	TV	(United States)	1963	David Butler	John Williams	A bumbling screenwriter summons Shakespeare's ghost to become his ghostwriter.
"The Executioners" (Doctor Who - "The Chase")	TV	(United Kingdom)	1965	Richard Martin	Hugh Walters	An episode of the classic BBC science fiction series, first screened on 22 May 1965.
William Shakespeare: His Life & Times	TV	(United Kingdom)	1978	Mark Collingham; Robert Knights	Tim Curry (Shakespeare); Nicholas Clay (Earl of Southampton); Patience Collier (Queen Elizabeth I); Ian McShane (Christopher Marlowe)	A 6-part serial produced by Cecil Clarke and written by John Mortimer, that recounts Shakespeare's life in London.
"Act Break" (The Twilight Zone)	TV	(United States)	1985	Ted Flicker	Bob Dishy (William Shakespeare)	A struggling playwright accidentally goes back in time and meets Shakespeare.
Shakespeare in Love	Film	(United Kingdom)	1998	John Madden	Joseph Fiennes (Will Shakespeare); Gwyneth Paltrow (Viola De Lesseps); Colin Firth (Lord Wessex); Judi Dench (Queen Elizabeth I)	A fictional love story about Shakespeare's romance with a noblewoman, at the time of writing Romeo and Juliet. Won the Academy Award for Best Picture.
"Drew's In a Coma" (The Drew Carey Show)	TV	(United States)	2001	Gerry Cohen	Patrick Gorman (William Shakespeare)	Drew meets Shakespeare in Heaven.
Elizabeth Rex	TV	(Canada)	2004	Barbara Willis Sweete	Peter Hutt (William Shakespeare); Diane D'Aquila (Queen Elizabeth I); Brent Carver (Ned Lowenscroft); Bernard Hopkins (Lord Cecil)	Based on the play of that name by Timothy Findley, stars Shakespeare as a main character, recording interactions between Elizabeth I and members of his cast on the night her lover is to be executed by her own order.
A Waste of Shame	TV	(United Kingdom)	2005	John McKay	Rupert Graves (Shakespeare); Anna Chancellor (Anne Hathaway); Tom Sturridge (William Herbert); Indira Varma (Lucie); Andrew Tiernan (Ben Jonson)	A dramatisation of Shakespeare's life at the time of writing the Sonnets.
"The Shakespeare Code" (Doctor Who)	TV	(United Kingdom)	2007	Charles Palmer	Dean Lennox Kelly (William Shakespeare)	An episode of the BBC science fiction series, first screened on 7 April 2007, set in 1599.
Romeo x Juliet	TV	(Japan)	2007	Yukio Takahashi (4 episodes); Masanori Takahashi (3 episodes); Takaaki Wada (3 episodes); Michio Fukuda (2 episodes); Mitsuhiro Karato (2 episodes)	William Shakespeare voiced by Kazuhiko Inoue (Japanese) and J. Michael Tatum (English dub)	An anime fantasy retelling of the play. Juliet's family were rulers of a floating island nation called Neo Verona before being killed by the Montagues, forcing her to hide in a theater troupe owned by a fictional version of William Shakespeare.
Miguel y William	TV	(Spain)	2007	Inés Paris	Will Kemp (William Shakespeare); Juan Luis Galiardo (Miguel de Cervantes)	A romantic comedy depicting a fictional meeting between William Shakespeare and Miguel de Cervantes in the early seventeenth century and their rival love for a woman. The dialogue is a mixture of Spanish and English.
Anonymous	Film	(United Kingdom); (Germany)	2011	Roland Emmerich	Rafe Spall (William Shakespeare); Vanessa Redgrave (Queen Elizabeth I); Rhys Ifans (Edward De Vere, Earl of Oxford); David Thewlis (William Cecil); Sebastian Armesto (Ben Jonson); Trystan Gravelle (Christopher Marlowe); Joely Richardson (Young Queen Elizabeth I)	A fictional drama about the alleged authorship of Shakespeare's work.
The Lego Movie	Film	(United States)	2014	Phil Lord & Chris Miller	Jorma Taccone (William Shakespeare)	One of the many cameo characters
Bill	Film	(United Kingdom)	2015	Richard Bracewell	Mathew Baynton (William Shakespeare) Martha Howe-Douglas (Anne Hathaway) Helen McCrory (Queen Elizabeth I) Rufus Jones (Sir Walter Raleigh)	A family comedy focusing on the young adult Shakespeare's rise to fame. Many of the cast feature in the children's TV series Horrible Histories.
Upstart Crow	TV	(United Kingdom)	2016	Matt Lipsey	David Mitchell (William Shakespeare); Liza Tarbuck (Anne Hathaway); Steve Speirs (Richard Burbage); Spencer Jones (William Kempe); Tim Downie (Christopher Marlowe)	A BBC sitcom.
"Landmarks" (Drunk History)	TV	(United States)	2016	Jeremy Konner	John Cho (William Shakespeare); Anthony Edwards (Giles Allen)	A Comedy Central series where storytellers attempt to retell historical events after becoming intoxicated with alcohol. The episode "Landmarks" includes a segment where Mark Gagliardi retells how the Globe Theatre was "stolen" by Shakespeare, the Lord Chamberlain's Men, and Peter Street in 1598 from landlord Giles Allen.
Will	TV	(United States)	2017		Laurie Davidson (William Shakespeare); Jamie Campbell Bower (Christopher Marlowe); Mattias Inwood (Richard Burbage); Olivia DeJonge (Alice Burbage); Colm Meaney (James Burbage); James Berkery (Jeremy Nightstand)	A TNT series telling the wild story of young William Shakespeare's arrival onto the punk-rock theater scene in 16th century London - the seductive, violent world where his raw talent faced rioting audiences, religious fanatics and raucous side-shows; a contemporary version of Shakespeare's life, played to a modern soundtrack that exposes all his recklessness, lustful temptations and brilliance. It was cancelled after only one season.
All Is True	Film	(United Kingdom)	2018	Kenneth Branagh	Kenneth Branagh (William Shakespeare) Judi Dench (Anne Hathaway) Ian McKellen (Earl of Southampton)	Set in the 1610s, the film chronicles Shakespeare's final years as he retires and returns home to Stratford-upon-Avon.
"Hard Times" (Good Omens)	TV	(United Kingdom)	2019	Douglas Mackinnon	Reece Shearsmith (William Shakespeare)	An Amazon Prime miniseries. The episode "Hard Times" includes a flashback where Aziraphale and Crowley met up at the Globe Theatre in London in 1601, where a frustrated Shakespeare laments only a miracle could make people watch Hamlet. Crowley performs a miracle for Aziraphile so that Hamlet is a success.
"Romeo v Juliet: Dawn of Justness" (Legends of Tomorrow)	TV	(United States)	2020	Alexandra La Roche	Rowan Schlosberg (William Shakespeare)	An episode of Legends of Tomorrow which the legends have to help Shakespeare write his masterpiece.
Hamnet	Film	(United Kingdom); (United States)	2025	Chloé Zhao	Jessie Buckley (Agnes Hathaway); Paul Mescal (William Shakespeare)	Based on the 2020 novel of the same name by Maggie O'Farrell, the film focuses on Agnes (Anne) Hathaway and William Shakespeare before and after the death of their 11-year-old son, Hamnet.

=== Acting Shakespeare ===
Title	M	C	Y	Directors	Starring	Description
To Be or Not To Be		(United States)	1942	Ernst Lubitsch		The story of an acting company in 1939 Poland.
Prince of Players		(United States)	1955	Philip Dunne		Edwin Booth.
Shakespeare Wallah		(India); (United States)	1965	James Ivory	Felicity Kendal (Lizzie); Shashi Kapoor (Sanju); Madhur Jaffrey (Manjula)	The story of an acting company in India.
The Goodbye Girl		(United States)	1977	Herbert Ross		Contains scenes in which the Richard Dreyfuss character rehearses and performs Richard III.
To Be or Not To Be		(United States)	1983	Mel Brooks		A remake of the Ernst Lubitsch film.
Dead Poets Society	Film	(United States)	1989	Peter Weir		Portrays a student (played by Robert Sean Leonard) who performs the role of Puck in a school production of A Midsummer Night's Dream against his father's wishes.
The Dreamer of Oz: The L. Frank Baum Story		(United States)	1990	Jack Bender		Includes a badly-performed rendition of Hamlet's graveyard speech (not by L. Frank Baum, who plays a watchman, though he did play Hamlet over 200 times in real life).
A Midwinter's Tale		(United Kingdom)	1996	Kenneth Branagh	Michael Maloney (Joe (Hamlet)); Julia Sawalha (Nina (Ophelia))	Tells the story of a group of actors performing Hamlet.
Looking for Richard		(United States)	1996	Al Pacino		A documentary account of Al Pacino's quest to perform Richard III, featuring substantial excerpts from the play. It includes the talents of Winona Ryder, Alec Baldwin and Kevin Spacey.
RSC Production Casebook – The Winter's Tale	Video	(United Kingdom)				A documentary of the RSC production listed separately above, including interviews with Antony Sher, Greg Doran, Cicely Berry (the RSC's voice coach) and other members of the cast and crew, together with lengthy excerpts from the show itself.

=== Shakespeare at the Academy Awards ===
Year	Film	Character	Actor	Category	Status
1936	Romeo and Juliet	Juliet Capulet	Norma Shearer	Best Lead Actress	Nominated
1936	Romeo and Juliet	Tybalt	Basil Rathbone	Best Supporting Actor	Nominated
1946	Henry V	King Henry V of England	Laurence Olivier	Best Lead Actor	Nominated
1947	A Double Life	Anthony "Tony" John ^{[A]}	Ronald Colman	Best Lead Actor	Won
1948	Hamlet	Prince Hamlet	Laurence Olivier	Best Lead Actor	Won
1948	Hamlet	Ophelia	Jean Simmons	Best Supporting Actress	Nominated
1953	Julius Caesar	Mark Antony	Marlon Brando	Best Lead Actor	Nominated
1955	Richard III	King Richard III of England	Laurence Olivier	Best Lead Actor	Nominated
1961	West Side Story	Bernardo Vasquez-Nuñez	George Chakiris	Best Supporting Actor	Won
1961	West Side Story	Anita Palacio	Rita Moreno	Best Supporting Actress	Won
1963	Cleopatra	Julius Caesar	Rex Harrison	Best Lead Actor	Nominated
1965	Othello	Othello	Laurence Olivier	Best Lead Actor	Nominated
1965	Othello	Iago	Frank Finlay	Best Supporting Actor	Nominated
1965	Othello	Desdemona	Maggie Smith	Best Supporting Actress	Nominated
1965	Othello	Emilia	Joyce Redman	Best Supporting Actress	Nominated
1977	The Goodbye Girl	Elliot Garfield ^{[B]}	Richard Dreyfuss	Best Lead Actor	Won
1989	Henry V	King Henry V of England	Kenneth Branagh	Best Lead Actor	Nominated
1998	Shakespeare in Love ^{[C]}	Viola De Lesseps	Gwyneth Paltrow	Best Lead Actress	Won
1998	Shakespeare in Love ^{[C]}	Philip Henslowe	Geoffrey Rush	Best Supporting Actor	Nominated
1998	Shakespeare in Love ^{[C]}	Queen Elizabeth I of England	Judi Dench	Best Supporting Actress	Won
2021	West Side Story	Anita Palacio	Ariana DeBose	Best Supporting Actress	Won
2021	The Tragedy of Macbeth	King Macbeth of Scotland	Denzel Washington	Best Lead Actor	Nominated
2025	Hamnet ^{[D]}	Agnes Hathaway-Shakespeare	Jessie Buckley	Best Lead Actress	Won

==== Notes ====
- ^{A} This character performs, and subsequently succumbs to the madness of, Othello as portrayed in the play within the film.
- ^{B} This character performs Richard III in an over-the-top flamboyant way, as instructed by the play's director.
- ^{C} Historical fiction about the Bard's love affair with an amalgamated rendition of the Twelfth Night character.
- ^{D} Biopic about the relationship between William Shakespeare and his wife, as seen through the latter's perspective.

=== Television series ===
NOTE: "ShakespeaRe-Told", "The Animated Shakespeare" and "BBC Television Shakespeare" series have been covered above, under the respective play performed in each episode.

- Playing Shakespeare (TV, UK, 1979–1984) began as two consecutive episodes of the UK arts series The South Bank Show, and developed into a nine-part series of its own. It features director John Barton, then a leading light of the Royal Shakespeare Company, putting a host of actors through their paces. Many of those actors are now household names, including Judi Dench, Michael Pennington, Patrick Stewart, Ben Kingsley, David Suchet and Ian McKellen. The episodes were:
  - The South Bank Show: "Speaking Shakespearean Verse"
  - The South Bank Show: "Preparing to Perform Shakespeare"
  - 1. "The Two Traditions"
  - 2. "Using the Verse"
  - 3. "Language and Character"
  - 4. "Set Speeches and Soliloquies"
  - 5. "Irony and Ambiguity"
  - 6. "Passion and Coolness"
  - 7. "Rehearsing the Text"
  - 8. "Exploring a Character"
  - 9. "Poetry and Hidden Poetry"

Three further episodes were filmed but never edited or screened. They were to be called "Using the Prose", "Using the Sonnets" and "Contemporary Shakespeare". Their text can be read in the book "Playing Shakespeare" by John Barton.

- The Shakespeare Sessions (USA 2003): An American spin-off from Playing Shakespeare (above) in which John Barton directs notable American actors in Shakespeare scenes.
- Conjuring Shakespeare (TV, UK, 199?): A series of half-hour documentaries hosted by Fiona Shaw, each episode dealing with scenes from a particular play.
- In Search of Shakespeare (TV, UK, 2003): A BBC documentary series of four 1-hour episodes, chronicling the life of William Shakespeare, written and presented by Michael Wood.
- Slings & Arrows (TV, Canada, 2003–2006): A Canadian comedy drama set in the New Burbage Shakespeare Festival, a fictional Shakespearean festival in a small town in Canada comparable to the real-life Stratford Shakespeare Festival. With its entire run written by Susan Coyne, Bob Martin and Mark McKinney, directed by Peter Wellington, and starring Paul Gross, Martha Burns and Stephen Ouimette, it aired in three seasons of six 1-hour episodes each.
- Som & Fúria (TV, Brazil, 2009): A Brazilian adaptation of Slings and Arrows.

=== Academic ===
- The "Themes of Shakespeare" series contains straight-to-video short documentaries, each considering the theme of a particular play. The contributors are Professor Stanley Wells, and Dr. Robert Smallwood of the Shakespeare Birthplace Trust.
- Two lecture series given by professor Peter Saccio were filmed and are commercially available on DVD.

=== Miscellaneous ===
- Theatre of Blood (UK, 1973). Vincent Price plays a Shakespearean actor who takes poetic revenge on the critics who denied him recognition. He kills his critics using methods inspired by several of Shakespeare's plays: Julius Caesar, Troilus and Cressida, The Merchant of Venice, Richard III, Othello, Cymbeline, Romeo and Juliet, Henry VI Part One, Titus Andronicus, and King Lear.

Douglas Hickox director
Vincent Price as Edward Lionheart
Diana Rigg as Edwina Lionheart

- The Complete Works of William Shakespeare (Abridged) by the Reduced Shakespeare Company is a successful West End stage comedy, containing some element of all 37 canonical plays. A film of one of the live performances is commercially available.
- The Royal Shakespeare Company have released a number of videos in the "Great Performances" series, which contain excerpts from stage performances.

== See also ==
- List of titles of works taken from Shakespeare

== Sources ==
- Abel, Richard (2005). Encyclopedia of Early Cinema. Taylor & Francis. ISBN 9780415234405.
- "The 13th Academy Awards (1941) Nominees and Winners". Academy of Motion Picture Arts and Sciences. 1941.
- "The 63rd Academy Awards (1991) Nominees and Winners". Academy of Motion Picture Arts and Sciences. 1991.
- Axmaker, Sean (n.d.). "Jubal (1956)". Turner Classic Movies. Archived from the original on July 22, 2011.
- "Film | Actor in a Supporting Role in 1992". British Academy of Film and Television Arts. 1992.
- Ball, Robert Hamilton (2013). Shakespeare on Silent Film: A Strange Eventful History. Routledge Library Editions: Film and Literature. Vol. 1. Routledge. ISBN 9781134980840.
- Bamford, Kenton (1999). Distorted Images: British National Identity and Film in the 1920s. Cinema and society. London and New York: I.B. Tauris. ISBN 9781860643583.
- "Shakespeare goes Maori". BBC News. 4 December 2001.
- Bennett, Carl (6 October 2009). "Romeo and Juliet (1916)". The Progressive Silent Film List.
- Bennett, Carl (26 January 2015). "Macbeth (1913)". The Progressive Silent Film List.
- Bennett, Carl (12 December 2008). "Macbeth (1916)". The Progressive Silent Film List.
- Berardinelli, James (n.d.). "Hamlet (1996)". Reelviews.net.
- Bevington, David (2011). Murder Most Foul: Hamlet Through the Ages. Oxford: Oxford University Press. doi:10.1093/acprof:oso/9780199599103.001.0001. ISBN 9780199599103 – via Oxford Scholarship Online.
- Billington, Michael (27 April 2015). "Great performances: Vanessa Redgrave in As You Like It". The Guardian. ISSN 0261-3077.
- Brady, Frank (1989). Citizen Welles: A Biography of Orson Welles. New York: Charles Scribner's Sons. ISBN 0-385-26759-2.
- Brooke, Michael (2014). "Shakespeare on Screen: The Bard from Beerbohm Tree to Branagh". BFI Screenonline. Archived from the original on 2009-09-07.
- Brown, Gene (1995). Movie Time: A Chronology of Hollywood and the Movie Industry from its Beginnings to the Present. New York: MacMillan. ISBN 0-02-860429-6.
- Brownlow, Kevin; Kobal, John (1980). Hollywood: The Pioneers. Knopf Doubleday Publishing Group. ISBN 978-0394508511.
- Brooke, Michael (n.d.). "Othello (1990)". BFI Screenonline. Archived from the original on 2009-09-07.
- Buchanan, Judith (2009). Shakespeare on Silent Film: An Excellent Dumb Discourse. Cambridge: Cambridge University Press. ISBN 978-0521871990.
- Buchanan, Judith (2011). "Shakespeare and Silent Film". In Burnett, Mark Thornton; Streete, Adrian; Wray, Ramona (eds.). The Edinburgh Companion to Shakespeare and the Arts. Edinburgh Companions to Literature. Edinburgh: Edinburgh University Press. pp. 467–83. doi:10.3366/edinburgh/9780748635238.003.0026. ISBN 9780748635238 – via University Press Scholarship Online.
- Buchanan, Judith R. (2014). Shakespeare on Film. Inside Film. Routledge. ISBN 9781317874973.
- "All's Well That Ends Well (1968)". British Universities Film and Video Council. n.d.
- "All's Well That Ends Well (1978)". British Universities Film and Video Council. n.d.
- "As You Like It (1936)". British Universities Film and Video Council. n.d.
- "As You Like It (1963)". British Universities Film and Video Council. n.d.
- "Julius Caesar (1970)". British Universities Film and Video Council. n.d.
- "Let the Devil Wear Black". British Universities Film and Video Council. n.d.
- "Macbeth (1908)". British Universities Film and Video Council. n.d.
- "Macbeth (1911)". British Universities Film and Video Council. n.d.
- "Macbeth (1913)". British Universities Film and Video Council. n.d.
- "Macbeth (1954)". British Universities Film and Video Council. n.d.
- "Macbeth (1982)". British Universities Film and Video Council. n.d.
- "Merchant of Venice, The (1936)". British Universities Film and Video Council. n.d.
- "Merchant of Venice, The (1974)". British Universities Film and Video Council. n.d.
- "Prospero's Books". British Universities Film and Video Council. n.d.
- "Quella Sporca Storia del West". British Universities Film and Video Council. n.d.
- "Romeo and Juliet (1968)". British Universities Film and Video Council. n.d.
- "Said-E-Havas". British Universities Film and Video Council. n.d.
- "Sen Noci Svatojanske". British Universities Film and Video Council. n.d.
- "Sogno di una Notte d'Estate". British Universities Film and Video Council. n.d.
- "Taming of the Shrew, The (1967)". British Universities Film and Video Council. n.d.
- Burnett, Mark Thornton (2012). Shakespeare and World Cinema. Cambridge: Cambridge University Press. doi:10.1017/CBO9780511760211. ISBN 9780511760211 – via Cambridge Core.
- "Twins for The Bard". The Canberra Times. Fairfax Media. 10 October 1966. p. 15 – via National Library of Australia.
- Canby, Vincent (23 November 1971). "King Lear". The New York Times.
- "Awards 1959: All Awards". Cannes Film Festival. 1959. Archived from the original on 25 December 2013.
- "Macbeth". Cannes Film Festival. 1987.
- "Bravo! Presents Timothy Findley's Play Elizabeth Rex, November 17". Channel Canada. n.d.
- Crosby, John (20 January 1955). "Video Discovering Literary Classics: Millions View a Single Show". Toledo Blade.
- Crowther, Bosley (1 August 1940). "The Boys from Syracuse (1940)". The New York Times.
- Crowther, Bosley (5 June 1953). "Julius Caesar and Two Other Arrivals; Shakespeare Tragedy, Filmed by M-G-M With a Notable Cast, Unfolds at Booth". The New York Times.
- Crowther, Bosley (13 September 1955). "Orson Welles Revises Othello; Scraps Shakespeare's Plot for Visual Effect". The New York Times.
- Das, Sisir Kumar (2005). "Shakespeare in Indian Languages". In Trivedi, Poonam; Bartholomeusz, Dennis (eds.). India's Shakespeare: Translation, Interpretation, and Performance. University of Delaware Press. pp. 47–73. ISBN 978-0-87413-881-8.
- Davies, Anthony; Wells, Stanley (1994). Shakespeare and the Moving Image: The Plays on Film and Television. Cambridge: Cambridge University Press. ISBN 9780521435734.
- Dickson, Andrew (2015). Worlds Elsewhere: Journeys Around Shakespeare's Globe. Random House. ISBN 9781448155095.
- DiMare, Philip C. (2011). Movies in American History: An Encyclopedia. Santa Barbara: ABC-CLIO. ISBN 978-1-59884-296-8.
- Ebert, Roger (24 January 1997). "Hamlet". Chicago Sun-Times.
- Elley, Derek (6 October 1992). "Review: As You Like It". Variety.
- "Khoon ka Khoon (Hamlet), 1935, 122 mins". Film Heritage Foundation. n.d.
- Fort Lee Film Commission (2006). Fort Lee: Birthplace of the Motion Picture Industry. Arcadia Publishing. ISBN 0-738-54501-5.
- Gale, Steven H. (2003). Sharp Cut: Harold Pinter's Screenplays and the Artistic Process. Lexington: University Press of Kentucky. ISBN 978-0-8131-2244-1.
- Garber, Marjorie (2007). "Shakespeare on Film". Harvard Film Archive. Archived from the original on 28 September 2013.
- Gielgud, John (1979). An Actor and His Time. New York: Applause Books. ISBN 1-55783-299-4.
- Graser, Marc (11 November 2014). "Disney Dates Lucasfilm's Animated 'Strange Magic' for January 2015". Variety.
- Griggs, Yvonne (2009). Shakespeare's King Lear: A close study of the relationship between text and film. Screen Adaptations. A&C Black. ISBN 9781408144015.
- "Thailand bans Macbeth film Shakespeare Must Die". The Guardian. 4 April 2012.
- Guneratne, Anthony (2006). "Cinema Studies: 'Thou Dost Usurp Authority': Beerbohm Tree, Reinhardt, Olivier, Welles, and the Politics of Adapting Shakespeare". In Henderson, Diana E. (ed.). A Concise Companion to Shakespeare on Screen. Malden, MA: Blackwell. pp. 31–53. ISBN 978-1-4051-1511-7.
- Hadfield, Andrew (2005). William Shakespeare's Othello: A Routledge Study Guide and Sourcebook. Routledge Guides to Literature. London: Routledge. ISBN 9781134587971.
- Hagopian, Kevin Jack (2 April 1998). "New York State Writers Institute Film Notes - Ran". Archived from the original on 12 March 2007.
- Hodgdon, Barbara; Worthen, William B. (2005). A Companion to Shakespeare and Performance. Blackwell Companions to Literature and Culture. Wiley-Blackwell. ISBN 978-1-4051-1104-1.
- Howard, John (5 February 1965). "Melbourne's finest production to date". The Canberra Times. Vol. 39, no. 11, 072. Australian Capital Territory, Australia. p. 13 – via National Library of Australia.
- Howard, Tony (2007). "Shakespeare's cinematic offshoots". In Jackson, Russell (ed.). The Cambridge Companion to Shakespeare on Film. Cambridge Companions to Literature (2nd ed.). Cambridge: Cambridge University Press. pp. 303–23. doi:10.1017/CCOL0521866006.018. ISBN 9781139001434 – via Cambridge Core.
- "Thai Saheb bags national award for best film". The Indian Express. 10 May 1998.
- Jackson, Russell, ed. (2007). The Cambridge Companion to Shakespeare on Film. Cambridge Companions to Literature. Cambridge: Cambridge University Press. doi:10.1017/CCOL0521866006. ISBN 978-0521685016 – via Cambridge Core.
- Kachur, B. A. (1991). "The First Shakespeare Film: A Reconsideration and Reconstruction of Tree's King John". Theatre Survey. 32 (1). American Society for Theatre Research: 43–63. doi:10.1017/S0040557400009455. eISSN 1475-4533. ISSN 0040-5574. S2CID 163724624 – via Cambridge Core.
- Kanfer, Stefan (2009). Somebody: The Reckless Life and Remarkable Career of Marlon Brando. New York: Random House. ISBN 978-1-4000-7804-2.
- Kelly, Ray (n.d.). "Filming Othello". Wellesnet.
- Kennedy, Dennis; Lan, Yong Li (2010). Shakespeare in Asia: Contemporary Performance. Cambridge: Cambridge University Press. ISBN 978-0-521-51552-8.
- Lehmann, Courtney; Burnett, Mark Thornton; Rippy, Marguerite; Wray, Ramona (2015). Welles, Kurosawa, Kozintsev, Zeffirelli. Great Shakespeareans. Vol. XVII. Bloomsbury Academic. ISBN 978-1-4725-7958-4.
- Lei, Bi-qi Beatrice (2012). "Paradox of Chinese Nationalism: Two Gentlemen of Verona in Silent Film". In Lei, Bi-qi Beatrice; Perng, Ching-Hsi (eds.). Shakespeare in Culture. Taipei: NTU Press. pp. 251–84. ISBN 978-986-03-2074-9.
- Macmillan, Alissa (1 June 2002). "Every Inch A 'King' Patrick Stewart's Lear reigns in 19th-century Texas". New York Daily News. Archived from the original on March 4, 2016.
- Malick, Javed (2005). "Appropriating Shakespeare Freely: Parsi Theater's First Urdu Play Khurshid". In Trivedi, Poonam; Bartholomeusz, Dennis (eds.). India's Shakespeare: Translation, Interpretation, and Performance. University of Delaware Press. pp. 82–94. ISBN 978-0-87413-881-8.
- Martin, Peter (5 April 2012). "Thailand Bans Shakespeare Must Die, Fearing Societal 'Disunity'". Twitch Film. Archived from the original on 8 April 2012.
- McKernan, Luke (30 May 2008). "Pen and pictures no. 3 – J.M. Barrie". The Bioscope.
- Mereghetti, Paolo; Pezzotta, Alberto (2010). Il Mereghetti: Dizionario dei film 2011. Vol. 1. Baldini Castoldi Dalai Editore. ISBN 978-8860736260.
- Munden, Kenneth White (1997). The American Film Institute Catalog of Motion Pictures Produced in the United States. University of California Press. ISBN 978-0-520-20969-5.
- Murphy, Robert (2006). Directors in British and Irish Cinema: A Reference Companion. British Film Institute. ISBN 978-1-84457-125-3.
- Musgrove, Nan (5 October 1960). "The knights jousted as jets roared". Australian Women's Weekly. National Library of Australia. pp. 65–6.
- Nugent, Frank S. (21 August 1936). "Metro's Film of Romeo and Juliet Opens at the Astor—My American Wife at the Music Hall". The New York Times.
- Osborne, Laurie E. (2003). "Mixing Media and Animating Shakespeare". In Burt, Richard; Boose, Lynda E. (eds.). Shakespeare, The Movie II: Popularizing the Plays on Film, TV, Video, and DVD. London: Routledge. ISBN 9780415282994.
- Pang, Laikwan (2002). Building a New China in Cinema: The Chinese Left-wing Cinema Movement, 1932–1937. New York: Rowman & Littlefield. ISBN 9780742509467.
- Polt, Harriet (1966–1967). "Review: Shakespeare Wallah by James Ivory; Ismail Merchant". Film Quarterly. 20 (2). University of California Press: 33–5. doi:10.2307/1210693. eISSN 1533-8630. ISSN 0015-1386. JSTOR 1210693.
- Rajadhyaksha, Ashish; Willemen, Paul (2014). "Modi, Sohrab Merwanji (1897–1984)". Encyclopedia of Indian Cinema (new revised ed.). Routledge. p. 150. ISBN 9781135943189.
- Rajadhyaksha, Ashish; Willemen, Paul (2014). "Sahu, Kishore (1915–80)". Encyclopedia of Indian Cinema (new revised ed.). Routledge. p. 203. ISBN 9781135943189.
- Rishi, Tilak (2012). Bless You Bollywood!: A Tribute to Hindi Cinema on completing 100 Years. Trafford Publishing. ISBN 978-1-4669-3963-9.
- Roberts, Jerry (2009). Encyclopedia of Television Film Directors. Scarecrow Press. ISBN 9780810863781.
- Robertson, Patrick, ed. (1986). The Guinness Book of Almost Everything You Didn't Need to Know About the Movies. Guinness oddfax. Great Britain: Guinness Superlatives. ISBN 978-0-85112-481-0.
- Rothwell, Kenneth S.; Melzer, Annabelle Henkin (1990). Shakespeare on Screen: An International Filmography and Videography. Neal-Schuman. ISBN 9781555700492.
- Rothwell, Kenneth S. (2000). "Shakespeare Goes Digital". Cinéaste. 25 (3): 50–2. ISSN 0009-7004. JSTOR 41689270.
- "Hamlet (1996)". Rotten Tomatoes. n.d.
- Scheib, Ronnie (2 September 2004). "Review: Souli". Variety.
- Sitsky, Bob; McPherson, Colin (November 2005). "Conversation with Ruth Page (now Harris)". ABC-TV at Gore Hill in the Fifties. Archived from the original on 2017-02-14.
- Sterritt, David (1999). The Films of Jean-Luc Godard: Seeing the Invisible. Cambridge University Press. ISBN 0521589711.
- "Macbeth on television". Sydney Morning Herald. 20 October 1960. p. 25.
- "Shakespeare Play Adapted". Sydney Morning Herald. 13 August 1962. p. 14.
- Thakur, Vikram Singh (2014). "Parsi Shakespeare: The Precursor to "Bollywood Shakespeare"". In Dionne, Craig; Kapadia, Parmita (eds.). Bollywood Shakespeares. Palgrave Macmillan. pp. 21–44. ISBN 978-1-137-37556-8.
- Thoopkrajae, Veena (10 April 2012). "Are we really so scared of our own shadow?". The Nation. Archived from the original on 17 August 2016.
- "As You Like It". Time Out London.
- Tornabuoni, Lietta (6 September 1983). "Anche Shakespeare fa giovane il film" (Flash). La Stampa. No. 210. p. 20.
- Urban, Andrew L.; Keller, Louise (21 September 2006). "Wright, Geoffrey – Macbeth". Urban Cinefile. Archived from the original on 5 March 2017.
- Vaughan, Virginia Mason; Vaughan, Alden T., eds. (2011). The Tempest. The Arden Shakespeare, third series. Bloomsbury Publishing. ISBN 978-1-408-13347-7 – via Bloomsbury Drama Online.
- Vaughan, Alden T.; Vaughan, Virginia Mason (2012). Shakespeare in America. Oxford: Oxford University Press. ISBN 978-0-19-956638-9.
- Du Verger, Jean (2009). "Influence and resurgence of cinema and cinematic motifs in two French stagings of Antony and Cleopatra". In Hatchuel, Sarah; Vienne-Guerrin, Nathalie (eds.). Shakespeare on Screen: The Roman Plays. Publications des universités de Rouen et du Havre. Mont-Saint-Aignan: Presses universitaires de Rouen et du Havre. pp. 271–94. ISBN 978-2-87775-478-1.
- Verma, Rajiva (2005). "Shakespeare in Hindi Cinema". In Trivedi, Poonam; Bartholomeusz, Dennis (eds.). India's Shakespeare: Translation, Interpretation, and Performance. University of Delaware Press. pp. 269–90. ISBN 978-0-87413-881-8.
- Verma, Rajiva (2012). "Shakespeare in Indian Cinema: Appropriation, Assimilation, and Engagement". In Bishop, Tom; Huang, Alexa; Bradshaw, Graham; Chaudhuri, Sukanta (eds.). Shakespeare in India. The Shakespearean International Yearbook. Vol. 12. Routledge. pp. 83–96. ISBN 9781409451167. ISSN 1465-5098.
- Voigts-Virchow, Eckartm (2004). Janespotting and Beyond: British Heritage Retrovisions Since the Mid-1990s. Gunter Narr Verlag. ISBN 9783823360964.
- Waites, James (1993). "Twelfth Night". In Murray, Scott; Caputo, Raffaele (eds.). Australian film, 1978–1992: A Survey of Theatrical Features. Melbourne: Oxford University Press. ISBN 9780195535846.
- Walton, Storry; Jeffrey, Tom (7 June 2016). "ABC television pioneer who went on to direct The Avengers and Upstairs Downstairs". Obituaries. The Sydney Morning Herald.
- Wayne, Valerie (2004). "Te Tangata Whai Rawa o Weniti, The Maori Merchant of Venice (review)". The Contemporary Pacific. 16 (2). University of Hawai'i Press: 425–9. doi:10.1353/cp.2004.0063. eISSN 1527-9464. hdl:10125/13817. ISSN 1043-898X. S2CID 161678052.
- Wilders, John; Alexander, Peter, eds. (1982). The Merry Wives of Windsor. The BBC TV Shakespeare. Vol. 40. London: BBC Books. ISBN 9780563201151.
- Willems, Michèle (2007). "Video and its paradoxes". In Jackson, Russell (ed.). The Cambridge Companion to Shakespeare on Film. Cambridge Companions to Literature (2nd ed.). Cambridge University Press. pp. 35–46. doi:10.1017/CCOL0521866006.003. ISBN 9781139001434 – via Cambridge Core.
- Willis, Susan (1991). The BBC Shakespeare Plays: Making the Televised Canon. Chapel Hill, NC: University of North Carolina Press. ISBN 9780807843178.
- Young, Mark, ed. (1999). The Guinness Book of Records: 1999. Guinness Book of Records. Bantam Books. ISBN 9780553580754.
