= 1899 in film =

The following is an overview of the events of 1899 in film, including a list of films released and notable births.

== Events ==
- September
  - King John, a silent compilation of three short scenes from a forthcoming stage production by Herbert Beerbohm Tree with film direction by William Kennedy Dickson and Walter Pfeffer Dando, is filmed in London, the first known film based on a Shakespeare play.
  - Mitchell and Kenyon of Blackburn in the north of England release three fiction films under the 'Norden' brand which attract national attention – The Tramp's Surprise, The Tramps and the Artist and Kidnapping by Indians, the latter being the first Western.
- November – The oldest surviving Japanese film, Momijigari, is shot by Tsunekichi Shibata in Tokyo as a record of kabuki actors Onoe Kikugorō V and Ichikawa Danjūrō IX performing a scene from the play Momijigari.
- T. C. Hepworth invents Biokam, a 17.5 mm format which also is the first format to have a center perforation.
- John Alfred Prestwich invents a 13 mm amateur format.

== Films released in 1899 ==
- Beauty and the Beast, produced for Pathe (French)
- The Biter Bit, produced by Bamforth & Co Ltd
- Cagliostro's Mirror, directed by George Melies
- Cinderella (Cendrillon), directed by Georges Méliès
- Cleopatra, directed by George Melies, later re-released as Cleopatra's Tomb
- Cripple Creek Bar-Room Scene, produced by Edison Studios
- The Demon Barber, produced by American Mutoscope
- The Devil in a Convent, directed by Georges Méliès, later re-released as The Sign of the Cross
- The Dreyfus Affair, a series of docudramas directed by Georges Méliès
- The Haunted House, directed by Siegmund Lubin
- How Would You Like to Be the Ice Man?
- The Jeffries-Sharkey Fight, a documentary that is in all likelihood lost; running over two hours, this is one of the oldest feature films
- Kidnapping by Indians
- King John
- The Kiss in the Tunnel, directed by George Albert Smith; has been cited as cinema's first example of narrative editing
- Major Wilson's Last Stand
- A Midnight Episode, directed by George Melies, aka A Good Bed
- The Miser's Doom (British), directed by Walter R. Booth
- A Mysterious Portrait, directed by Georges Méliès
- The Pillar of Fire (aka The Column of Fire), directed by George Melies, adapting a scene from the novel "She" by H. Rider Haggard
- Raising Spirits, directed by George Melies

== Births ==
Month	Date	Name	Country	Profession	Died
January	6	Phyllis Haver	US	Actress	1960
January	24	Beulah Ashley	US	Actress, Screenwriter, script Supervisor	1965
January	30	Martita Hunt	UK	Actress	1969
February	6	Ramon Novarro	Mexico	Actor	1968
February	15	Gale Sondergaard	US	Actress	1985
February	21	Sigrid Holmquist	Sweden	Actress	1970
February	22	George O'Hara	US	Actor, Screenwriter	1966
March	6	Jay C. Flippen	US	Actor	1971
March	14	Ada Kramm	Norway	Actress	1981
March	23	Dora Gerson	Germany	Actress	1943
March	27	Gloria Swanson	US	Actress	1983
April	19	George O'Brien	US	Actor	1985
April	26	Guinn "Big Boy" Williams	US	Actor	1962
May	10	Fred Astaire	US	Actor, Dancer	1987
June	4	Lane Chandler	US	Actor	1972
June	15	Einar Hanson	Sweden	Actor	1927
June	30	Madge Bellamy	US	Actress	1990
July	1	Charles Laughton	UK	Actor	1962
July	7	George Cukor	US	Director	1983
July	14	Martha Mansfield	US	Actress	1923
July	17	James Cagney	US	Actor	1986
August	9	Paul Kelly	US	Actor	1956
August	13	Alfred Hitchcock	UK	Director	1980
August	16	Glenn Strange	US	Actor	1973
August	19	Colleen Moore	US	Actress	1988
August	28	Charles Boyer	France	Actor	1978
September	1	Richard Arlen	US	Actor	1976
September	9	Neil Hamilton	US	Actor	1984
November	6	Francis Lederer	Austria-Hungary	Actor	2000
November	11	Pat O'Brien	US	Actor	1983
November	17	Douglas Shearer	Canada	Sound Engineer	1971
November	21	Jobyna Ralston	US	Actress	1967
December	8	John Qualen	Canada	Actor	1987
December	16	Noël Coward	UK	Actor, Playwright, Composer	1973
December	25	Humphrey Bogart	US	Actor	1957
