= Living Wigan =

1902 film by Sagar Mitchell and James Kenyon

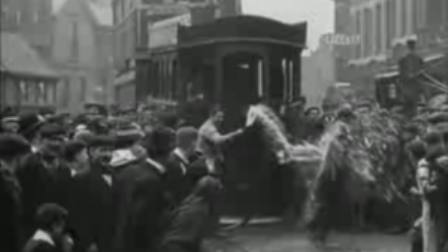
- Screenshot from the film
- Directed by: James Kenyon; Sagar Mitchell
- Produced by: James Kenyon; Sagar Mitchell
- Cinematography: James Kenyon; Sagar Mitchell
- Production company: Mitchell & Kenyon
- Release date: 1902
- Running time: 2 minute
- Country: United Kingdom
- Language: Silent

Living Wigan is a 1902 short silent documentary film directed by James Kenyon and Sagar Mitchell, showing street life and a steam tram in Wigan town centre in August 1902. The film, which premiered in Wigan Town Hall before the Coronation celebrations of King Edward VII in 1902. It formed part of the two-hour film show Live in Wigan. The tram featured in the film was run by Wigan Corporation Tramways.

"This film buzzes with the energy and vibrancy of street life in the city," according to the BFI, and the filmmakers, "are seen introducing a comic moment into a possibly more formal opening event," and "actively encouraged the audience to respond to the camera with play acting, comic moments - with the crowd not quite knowing if to respond to the camera or concentrating on the curious event behind them," with, "a farcical moment of a guy splashing water at the crowds with a hosepipe."
