= Morecambe Church Lads' Brigade at Drill =

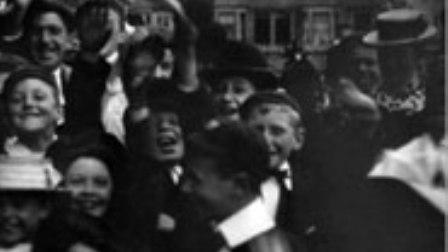
- Screenshot from the film
- Directed by: James Kenyon; Sagar Mitchell
- Produced by: James Kenyon; Sagar Mitchell
- Cinematography: James Kenyon; Sagar Mitchell
- Production company: Mitchell & Kenyon
- Release date: 3 July 1901
- Running time: 2 mins
- Country: United Kingdom
- Language: Silent

Morecambe Church Lads' Brigade at Drill is a 1901 British short silent documentary film, directed by James Kenyon and Sagar Mitchell, showing the parade drill of the Morecambe Church Lads' Brigade on 3 July 1901. The film, which was premiered at the Winter Gardens in Morecambe on the same day it was filmed, was popular and went on to be shown at other venues in the North of England.
