= Wigan Corporation Tramways =

Tramway service in Wigan, England

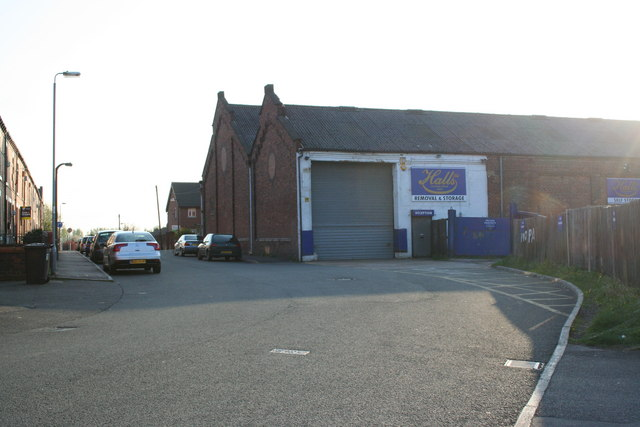
- Tram Depot, Platt Bridge

Operation
- Locale: Wigan
- Open: 25 January 1901
- Close: 28 March 1931
- Status: Closed

Infrastructure
- Track gauge: 3 ft 6 in (1,067 mm) and 4 ft 8 1/2 in (1,435 mm)
- Propulsion system: Electric

Statistics
- Route length: 24.83 miles (39.96 km)

Wigan Corporation Tramways operated a tramway service in Wigan, England, between 1901 and 1931. The first tramway service in the town was run by the Wigan Tramways Company, whose horse trams began carrying passengers in 1880. They began replacing horses with steam tram locomotives from 1882, but the company failed in 1890 when a receiver was appointed to manage it. The Wigan and District Tramways Company took over the system in 1893 and ran it until 1902. Meanwhile, Wigan Corporation were planning their own tramway system, obtaining an authorising act of Parliament, the Wigan Corporation Act 1893 (56 & 57 Vict. c. clxxxii), and a second act of Parliament, the Wigan Corporation Act 1898 (61 & 62 Vict. c. cxxxv). This enabled them to build electric tramways, and in 1902, they took over the lines of the Wigan and District Tramways Company.

At the peak of Britain’s first-generation tramways, it was possible to travel by tram all the way from Pier Head at Liverpool to the Pennines in Rochdale by tram.

The horse and steam tramways had used a gauge of 3 ft 6 in (1,067 mm), and the corporation initially used the same gauge for their tramways, but then decided to use the standard gauge of 4 ft 8 1/2 in (1,435 mm) for new lines and to convert the old routes. The network was gradually extended, as was the fleet of tramcars. In 1923 the line to Aspull was closed to allow it to be regauged, but the section beyond the borough boundary was replaced by motor buses. That left just one narrow gauge line, and when renewals were needed, it was replaced by a trolleybus line in 1925. Further closures of the tramway system occurred in 1927 and 1930, with full closure occurring in 1931. Because the trolleybus system was very small, and needed to use the tram tracks to get from the depot to the start of the route, that also closed later in 1931, marking the end of electric traction in Wigan.

== History ==
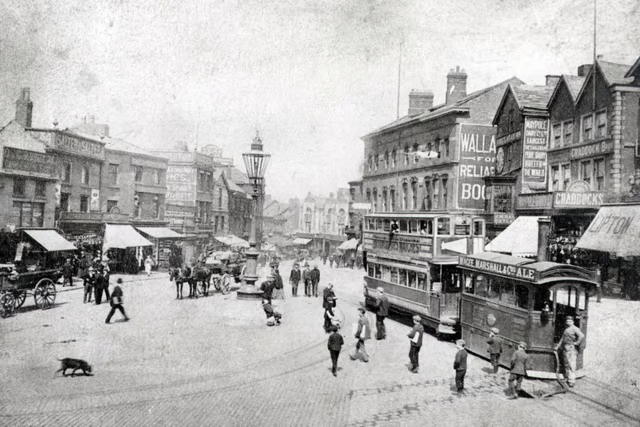
A steam tram in Market Place, Wigan town centre at the turn of the 20th century

The first public tramway in Wigan was authorised by the Wigan Tramways Order 1879, confirmed by the Tramways Orders Confirmation Act 1879 (42 & 43 Vict. c. cxciii). Holme and King of Wigan acted as contractors for the construction of the line, which ran from Wigan town centre, with a terminus near the London and North Western Railway bridge in Wallgate, along Queen Street to the Black Bull public house at Lamberhead Green, Pemberton. The Wigan Tramways Company operated the line which was a little over 2 miles (3.2 km) long. It was built to a gauge of 3 ft 6 in (1,067 mm), and for the opening, which took place on 2 August 1880, the company bought eight double-deck horse trams from the Ashbury Railway Carriage and Iron Company Ltd of Manchester. They ran of Eades reversible trucks, which allowed the body to be swung through 180 degrees at the termini, ready for the return journey. A month and a half later, on 23 September 1880, the line was extended along Wallgate to the Market Place. The trams were stabled in a depot at Smethurst Street, Pemberton, near to the western terminus.

In 1881 the company began to experiment, using steam tram locomotives to pull the tramcars. This practice was authorised by the Board of Trade on 11 February 1882. By the summer of that year, the company owned the first four locomotives ever built by Wilkinson and Company of Wigan. They were numbered 1 to 4, corresponding to their works numbers. Four top covered tramcars were obtained from Starbuck Car and Wagon Company of Birkenhead, which were numbered 9 to 12, and the locomotives also pulled some of the Eades horse trams, which by this time had been fitted with canvas top covers.

The company opened a second line on 13 January 1883, which was about 2 1/2 miles (4.0 km) long and was not connected to the first line. It began near King Street in Wigan, and terminated at the junction of Market Street and Bridge Street in Hindley, running via Darlington Street, following Manchester Road through Ince, and then running along the Wigan road to reach Market Street. The depot for this line was on Albert Street, which turned off Market Street. For around six months, the trams were hauled by horses, until another four tram locomotives were completed by Wilkinsons. An accident occurred in December 1883, in which someone died, and as a result, the steam locomotives were withdrawn in February 1884, to be replaced by horses. However, the locomotives returned in August, and horses ceased to be used from that time. The locomotive fleet was expanded to twelve by the addition of four more machines from Wilkinsons in 1886–87.

The tramways were not a financial success, and in 1890, a receiver was appointed to manage the company's affairs. The system was eventually taken over by the Wigan and District Tramways Company in 1893, who scrapped all of the passenger vehicles and five of the Wilkinson locomotives. They were replaced by 16 enclosed double-deck bogie cars, whose manufacturer is unknown, two second-hand Wilkinson locomotives obtained from Brighton and Shoreham Tramways, and five new locomotives bought from Kitson and Company of Hunslet, Leeds. The same manufacturer supplied two more locomotives in 1895 and two in 1896.

Meanwhile, Wigan Corporation obtained the Wigan Corporation Act 1893 (56 & 57 Vict. c. clxxxii), which enabled it to build two lines radiating out from the town centre. One ran north-eastwards to Martland Mill, while the second ran from the Tramway Company's line at Darlington Street to Platt Bridge, to the south-east. The new routes were about 4 miles (6.4 km) long in total, but construction did not begin immediately. The Wigan and District Tramways Company responded by obtaining powers of its own, enshrined in the Wigan and District Tramways Order 1895, confirmed by the Tramways Order Confirmation (No. 2) Act 1895 (58 & 59 Vict. c. ci). This authorised them to build connecting links to the as-yet-unbuilt corporation lines and an extension at Platt Bridge. Only the line to Platt Bridge was built, with services beginning on 2 September 1896. The tramway company leased the line to Platt Bridge from the corporation, and a new depot was built close to the Platt Bridge terminus, on Tram Street. The two systems co-existed for a while, but the corporation took over the lines run by the Wigan and District Tramways Company on 30 September 1902.

=== Corporation Tramways ===
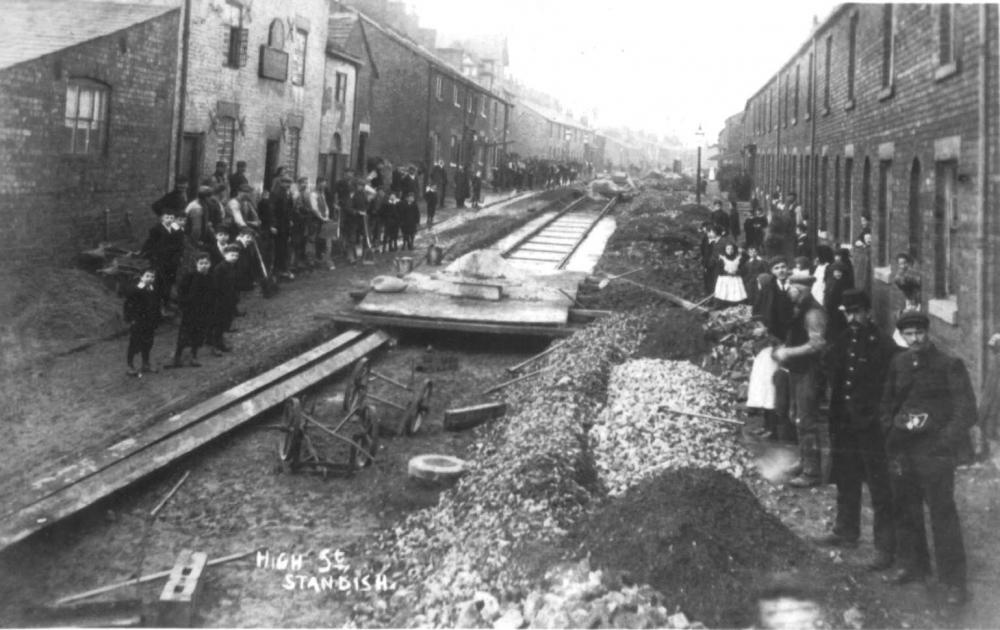
Tram tracks being laid in Standish in 1905

Under the provisions of the Tramways Act 1870 (33 & 34 Vict. c. 78), local authorities such as Wigan Corporation had the right to buy tramways running in their area after a period of 21 years, although it did not give them powers to operate tramways. This hindered the development of many tramways since local authorities only had to pay the scrap value of the assets they were buying, rather than paying for the business as a going concern. The legislation was amended by the Light Railways Act 1896 (59 & 60 Vict. c. 48) which, although it was not intended to apply to street tramways, was nevertheless used to authorise them. More importantly, it and subsequent legislation allowed local authorities to operate the tramways which they owned.

Wigan Corporation obtained the Wigan Corporation Act 1898 (61 & 62 Vict. c. cxxxv), which authorised them to build and operate two electric tramway routes. The first route ran north-eastwards from the town centre to Maitland Bridge, and it used the same 3 ft 6 in (1,067 mm) gauge as the Wigan and District Tramways Company lines. The corporation bought twelve double-deck open-top tramcars from the Electric Railway and Tramway Carriage Works of Preston, and the route opened for passengers in January 1901. A second line opened on 7 June 1901, running northwards along Wigan Lane to the Boars Head public house. Additional trams were bought as more lines opened, and by 1902, the corporation owned 25 passenger vehicles and a works car. Also in 1902, one of the corporation's trams featured in the Mitchell and Kenyon short silent film Living Wigan.

Under the 21 year rule, the corporation bought out the Wigan and District Tramways Company in 1902, although steam trams continued to be run by them on behalf of the new owners until 26 September 1904, when the final steam service ran to Hindley. The corporation decided that all future lines would be constructed to the standard gauge of 4 ft 8 1/2 in (1,435 mm), and that existing lines would be widened. However, the line to Platt Bridge was reconstructed as an electric tramway, which reopened on 29 May 1903, but rather than buy more narrow-gauge tramcars, services were supplied by the steam trams until 2 September 1904, when standard-gauge electric trams took over. The line to Pemberton had been closed on 10 April 1904, and after electrification and regauging, it reopened on 26 July. A batch of 24 single-deck bogie trams were bought from Hurst Nelson of Motherwell, and the first batch of twelve narrow-gauge tramcars were sold for further use on the Coventry Electric Tramways Company system.

Thirty bogie combination cars, with a central saloon and open ends, were bought from the Electric Railway and Tramway Carriage Works in 1904–5, and the fleet was extended again in 1914, by the addition of six double-deck bogie trams with top covers, bought from United Electric Car Company, the successor to the Electric Railway and Tramway Carriage Works. Six similar vehicles were bought from English Electric in 1920, but the final batch of twelve similar trams were built by Massey Brothers of Wigan in Pemberton Depot, using electrical equipment supplied by English Electric. One of them, car 80, was outshopped in a cream livery, for use by wedding parties.

The tramways were never a financial success, so the corporation reviewed working practices and introduced economy measures to try to balance the books. The narrow-gauge tracks and tramcars were in a particularly bad state by the start of the First World War, and on 15 July 1923 the line via New Springs to Aspull was closed to allow it to be regauged. Beyond New Springs, the tramway was outside of the borough boundary, and the trams were replaced by motor buses, while the town section opened in stages as the work was completed, with the final section opening on 23 December 1923. The route to Maitland Mill in the north west, which was the last narrow-gauge line, was replaced by a trolleybus service on 7 May 1925. Most of the Platt Bridge service was replaced by buses from 22 August 1927, although workmen's trams continued to run for another four years. The route out to Ashton-in-Makerfield was the next to go, on 30 November 1930, while on 28 February 1931, the route to Hindley closed and the remaining trams to Platt Bridge were withdrawn. The final two routes, to Standish in the north, which was an extension of the line to Boars Head, and to Abbey Lakes, which was an extension of the line to Pemberton, lasted for just one more month, closing on 28 March 1931.

The corporation did not take advantage of the opportunity to convert all tramways to a single operating gauge, and so for the thirty years of electric tramway operation, there were services operating on 3 ft 6 in (1,067 mm) and 4 ft 8 1/2 in (1,435 mm) gauge tracks. The system also met South Lancashire Tramways at Ashton and Hindley, but the corporation failed to capitalise on the options for through running. Links to that system were created in 1926 at Ashton and 1927 at Hindley, but it was all too late, as parts of the Wigan system had already closed and the South Lancashire system began its four-year closure programme in 1929.

There were depots located at SD 6075 0328 and SD 6037 0246.

=== Trolleybuses ===
After the line to Aspull was regauged in 1923, Wigan Corporation were left with one narrow-gauge tramline, running for 1 1/2 miles (2.4 km) to Martland Mill. The Tramways Committee looked at the economics of converting the final line but found that it could be replaced by trolleybuses for around one-third of the £30,000 that it would cost to regauge the line for trams. Despite reservations that the capacity of the line might be reduced if trolleybuses were used, the changeover was agreed. They bought four vehicles from Clough, Smith, which consisted of a chassis by Straker-Squire of Edmonton, electrical equipment by British Thomson-Houston of Rugby, and a 37-seat single-deck body with a central entrance by Brush Electrical Engineering Company of Loughborough. When they first arrived, they were fitted with solid rubber tyres, but these were replaced by pneumatic tyres in 1929.

At the town centre end of the route, there was a turning circle where Market Street met Woodcock Street, to prevent the trolleybuses from having to turn around in the Market Place. There was another turning circle at Springfield, to accommodate short workings, but at the Martland Mill terminus, the vehicles reversed into Horton Street to turn around. The trolleybuses were stabled in the tram depot at Melverley Street, and to reach the start of their route, one of the trolley poles ran along the tramway wire, and a skate ran along the rails to complete the circuit. On 7 May 1925, there was an opening ceremony at which the chairman of the Tramways Committee drove the first trolleybus, and the trams were replaced by the new vehicles in the afternoon.

During the decision-making process, it was estimated that a 30 hp (22 kW) petrol-engined bus would cost £5,936, and there were fears that they might require larger engines to cope with the hills, whereas a trolleybus would cost £1,075. The Martland Mill route on which they ran had never made a profit when operated by tramcars, despite the fact that it served both a populous mining district and the local football ground. The trolleybuses when bought actually cost £1,635 each, and were equipped with 42 hp (31 kW) motors and a Holden suspension system. This consisted of a channel section bolted to the chassis and another bolted to the bodywork, which fitted together, with an inflatable tube located in the resultant box section, to give air suspension. Although the tramways as a whole made an operating profit of £16,000 per year, the Maitland Mill tram route lost 2 pence per car mile. The cost of installing the trolleybus system was £8,305, and with estimated running costs of £5,911 per year, the corporation were convinced that they would pay their way. Fares were maintained at the same level as they had been on the trams.

In 1930, the corporation considered converting the tram routes to Ashton, Hindley, Orrell and Standish but decided against the idea. By early 1931, the tram service had ceased and been replaced by motor buses, but the tram tracks to the start of the trolleybus route had to be retained to allow the trolleybuses to access the depot. Rather than convert the depot section to dual wire, the service was discontinued on 30 September. Wigan Corporation never obtained legal authority to run trolleybuses, and although they considered obtaining a local act of Parliament, they did not actually do so.

== Fleet ==
Wigan and District Tramways owned a total of eight double-deck horse trams, 23 steam locomotives and 20 double-deck trailers for use with the locomotives.

Narrow-gauge horse and steam trams 3 ft 6 in (1,067 mm)

Car numbers	Type	Year built	Builder	Notes
1–8	Double-deck Eades truck	1880	Ashbury	Horse trams. Scrapped 1893
1–4	Steam tram locomotive	1881	Wilkinson	Scrapped 1893
9–12	Double-deck top-covered trailer	1881	Starbuck	Scrapped 1893
5–8	Steam tram locomotive	1883	Wilkinson	Renumbered 1–4 in 1893
9–12	Steam tram locomotive	1886–87	Wilkinson	No. 9 scrapped 1893. 10–12 renumbered 7–9 in 1893
1–16	Double-deck enclosed bogie trailer	1893	unknown	
5–6	Steam tram locomotive	1884	Wilkinson	Bought from Brighton & Shoreham in 1893
10–14	Steam tram locomotive	1893	Kitson	
15–16	Steam tram locomotive	1895	Kitson	
17–18	Steam tram locomotive	1896	Kitson	

Wigan Corporation owned a total of 54 single-deck and 49 double-deck tramcars during the life of the system.

Narrow-gauge electric trams 3 ft 6 in (1,067 mm)

Car numbers	Type	Year built	Builder	Notes
1–12	Double-deck open-top car	1900	ERTCW	Sold to Coventy 1904
13–24	Double-deck open-top car	1901	ERTCW	
25	Works car	1902	ERTCW	
26	Double-deck open-top bogie car	1902	ERTCW	

Standard-gauge electric trams 4 ft 8 1/2 in (1,435 mm)

Car numbers	Type	Year built	Builder	Notes
27–50	Single-deck bogie car	1904	Hurst Nelson	
51–80	Single-deck bogie combination car	1904–05	ERTCW	Covered central saloon with open ends
1–6	Double-deck top-covered bogie car	1914	United Electric	
7–12	Double-deck top-covered car	1920	English Electric	
81–92	Double-deck top-covered car	1921–22	Massey Brothers / English Electric	Built in Pemberton Works

Trolleybuses

Car numbers	Type	In service	Withdrawn	Chassis	Electrical equipment	Bodywork
1–4	Single-deck two-axle	1925	1931	Straker Squire	British Thomson-Houston	Brush B37C

Bus bodywork designations: key
Prefixes

U	Wartime utility bodywork
B	Bus body single deck
C	Coach body single deck
D	Dual purpose single deck
H	Highbridge body, central upper gangway
L	Lowbridge body, offset sunken upper gangway

Numbers

n	Single deck or total seating
x / y	Upper deck followed by lower deck seating

Suffixes

C	Centre entrance
F	Front entrance
R	Rear entrance
D	Dual entrance

== Bibliography ==
- Joyce, J; King, J S; Newman, G (1986). British Trolleybus Systems. Ian Allan. ISBN 978-0-7110-1647-7.
- Klapper, Charles (1974). The Golden Age of Tramways (2nd ed.). David & Charles. ISBN 978-0-7153-6458-1.
- Stretch, E K (1978). The Tramways of Wigan. Manchester Transport Museum Society. ISBN 978-0-900857-15-7.
- Turner, Keith (1996). The Directory of British Tramways. Patrick Stephens. ISBN 978-1-85260-549-0.
