= Western (genre) =

Multimedia genre

The Western is a genre of fiction typically set in the American frontier, commonly referred to as the “Old West” or “Wild West”. Stories in the genre are most commonly set during the period of westward expansion in the 19th century, particularly from the mid-19th century (around the time of the California Gold Rush) through the closing of the American frontier in 1890, although works may be set outside this period. The American Film Institute’s definition of the Western focuses on the American West and the “spirit, struggle, and demise” of the frontier rather than imposing exact dates. The genre is commonly associated with folk tales of the Western United States, particularly the Southwestern United States, as well as Northern Mexico and Western Canada.

The frontier is depicted in Western fiction as a sparsely populated, often lawless region inhabited by cowboys, outlaws, sheriffs, gunslingers, settlers, soldiers, and Native Americans. Western narratives frequently concern the settlement and transformation of the American West, exploring themes such as justice, freedom, rugged individualism, manifest destiny, conflict between civilization and wilderness, and the national identity of the United States. In many traditional Westerns, Native Americans were portrayed as averse foes, savages, or through stereotypical depictions, although later works increasingly presented more nuanced and sympathetic portrayals.

Originating in vaquero heritage and Western fiction, the genre popularized the Western lifestyle, country-Western music, and Western wear globally. Throughout the history of the genre, it has seen popular revivals and been incorporated into various subgenres.

== Characteristics ==
=== Stories and characters ===
The classic Western is a morality drama, presenting the conflict between wilderness and civilization. Stories commonly center on the life of a male drifter, cowboy, or gunslinger who rides a horse and is armed with a revolver or rifle. The male characters typically wear broad-brimmed and high-crowned Stetson hats, neckerchief bandannas, vests, and cowboy boots with spurs. While many wear conventional shirts and trousers, alternatives include buckskins and dusters.

Women are generally cast in secondary roles as love interests for the male lead; or in supporting roles as saloon girls, prostitutes or as the wives of pioneers and settlers. The wife character often provides a measure of comic relief. The wife character may also add to the plot by building conflict between the hero and villain. Other recurring characters include Native Americans of various tribes described as Indians or Red Indians, African Americans, Chinese Americans, Spaniards, Mexicans, law enforcement officers, bounty hunters, outlaws, bartenders, merchants, gamblers, soldiers (especially mounted cavalry), and settlers (farmers, ranchers, and townsfolk).

The ambience is usually punctuated with a Western music score, including American folk music and Spanish/Mexican folk music such as country, Native American music, New Mexico music, and rancheras.

=== Locations ===
Westerns often stress the harshness of the wilderness and frequently set the action in an arid, desolate landscape of deserts and mountains. Often, the vast landscape plays an important role, presenting a "mythic vision of the plains and deserts of the American West". Specific settings include ranches, small frontier towns, saloons, railways, wilderness, and isolated military forts of the Wild West. Many Westerns use a stock plot of depicting a crime, then showing the pursuit of the wrongdoer, ending in revenge and retribution, which is often dispensed through a shootout or quick draw duel.

=== Themes ===
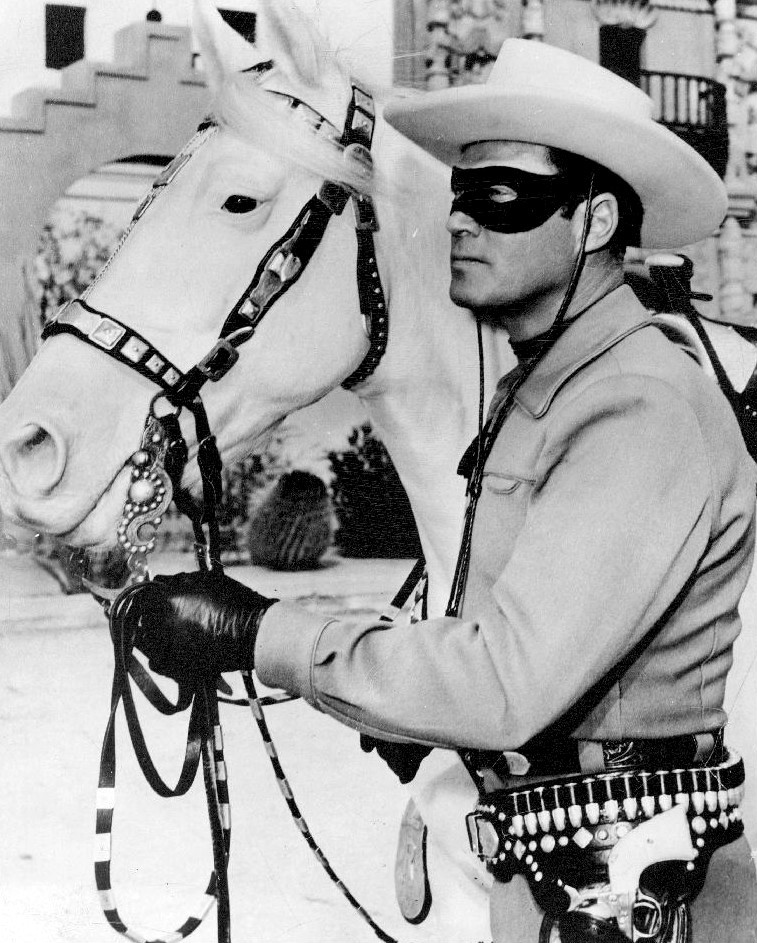
The Lone Ranger, a famous heroic lawman, was with a cavalry of six Texas Rangers until they all, except for him, were killed. He preferred to remain anonymous, so he resigned and built a sixth grave that supposedly held his body. He fights on as a lawman, wearing a mask, for "Outlaws live in a world of fear. Fear of the mysterious".

The Western genre sometimes portrays the conquest of the wilderness and the subordination of nature in the name of civilization or the confiscation of the territorial rights of the original, Native American, inhabitants of the frontier. The Western depicts a society organized around codes of honor and personal, direct or private justice—"frontier justice"—dispensed by gunfights. These honor codes are often played out through depictions of feuds or individuals seeking personal revenge or retribution against someone who has wronged them (e.g., True Grit has revenge and retribution as its main themes). This Western depiction of personal justice contrasts sharply with justice systems organized around rationalistic, abstract law that exist in cities, in which social order is maintained predominantly through relatively impersonal institutions such as courtrooms. The popular perception of the Western is a story that centers on the life of a seminomadic wanderer, usually a cowboy or a gunfighter. A showdown or duel at high noon featuring two or more gunfighters is a stereotypical scene in the popular conception of Westerns. The showdown in High Noon is an excellent example of this.

In some ways, such protagonists may be considered the literary descendants of the knights-errant, who stood at the center of earlier extensive genres such as the Arthurian romances. Like the cowboy or gunfighter of the Western, the knight-errant of the earlier European tales and poetry was wandering from place to place on his horse, fighting villains of various kinds, and bound to no fixed social structures, but only to his own innate code of honor. Like knights-errant, the heroes of Westerns frequently rescue damsels in distress. Similarly, the wandering protagonists of Westerns share many characteristics with the ronin in modern Japanese culture.

The Western typically takes these elements and uses them to tell simple morality tales, although some notable examples (e.g. the later Westerns of John Ford or Clint Eastwood's Unforgiven, about an old contract killer) are more morally ambiguous. Westerns often stress the harshness and isolation of the wilderness, and frequently set the action in an arid, desolate landscape. Western films generally have specific settings, such as isolated ranches, Native American villages, or small frontier towns with a saloon. Oftentimes, these settings appear deserted and without much structure. Apart from the wilderness, the saloon usually emphasizes that this is the Wild West; it is the place to go for music (raucous piano playing), women (often prostitutes), gambling (draw poker or five-card stud), drinking (beer, whiskey, or tequila if set in Mexico), brawling, and shooting. In some Westerns, where civilization has arrived, the town has a church, a general store, a bank, and a school; in others, where frontier rules still hold sway, it is, as Sergio Leone said, "where life has no value".

=== Plots ===
Author and screenwriter Frank Gruber identified seven basic plots for Westerns:

- Union Pacific story: The plot concerns construction of a railroad, a telegraph line, or some other type of modern technology on the wild frontier. Wagon-train stories fall into this category.
- Ranch story: Ranchers protecting their family ranch from rustlers or large landowners attempting to force out the proper owners.
- Empire story: The plot involves building a ranch empire or an oil empire from scratch, a classic rags-to-riches plot, often involving conflict over resources such as water or minerals.
- Revenge story: The plot often involves an elaborate chase and pursuit by a wronged individual, but it may also include elements of the classic mystery story.
- Cavalry and Indian story: The plot revolves around taming the wilderness for White settlers or fighting Native Americans.
- Outlaw story: The outlaw gangs dominate the action.
- Marshal story: The lawman and his challenges drive the plot.

Gruber noted that good writers use dialogue and plot development to expand these basic plots into believable stories.

== Media ==
=== Film ===
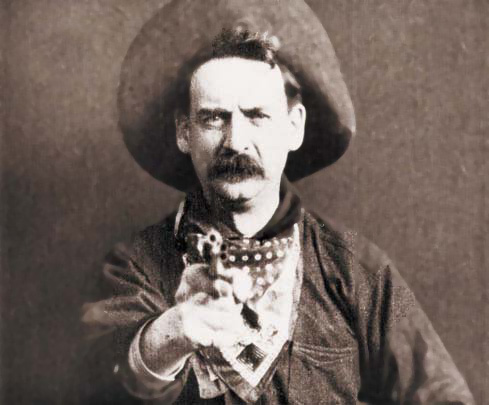
Justus D. Barnes, in Western apparel, from the silent film The Great Train Robbery (1903), the second Western film and the first one shot in the United States

The Great Train Robbery full film (1903); runtime 00:11:51.

The American Film Institute defines Western films as those "set in the American West that [embody] the spirit, the struggle, and the demise of the new frontier". Originally, these films were called "Wild West dramas", a reference to Wild West shows like Buffalo Bill Cody's. The term "Western", used to describe a narrative film genre, appears to have originated with a July 1912 article in Motion Picture World magazine.

Most of the characteristics of Western films were part of 19th-century popular Western fiction, and were firmly in place before film became a popular art form. Western films commonly feature protagonists such as cowboys, gunslingers, and bounty hunters, who are often depicted as seminomadic wanderers who wear Stetson hats, bandannas, spurs, and buckskins, use revolvers or rifles as everyday tools of survival and as a means to settle disputes using frontier justice. Protagonists ride between dusty towns and cattle ranches on their trusty steeds.

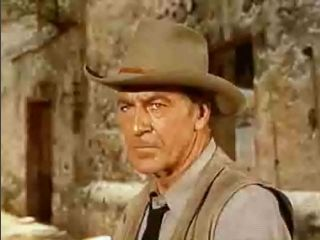
Gary Cooper in Vera Cruz

The first films that belong to the Western genre are a series of short single reel silents made in 1894 by Edison Studios at their Black Maria studio in West Orange, New Jersey. These featured veterans of Buffalo Bill's Wild West show exhibiting skills acquired by living in the Old West – they included Annie Oakley (shooting) and members of the Sioux (dancing).

The earliest known Western narrative film is the British short Kidnapping by Indians, made by Mitchell and Kenyon in Blackburn, England, in 1899. The Great Train Robbery (1903, based on the earlier British film A Daring Daylight Burglary), Edwin S. Porter's film starring Broncho Billy Anderson, is often erroneously cited as the first Western, though George N. Fenin and William K. Everson point out (as mentioned above) that the "Edison company had played with Western material for several years prior to The Great Train Robbery". Nonetheless, they concur that Porter's film "set the pattern—of crime, pursuit, and retribution—for the Western film as a genre". The film's popularity opened the door for Anderson to become the screen's first Western star; he made several hundred Western film shorts. So popular was the genre that he soon faced competition from Tom Mix and William S. Hart.

Western films were enormously popular in the silent film era (1894–1927). With the advent of sound in 1927–1928, the major Hollywood studios rapidly abandoned Westerns, leaving the genre to smaller studios and producers. These smaller organizations churned out countless low-budget features and serials in the 1930s. An exception was The Big Trail, a 1930 American pre-Code widescreen Western film shot on location across the American West, including the Grand Canyon, Yosemite, and the giant redwoods, starring 23-year-old John Wayne in his first leading role and directed by Raoul Walsh. The epic film noted for its authenticity was a financial failure due in part to exhibitors' inability to switch over to widescreen during the Great Depression.

By the late 1930s, the Western film was widely regarded as a pulp genre in Hollywood, but its popularity was dramatically revived in 1939 by major studio productions such as Dodge City starring Errol Flynn, Jesse James with Tyrone Power, Union Pacific with Joel McCrea, Destry Rides Again featuring James Stewart and Marlene Dietrich, and especially John Ford's landmark Western adventure Stagecoach starring John Wayne, which became one of the biggest hits of the year. Released through United Artists, Stagecoach made John Wayne a mainstream screen star in the wake of a decade of headlining B Westerns. After renewed commercial successes in the late 1930s, the popularity of Westerns continued to rise until its peak in the 1950s, when the number of Western films produced outnumbered all other genres combined.

The period from 1940 to 1960 has been called the "Golden Age of the Western". It is epitomized by the work of several prominent directors including Robert Aldrich, Budd Boetticher, Delmer Daves, John Ford, and others. Some of the popular films during this era include Apache (1954), Broken Arrow (1950), and My Darling Clementine (1946).

The changing popularity of the Western genre has influenced worldwide pop culture over time. During the 1960s and 1970s, Spaghetti Westerns from Italy became popular worldwide; this was due to the success of Sergio Leone's storytelling method. After having been previously pronounced dead, a resurgence of Westerns occurred during the 1990s with films such as Dances with Wolves (1990), Unforgiven (1992), and Geronimo: An American Legend (1993), as Westerns once again increased in popularity.

=== Television ===
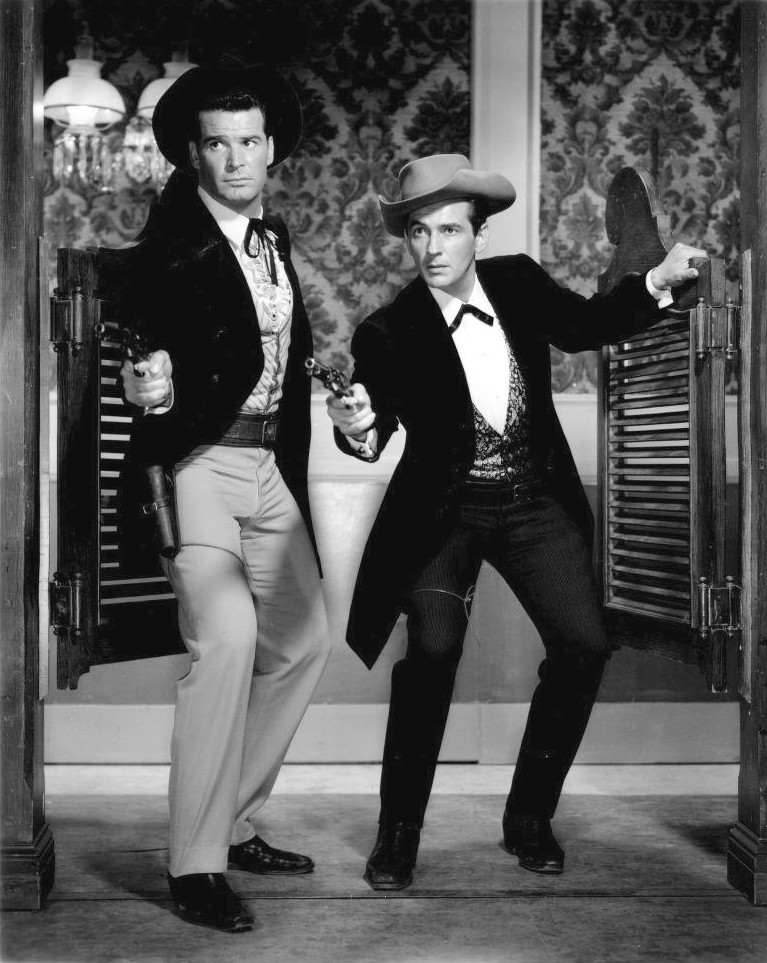
James Garner and Jack Kelly in Maverick (1957)

When television became popular in the late 1940s and 1950s, television Westerns quickly became an audience favorite. Beginning with rebroadcasts of existing films, a number of movie cowboys had their own TV shows. As demand for the Western increased, new stories and stars were introduced. A number of long-running TV Westerns became classics in their own right, such as: The Cisco Kid (1950–1956), The Lone Ranger (1949–1957), Death Valley Days (1952–1970), The Life and Legend of Wyatt Earp (1955–1961), Cheyenne (1955–1962), Gunsmoke (1955–1975), Maverick (1957–1962), Have Gun – Will Travel (1957–1963), Wagon Train (1957–1965), The Rifleman (1958–1963), Rawhide (1959–1966), Bonanza (1959–1973), The Virginian (1962–1971), and The Big Valley (1965–1969). The Life and Legend of Wyatt Earp was the first Western television series written for adults, premiering four days before Gunsmoke on September 6, 1955.

The peak year for television Westerns was 1959, with 26 such shows airing during primetime. At least six of them were connected in some extent to Wyatt Earp: The Life and Legend of Wyatt Earp, Bat Masterson, Tombstone Territory, Broken Arrow, Johnny Ringo, and Gunsmoke. Increasing costs of American television production weeded out most action half-hour series in the early 1960s, and their replacement by hour-long television shows, increasingly in color. Traditional Westerns died out in the late 1960s as a result of network changes in demographic targeting along with pressure from parental television groups. Future entries in the genre would incorporate elements from other genera, such as crime drama and mystery whodunit elements. Western shows from the 1970s included Hec Ramsey, Kung Fu, Little House on the Prairie, McCloud, The Life and Times of Grizzly Adams, and the short-lived but highly acclaimed How the West Was Won that originated from a miniseries with the same name. In the 1990s and 2000s, hour-long Westerns and slickly packaged made-for-TV movie Westerns were introduced, such as Lonesome Dove (1989) and Dr. Quinn, Medicine Woman. Also, new elements were once again added to the Western formula, such as the space Western, Firefly, created by Joss Whedon in 2002. Deadwood was a critically acclaimed Western series that aired on HBO from 2004 through 2006. Hell on Wheels, a fictionalized story of the construction of the first transcontinental railroad, aired on AMC for five seasons between 2011 and 2016. Longmire is a Western series that centered on Walt Longmire, a sheriff in fictional Absaroka County, Wyoming. Originally aired on the A&E network from 2012 to 2014, it was picked up by Netflix in 2015 until the show's conclusion in 2017.

AMC and Vince Gilligan's critically acclaimed Breaking Bad is a much more modern take on the Western genre. Set in New Mexico, it follows Walter White (Bryan Cranston), a chemistry teacher diagnosed with Stage III Lung Cancer who cooks and sells crystal meth to provide money for his family after he dies, while slowly growing further and further into the illicit drug market, eventually turning into a ruthless drug dealer and killer. While the show has scenes in a populated suburban neighborhood and nearby Albuquerque, much of the show takes place in the desert, where Walter often takes his RV car out into the open desert to cook his meth, and most action sequences occur in the desert, similar to old-fashioned Western movies. The clash between the Wild West and modern technology like cars and cellphones, while also focusing primarily on being a crime drama makes the show a unique spin on both genres. Walter's reliance on the desert environment makes the Western-feel a pivotal role in the show, and would continue to be used in the spinoff series Better Call Saul.

The neo-Western drama Yellowstone was streamed from 2018–2024.

=== Literature ===
Western fiction is a genre of literature set in the American Old West, most commonly between 1860 and 1900. The first critically recognized Western was The Virginian (1902) by Owen Wister. Other well-known writers of Western fiction include Zane Grey, from the early 1900s, Ernest Haycox, Luke Short, and Louis L'Amour, from the mid 20th century. Many writers better known in other genres, such as Leigh Brackett, Elmore Leonard, and Larry McMurtry, have also written Western novels. The genre's popularity peaked in the 1960s, due in part to the shuttering of many pulp magazines, the popularity of televised Westerns, and the rise of the spy novel. Readership began to drop off in the mid- to late 1970s and reached a new low in the 2000s. Most bookstores, outside of a few Western states, now only carry a small number of Western novels and short-story collections.

Literary forms that share similar themes include stories of the American frontier, the gaucho literature of Argentina, and tales of the settlement of the Australian Outback.

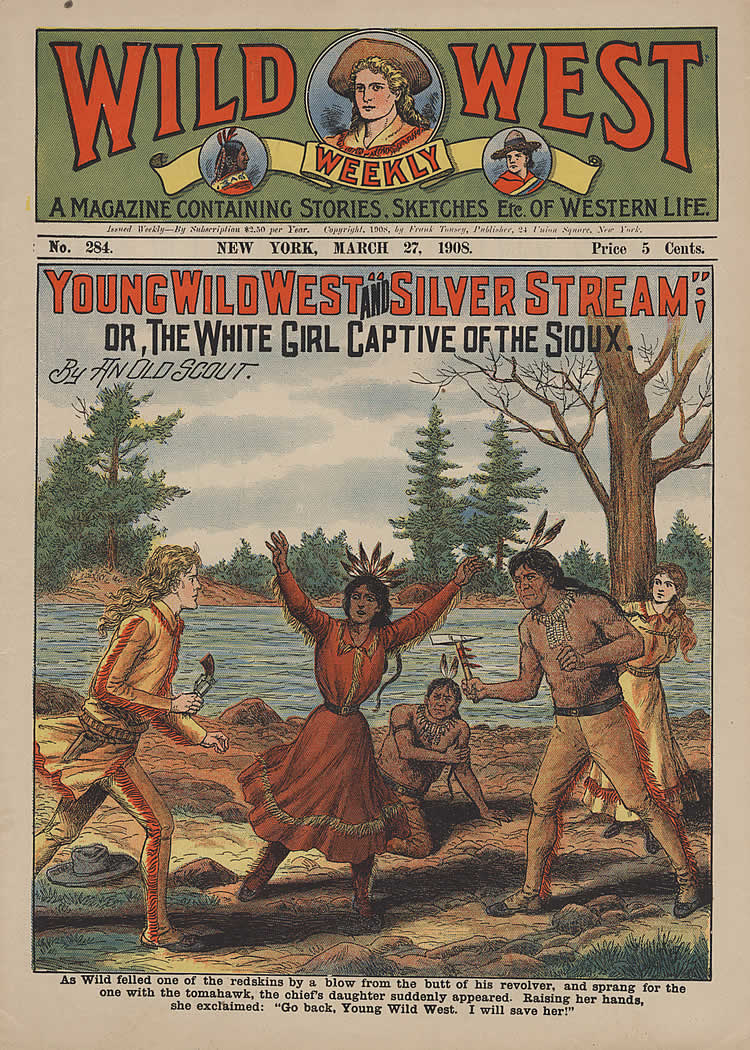
"As Wild felled one of the redskins by a blow from the butt of his revolver, and sprang for the one with the tomahawk, the chief's daughter suddenly appeared. Raising her hands, she exclaimed, 'Go back, Young Wild West. I will save her!'" (1908)

=== Visual arts ===
A number of visual artists focused their work on representations of the American Old West. American West-oriented art is sometimes referred to as "Western Art" by Americans. This relatively new category of art includes paintings, sculptures, and sometimes Native American crafts. Initially, subjects included exploration of the Western states and cowboy themes. Frederic Remington and Charles M. Russell are two artists who captured the "Wild West" in paintings and sculpture. After the death of Remington Richard Lorenz became the preeminent artist painting in the Western genre.

Some art museums, such as the Buffalo Bill Center of the West in Wyoming and the Autry National Center in Los Angeles, feature American Western Art.

=== Anime and manga ===
With anime and manga, the genre tends towards the science-fiction Western – e.g., Cowboy Bebop (1998 anime), Trigun (1995–2007 manga), and Outlaw Star (1996–1999 manga). Although contemporary Westerns also appear, such as Koya no Shonen Isamu, a 1971 shonen manga about a boy with a Japanese father and a Native American mother, or El Cazador de la Bruja, a 2007 anime television series set in modern-day Mexico. Part 7 of the manga series JoJo's Bizarre Adventure is based in the American Western setting. The story follows racers in a transcontinental horse race, the "Steel Ball Run". Golden Kamuy (2014–2022) shifts its setting to the fallout of the Russo-Japanese War, specifically focusing on Hokkaido and Sakhalin as a lawless frontier environment similar to the Wild West, and featuring the Ainu people and other local tribes instead of Native Americans, as well other recognizable Western tropes.

=== Comics ===
Western comics have included serious entries, such as the classic comics of the late 1940s and early 1950s (namely Kid Colt, Outlaw, Rawhide Kid, and Red Ryder) or more modern ones (such as Tex Willer and Blueberry), cartoons, and parodies (such as Lucky Luke and Cocco Bill). In the 1990s and 2000s, Western comics leaned towards the fantasy, horror and science fiction genres, usually involving supernatural monsters, or Christian iconography as in Preacher. More traditional Western comics are found throughout this period, though (e.g., Jonah Hex and Loveless).

=== Video games ===
Video game Westerns emerged in the 1970s. These games drew on the imagery of a mythic West portrayed in stories, films, television shows, and other assorted Western-themed toys.

When game developers went to the imaginary West to create new experiences, they often drew consciously or unconsciously from Western stories and films. The 1971 text-based, Mainframe computer game The Oregon Trail was first game to use the West as a setting, where it tasked players to lead a party of settlers moving westward in a covered wagon from Independence, Missouri to Oregon City, Oregon. The game only grew popular in the 1980s and 1990s as an educational game. The first video game Westerns to engage the mass public arrived in arcade games focused on the gunfighter in Westerns based on depictions in television shows, films and Electro-mechanical games such as Dale Six Shooter (1950), and Sega's Gun Fight (1970). The first of these games was Midway's Gun Fight, an adaptation of Taito's Western Gun (1975) which featured two players against each other in a duel set on a sparse desert landscape with a few cacti and a moving covered wagon to hide behind. Atari's Outlaw (1976) followed which explicitly framed the shootouts between "good guys" and "outlaws" also borrowing from gunfighter themes and imagery. Early console games such as Outlaw (1978) for the Atari 2600 and Gun Fight (1978) for the Bally Astrocade were derivative of Midway's Gun Fight. These early video games featured limited graphical capabilities, which had developers create Westerns to the most easily recognizable and popular tropes of the gunfighter shootouts.

Rockstar Games' Western-themed game Red Dead Redemption 2 (2018) had sold over 64 million copies by 2025, making it one of the best-selling video games of all time.

=== Radio dramas ===
Western radio dramas were very popular from the 1930s to the 1960s. There were five types of Western radio dramas during this period: anthology programs, such as Empire Builders and Frontier Fighters; juvenile adventure programs such as Red Ryder and Hopalong Cassidy; legend and lore like Red Goose Indian Tales and Cowboy Tom's Round-Up; adult Westerns like Fort Laramie and Frontier Gentleman; and soap operas such as Cactus Kate. Some popular shows include The Lone Ranger (first broadcast in 1933), The Cisco Kid (first broadcast in 1942), Dr. Sixgun (first broadcast in 1954), Have Gun–Will Travel (first broadcast in 1958), and Gunsmoke (first broadcast in 1952). Many shows were done live, while others were transcribed.

=== Web series ===
Westerns have been showcased in short-episodic web series. Examples include League of STEAM, Red Bird, and Arkansas Traveler.

== Subgenres ==
Within the larger scope of the Western genre, there are several recognized subgenres. Some subgenres, such as spaghetti Westerns, maintain standard Western settings and plots, while others take the Western theme and archetypes into different supergenres, such as neo-Westerns or space Westerns. For a time, Westerns made in countries other than the United States were often labeled by foods associated with the culture, such as spaghetti Westerns (Italy), meat pie Westerns (Australia), ramen Westerns (Asia), and masala Westerns (India).

== Influence on other genres ==
Being period drama pieces, both the Western and samurai genre influenced each other in style and themes throughout the years. The Magnificent Seven was a remake of Akira Kurosawa's film Seven Samurai, and A Fistful of Dollars was a remake of Kurosawa's Yojimbo, which itself was inspired by Red Harvest, an American detective novel by Dashiell Hammett. Kurosawa was influenced by American Westerns and was a fan of the genre, most especially John Ford.

Despite the Cold War, the Western was a strong influence on Eastern Bloc cinema, which had its own take on the genre, the so-called Red Western or Ostern. Generally, these took two forms: either straight Westerns shot in the Eastern Bloc, or action films involving the Russian Revolution, the Russian Civil War, and the Basmachi rebellion.

Many elements of space-travel series and films borrow extensively from the conventions of the Western genre. This is particularly the case in the space Western subgenre of science fiction. Peter Hyams's Outland transferred the plot of High Noon to Io, moon of Jupiter. More recently, the space opera series Firefly used an explicitly Western theme for its portrayal of frontier worlds. Anime shows such as Cowboy Bebop, Trigun and Outlaw Star have been similar mixes of science-fiction and Western elements. The science fiction Western can be seen as a subgenre of either Westerns or science fiction. Elements of Western films can be found also in some films belonging essentially to other genres. For example, Kelly's Heroes is a war film, but its action and characters are Western-like.

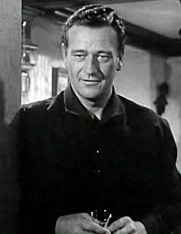
John Wayne (1948)

The character played by Humphrey Bogart in noir films such as Casablanca and To Have and Have Not—an individual bound only by his own private code of honor—has a lot in common with the classic Western hero. In turn, the Western has also explored noir elements, as with films such as Colorado Territory and Pursued.

In many of Robert A. Heinlein's books, the settlement of other planets is depicted in ways explicitly modeled on American settlement of the West. For example, in his Tunnel in the Sky, settlers set out to the planet New Canaan, via an interstellar teleporter portal across the galaxy, in Conestoga wagons, their captain sporting mustaches and a little goatee and riding a Palomino horse—with Heinlein explaining that the colonists would need to survive on their own for some years, so horses are more practical than machines.

Stephen King's The Dark Tower is a series of seven books that meshes themes of Westerns, high fantasy, science fiction, and horror. The protagonist Roland Deschain is a gunslinger whose image and personality are largely inspired by the Man with No Name from Sergio Leone's films. In addition, the superhero fantasy genre has been described as having been derived from the cowboy hero, only powered up to omnipotence in a primarily urban setting.

The Western genre has been parodied on a number of occasions, famous examples being Support Your Local Sheriff!, Cat Ballou, Mel Brooks's Blazing Saddles, and Rustler's Rhapsody.

George Lucas's Star Wars films use many elements of a Western, and Lucas has said he intended for Star Wars to revitalize cinematic mythology, a part the Western once held. The Jedi, who take their name from Jidaigeki, are modeled after samurai, showing the influence of Kurosawa. The character Han Solo dressed like an archetypal gunslinger, and the Mos Eisley cantina is much like an Old West saloon.

Meanwhile, films such as The Big Lebowski, which plucked actor Sam Elliott out of the Old West and into a Los Angeles bowling alley, and Midnight Cowboy, about a Southern-boy-turned-gigolo in New York (who disappoints a client when he does not measure up to Gary Cooper), transplanted Western themes into modern settings for both purposes of parody and homage.

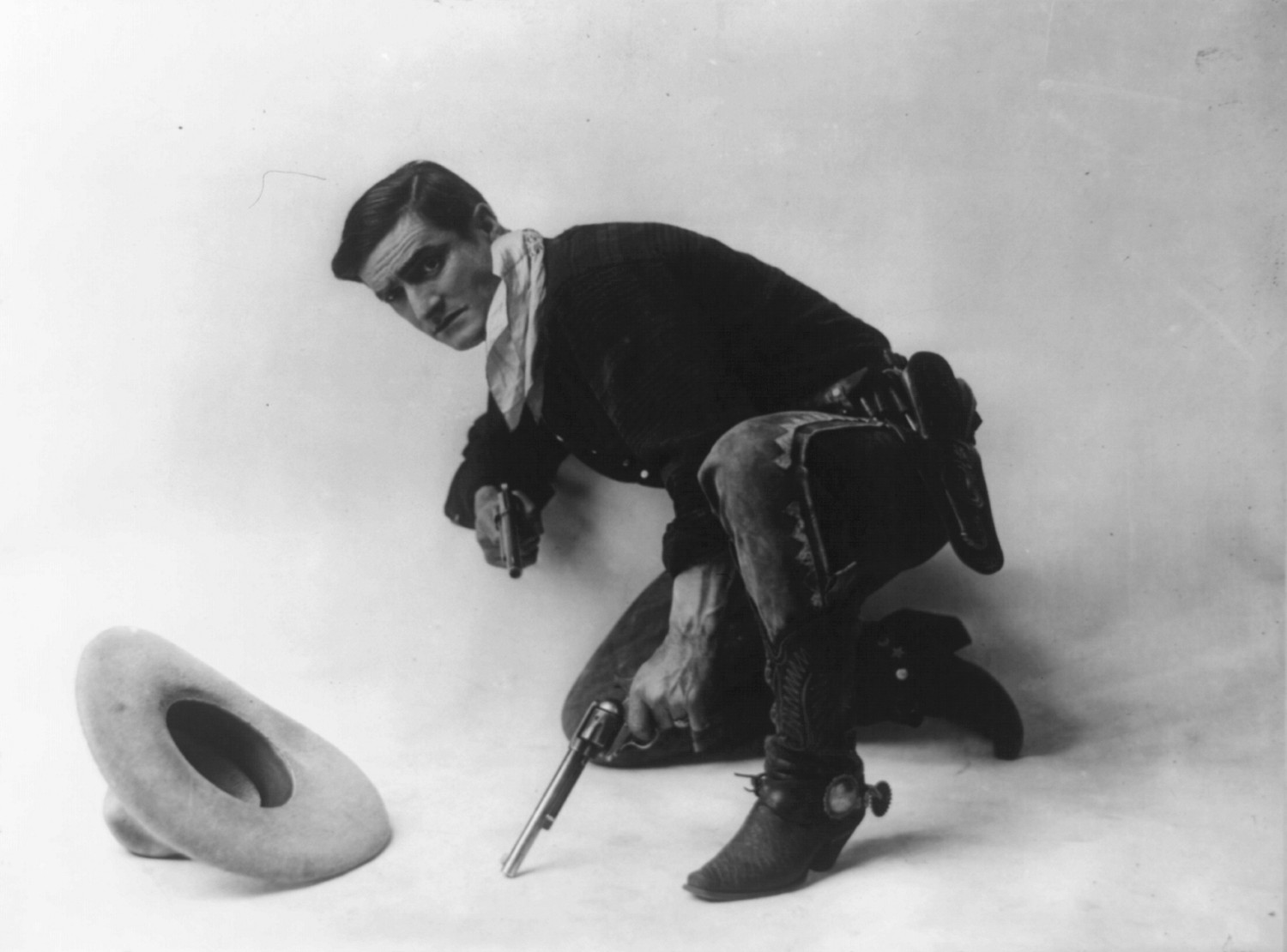
Tom Mix in Mr. Logan, U.S.A., c. 1919

== See also ==
- Dime Western
- List of Western computer and video games
- List of Western fiction authors
- Lists of Western films
- List of Western television series
