= Charles Ward (VC) =

Recipient of the Victoria Cross

Charles Ward VC
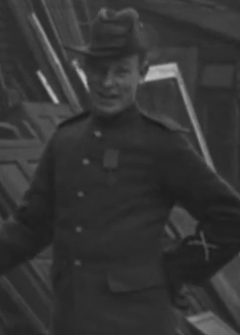
- Charles Ward, during an interview in 1901
- Born: 10 July 1877; Leeds, West Yorkshire
- Died: 30 December 1921 (aged 44); Bridgend, Glamorgan
- Burial place: St Mary's Churchyard, Cardiff
- Military career
- Allegiance: United Kingdom
- Branch: British Army
- Rank: Company sergeant major
- Units: The King's Own Yorkshire Light Infantry
- Conflicts: Second Boer War; First World War
- Awards: Victoria Cross

Charles Burley Ward, VC (10 July 1877 – 30 December 1921) was a British Army soldier and a recipient of the Victoria Cross, the highest award for gallantry in the face of the enemy that can be awarded to British and Commonwealth forces.

== Victoria Cross ==
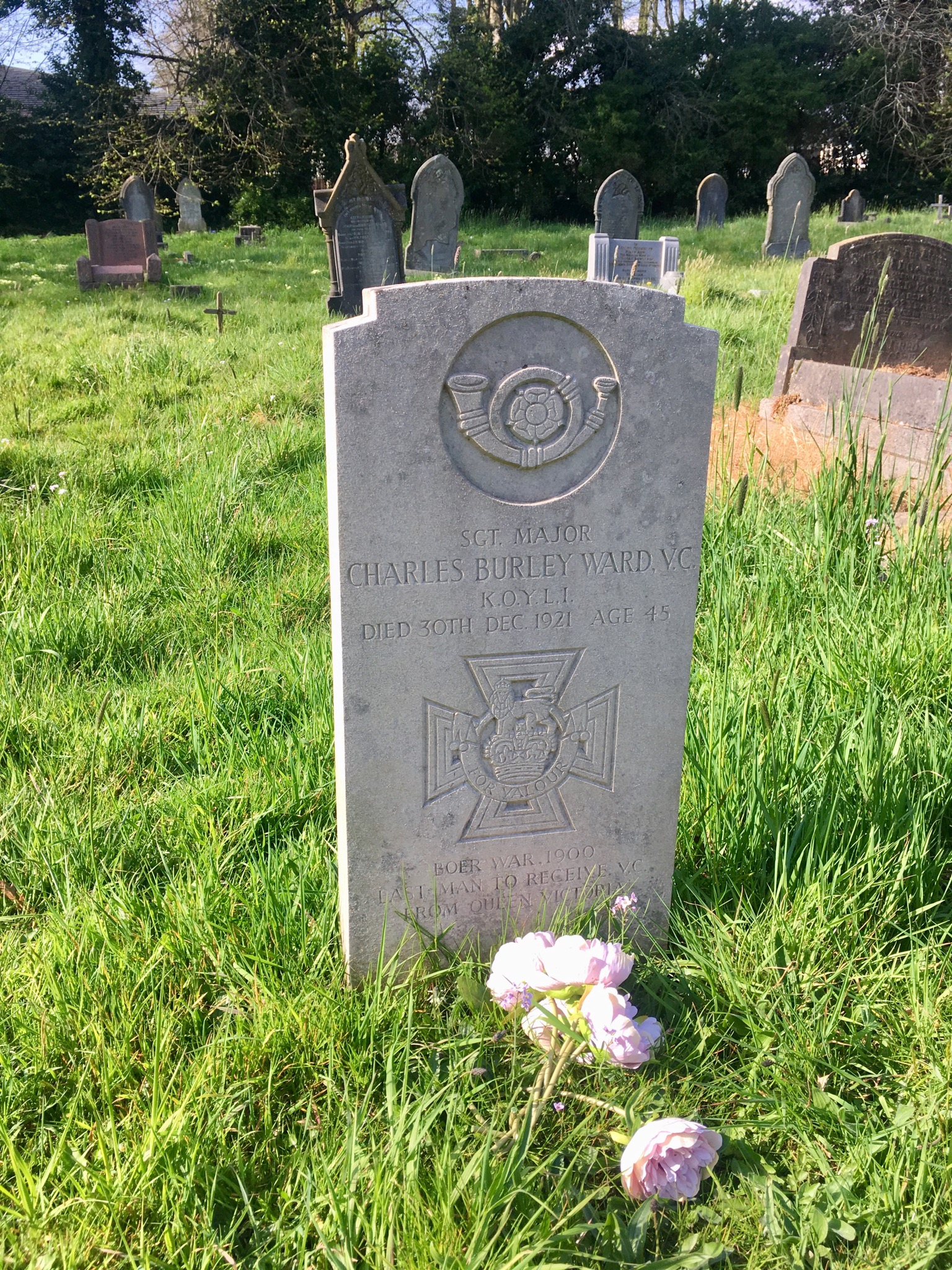
The gravestone of Charles Burley Ward in St Mary's Church, Whitchurch

Ward was 22 years old, and a private in the 2nd Battalion, The King's Own Yorkshire Light Infantry, British Army during the Second Boer War when the following deed took place for which he was awarded the Victoria Cross (VC):

On the 26th June, 1900, at Lindley, a picquet of the Yorkshire Light Infantry was surrounded on three sides by about 500 Boers, at close quarters. The two Officers were wounded and all but six of their men were killed or wounded. Private Ward then volunteered to take a message asking for reinforcements to the Signalling Station about 150 yards in the rear of the post. His offer was at first refused owing to the practical certainty of his being shot; but, on his insisting, he was allowed to go. He got across untouched through a storm of shots from each flank, and, having delivered his message, he voluntarily returned from a place of absolute safety, and recrossed the fire-swept ground to assure his Commanding Officer that the message had been sent. On this occasion he was severely wounded. But for this gallant action the post would certainly have been captured.

== Further information ==
Silent film of Private Ward (right) being interviewed by Ralph Pringle in 1901

Ward was the last recipient of the VC to be decorated by Queen Victoria and later achieved the rank of company sergeant major.

Born in Leeds, Yorkshire, he died at Bridgend, Glamorgan and is buried in St Mary's Churchyard, Whitchurch, Cardiff.

A (silent) movie interview with Ward following his award of the VC was filmed by the Lancashire cinematographers Sagar Mitchell and James Kenyon; sealed in steel barrels after their company went out of business in the 1920s, the 800 films of their archive were discovered during demolition work in 1994, and have now been restored by the British Film Institute.
