= Employees Leaving Messrs Vickers and Maxim's in Barrow =

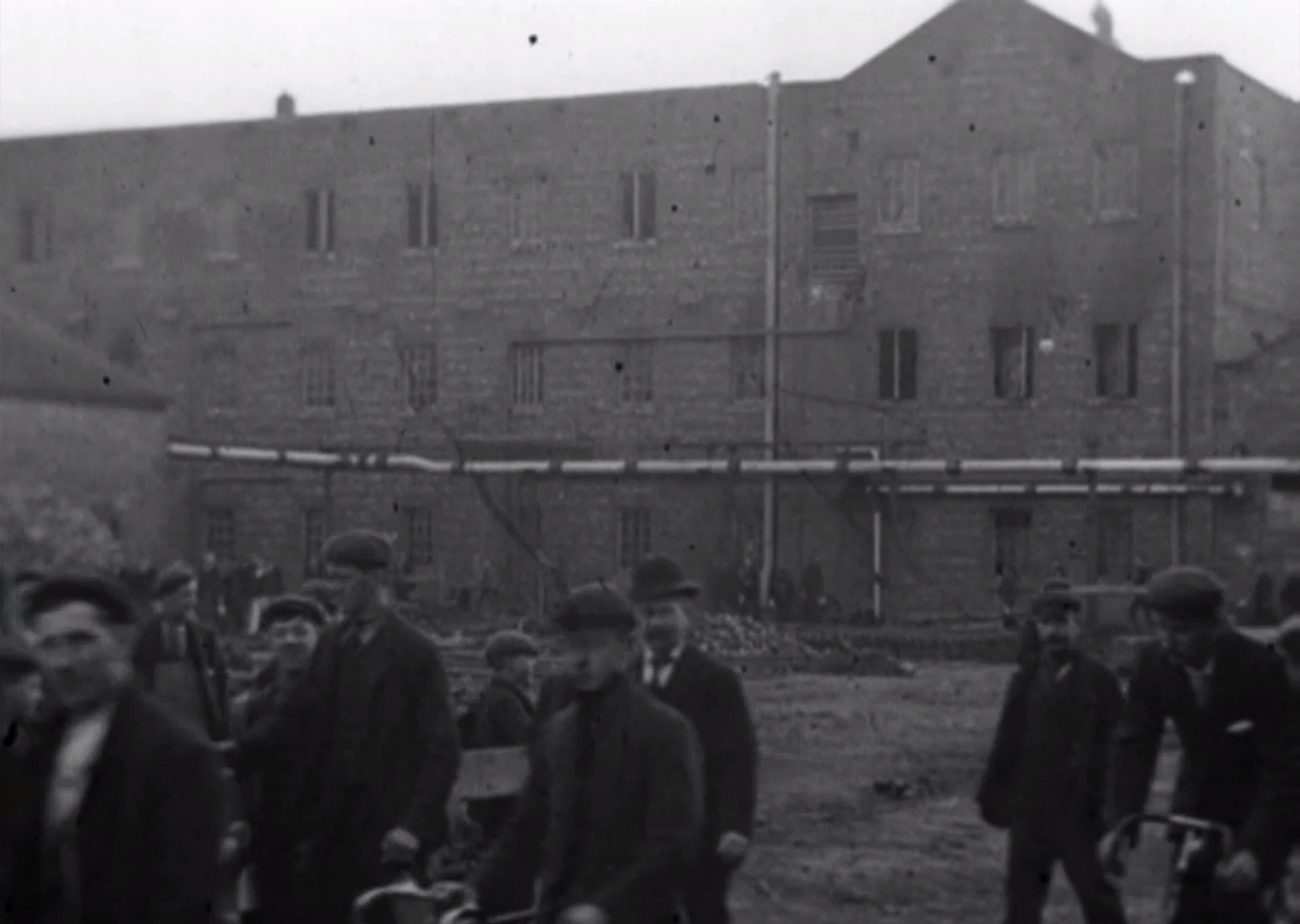
- Screenshot from the film
- Produced by: James Kenyon, Sagar Mitchell
- Release date: 1901
- Running time: 1 minute 39 seconds
- Country: United Kingdom
- Language: Silent

Employees Leaving Messrs Vickers and Maxim's in Barrow is a 1901 black and white silent short film documenting boys and men of all different ages leaving the Williamson's Factory in Lancashire, England. The film was produced by James Kenyon and Sagar Mitchell.

== Synopsis ==
The film shows employees of all ages, including children, leaving the Williamson's factory in Lancashire after a full work day. While most of the employees depart the factory on foot a few jump on the back of trailers being pulled by horses or using personal bicycles. The film is one of some early films that shows that child labour was seen as acceptable among families as many families were considered poor or seen as the lower class.
