= Imitating the dog =

imitating the dog is a British touring theatre company founded in 1998. Its artistic directors are Andrew Quick, Pete Brooks and Simon Wainwright. The company works as an ensemble and key collaborators have included designer Laura Hopkins, composer Jeremy Peyton Jones and Morven Macbeth, Laura Atherton, Anna Wilson and Matt Prendergast as performers. Their productions have included Hotel Methuselah (written and directed by Quick and Brooks) in 2006; Kellerman (written and directed by Quick and Brooks) in 2008; 6 Degrees Below the Horizon (written and directed by Quick and Brooks) in 2011; The Zero Hour (written and directed by Quick and Brooks) in 2012; Ernest Hemingway's A Farewell to Arms (adapted and directed by Quick and Brooks) in 2014; H. G. Wells' War of the Worlds (adapted and directed by Brooks, Quick, and Wainwright) in 2026. The company has also collaborated on other projects including The Hound of the Baskervilles with Oldham Coliseum in 2012; Sea Breeze, staged at The Winter Gardens in Morecambe with Raison and Willow; The Life and Times of Mitchell and Kenyon (concerning Lancashire cinema pioneers Sagar Mitchell and James Kenyon) in 2014 at The Dukes, Lancaster and Oldham Coliseum.
