= Dora Tulloch =

English stage performer, actor and playwright

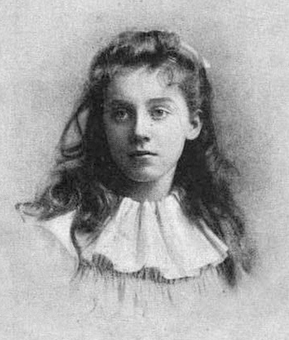
- Dora Tulloch as a young woman, from an 1893 publication.
- Born: Dora Lilian Tulloch; 5 November 1878; Maida Vale, Middlesex
- Died: 30 December 1945 (aged 67); Treborough, Somerset
- Other names: Dora Senior, Dora Clement Salaman
- Occupations: Actress, playwright

Dora Lilian Tulloch (5 November 1878 – 30 December 1945) was an English stage performer, actor and playwright known as Dora Tulloch, Dora Senior and Dora Clement Salaman. She appeared in the 1899 film King John, adapted by Herbert Beerbohm Tree, the first film adaptation of a Shakespeare play.

== Early life ==
Dora Tulloch was born in Maida Vale, Middlesex, London, the daughter of Conrad William A. Tulloch and Kate Wentworth Tulloch. Her sisters Edith, Olive, Ada, and Beryl were also performers.

== Career ==
As a girl "still in the period of loose hair and comparatively short frocks", Tulloch recited poetry in performances with her sisters, especially Edith. An 1892 review referred to her as "most interesting" and "a very clever child". In 1895 she was a speaker on the program for the Proms. Stage appearances by Tulloch included roles in The Little Minister (1898), King John (1899), and The Weavers (1901). She was billed as "Dora Senior" when she played Prince Henry in a short silent film version of King John in 1899, directed by and starring Herbert Beerbohm Tree; this was the first film adaptation of a Shakespeare play.

Dora Senior (Dora Tulloch) as Prince Henry, second from left in this film clip from King John (1899).

After she left the London stage, Dora Salaman continued working in theatre as a playwright, founder and director of the Roadwater Players, and as a judge in theatrical competitions. Published works by Salaman included The Lesson (1928), The Tale of a Cat, and Other Plays (1931), The Haunted Road, or Dead Woman's Ditch (1931), Flood Time (1936), A Pottle o' Brains (1938), Son for the Sea (1938), The Three Sillies (1939), and Always a Prisoner (1939).

== Personal life ==
Dora Tulloch married Clement Isaac Salaman in 1901 and retired from acting. She had five children: Barbara, Bettie, Adam, Sebastian, and Oliver. She was widowed in 1935, lost her son Adam in World War II in 1942, and she died in 1945, in Treborough, Somerset, aged 67 years.

Her grandson Clement Salaman (1932–2018) was a translator and expert on philosopher Marsilio Ficino. Her nieces included actress Merula Salaman (1914–2000), wife of Sir Alec Guinness.
