= S. A. Cookson =

English stage and film actor

Samuel Autey Cookson (6 September 1868, Chorley, Lancashire, England, UK – 27 February 1947, Bridgwater, Somerset, England, UK), known as S.A. Cookson, was an English stage and film actor. He appeared in the 1899 film King John, adapted by Herbert Beerbohm Tree.
