= Mitchell and Kenyon =

Former British film company

The Mitchell & Kenyon film company was a pioneer of early commercial motion pictures based in Blackburn in Lancashire, England, at the start of the 20th century. They were originally best known for minor contributions to early fictional narrative film and Boer War dramatisation films, but the discovery in 1994 of a hoard of film negatives led to restoration of the Mitchell & Kenyon Collection, the largest surviving collection of early non-fiction actuality films in the world. This collection provides a fresh view of Edwardian era Britain and is an important resource for historians.

== Background ==
Following on from the first motion picture, made in October 1888 by Louis Le Prince in the United Kingdom, the first showing to a paying audience was by Auguste and Louis Lumière of France, in Paris in 1895 and in London the following year, featuring La sortie des usines Lumière showing workers leaving their factory gates in Lyon. Others in France and Britain soon made films, some in "the factory-gate film" genre, and when Mitchell & Kenyon came together they found themselves ideally placed in the heart of the industrial North of England. People were excited at the opportunity of seeing themselves on film, and there were commercial opportunities for short films featuring as many local people as possible.

== "We take them and make them." ==
Sagar Mitchell and James Kenyon founded the firm of Mitchell & Kenyon in 1897. Under the trade name of Norden, the company was one of the largest film producers in the United Kingdom in the 1900s. With the slogans of "Local Films For Local People" and "We take them and make them", they operated initially from their respective business premises at 40 Northgate and 21 King Street, Blackburn.

The first reported showing of a Mitchell & Kenyon film was a film of Blackburn Market, shown at 40 Northgate, in Blackburn, on 27 November 1897. The company produced films either on their own initiative or as commissioned by local businesses. In April 1899 the travelling showman George Green commissioned them to film workers leaving factories, to be shown at the Easter fair, thus beginning the showing of their films by a network of showmen.

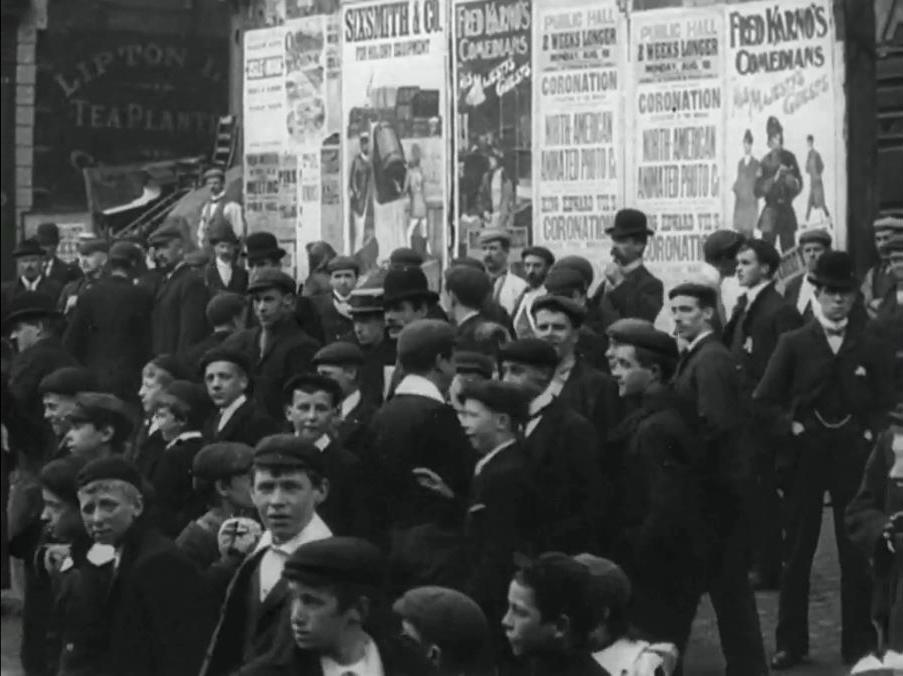
1902 Street scene in Wigan: Includes a broadside poster for Fred Karno's company and an "Animated Photo" show

Three Norden fiction films released in September 1899 – The Tramp's Surprise, The Tramps and the Artist, and Kidnapping by Indians – brought them to national attention. The success of their early films encouraged Mitchell to give up his shop and in September 1901 Mitchell & Kenyon moved into premises in Clayton Street, Blackburn, to concentrate on film production. Fiction production was not as extensive as their production of "topicals", but by 1903 the company had an outdoor studio at its premises at 22 Clayton Street, Blackburn, which was used in addition to outside locations. The Cinema Museum in London currently preserves 65 Norden fiction films.

The showmen became self-publicising travelling cinematograph operators. Films taken during the day were shown on the same evening in fairground tents or local meeting halls and music halls with slogans like "see yourselves as others see you". Dramas took a while to catch on and the non-fiction actuality films were more popular. A typical two-hour programme would show drama, comedy, live actors and then the main attraction, local "topicals", with a brass band and the showman's commentary during the silent films, plus occasional sound effects from guns and members of the audience paid to scream and faint to add to the excitement.

=== Topicals ===
Glasgow trams, filmed by the Mitchell & Kenyon film company in 1901 or 1902

As well as workers streaming out of factory gates, Mitchell & Kenyon filmed street scenes, parades, marches, walking out on Sunday and the fairgrounds. Charmingly, as the crowds pass by there are usually a few who come up and stare or wave at the camera, in a way that nowadays annoys news presenters. The street scenes are busy with pedestrians wandering across in front of the slow horse-drawn carts and trams, some horse-drawn as well as the new electric trams, and Mitchell & Kenyon added variety by filming from moving trams. Bicycles abound, and they also showed the novel rarity, a motor car. Warships and steamboats are shown, and at the Liverpool docks emigrants are shown boarding ships such as the Cunarder RMS Saxonia bound for Boston, the films having been developed on the same day for relatives to see that night.

Workers now had one week's holiday each year, albeit unpaid, and films were made in the thriving holiday resorts including Blackpool and Morecambe Bay. Leisure activities shown include boating on rivers, promenading in pleasure gardens and rolling Easter eggs.

The parades and processions include carnivals with participants blacking up and doing 'golliwog' dance routines, and men dressed as both Dutch men and women doing a clog dance. Others show religious processions, carnival processions, charity parades and marches, and Temperance parades featuring their children's section, The Band of Hope. Military marches and parades were featured, as well as marches by the Boys' Brigade and the Church Lads' Brigade.

=== News and re-enactments ===
The outbreak of the Boer War in South Africa in October 1899 brought new business opportunities to the company – it turned its attention to the production of war films. Troops were shown marching off to join the war or coming back from the front, past flag waving spectators. Crowds were shown greeting war heroes, in particular Private Charles Ward of Leeds, the last man to receive the Victoria Cross from Queen Victoria herself, being interviewed by Ralph Pringle.

Fictionalised scenes from the South African war and the Boxer Rebellion were filmed in the countryside around Blackburn. These are described as fakes, but the audiences may well have accepted them as dramatic re-enactments. Screenings were enlivened by smoke bombs and guns being fired.

Mitchell & Kenyon's most innovative film was The Arrest of Goudie in 1901, which is arguably the world's first filmed crime reconstruction – the film incorporates the actual crime locations and depicts the arrest of Thomas Goudie, a Bank of Liverpool employee who embezzled £170,000 while involved in a gambling ring. The film was shown at the Prince of Wales Theatre in Liverpool only three days after Goudie's arrest. Goudie was subsequently jailed for ten years. A full detailed history of this film by Vanessa Toulmin can be found in "An Early Film Crime Rediscovered: Mitchell & Kenyon’s Arrest of Goudie (1901)", in Film History volume 16, no 1 (2004): 37–53.

=== Sports ===
The recent introduction of Saturday afternoons off work had made sporting events into popular mass entertainment. Mitchell & Kenyon filmed these events, taking care to get as many spectators in as possible as well as showing some of the action. They took the first known film of the newly renamed Manchester United, at the match they played on 6 December 1902 against Burnley – the film was to have been shown that evening at the Burnley Mechanics' Institute, but the showing was cancelled as Burnley lost 2–0, and the film was never shown until its recent rediscovery. A match between Sheffield United and Bury in September 1902 featured William "Fatty" Foulke, one of the most famous players of his day who also played for Bradford City and Chelsea. They also filmed possibly the first football injury to be captured on film, when an Irish striker struck the goalpost in the Wales versus Ireland international match at Wrexham in 1906. For further details see Vanessa Toulmin, "Edwardian Sport on Film", International Journal of Sport in History, volume 26, no. 2 (2006).

The filmed reenactment of Arthur Mold throwing to A. N. Hornby

Rugby league and cricket matches were also featured, and when A.D. Thomas, who styled himself "the picture king, the mastermind of the world", heard of a cricketing scandal where the respected Lancashire bowler Arthur Mold was repeatedly no-balled by the umpire, Jim Phillips, he promptly commissioned a filmed re-enactment of Mold's bowling to prove that his technique was valid – the first action replay, which was a popular success.

Other films featured rowing events, horse trotting, athletics, cycle races and motor tricycle races.

=== Comedy ===
As early as 1900 some fiction films included slapstick comedy with blundering policemen, in anticipation of the Keystone Cops and Charlie Chaplin more than a decade later. Diving Lucy of 1903 showed a lady's legs sticking up out of a pond in Blackburn's Queen's Park, and rescuers setting up a plank which a tubby policeman goes out on only to find it a hoax, at which the others let go and he falls in the water. It was an international success, in France and the U.S. where it was billed as "the hit British comedy of the year".

To enliven some street scenes the showmen arranged for mock fights or hosing down a spectator, and slapstick was added to park scenes with male actors dressed as women falling off a donkey or in the water from a boat, revealing their petticoats under the long skirts of the time.

=== Decline ===
In May 1907 Sagar Mitchell resumed possession of his original business, S. & J. Mitchell, at 40 Northgate, Blackburn. The volume of film production seems to have tailed off from this date, and from 1909 was increasingly restricted to local events. By the mid-1900s the taste of audiences for seeing themselves was fading, and more structured films were coming into vogue and the company concentrated on their fictional output. The last surviving film dates from 1913. Mitchell was joined in his business by his son John in 1921. His partnership with Kenyon was formally dissolved around 1922 and Kenyon died in 1925. Mitchell carefully stored the film negatives away in the basement of his shop. He lived to the age of 85, and died on 2 October 1952. John continued to run the business until he retired in 1960.

== Discovery and restoration of the Collection ==
In 1994, during demolition work in what had been Mercers toy shop in Northgate, Blackburn, two workmen were clearing out the basement when they found three metal drums like milk churns, and looked inside to see hundreds of small spools of film. On their way to the Lethbridges Scrap Metal Processors was Magic Moments Video which did cine to video transfers, and the workmen dragged in a churn and asked the proprietor, Nigel Garth Gregory, if the films were of any value.

Knowing of local businessman and historian Peter Worden's interest in cinematography, Gregory phoned Worden and offered to arrange for the drums to be delivered to him. Following delivery Worden examined the rolls and realised that the film stock was highly volatile and stored the rolls in a chest freezer in his garage until their transfer to the British Film Institute in July 2000. A large cache of Mitchell & Kenyon negative and positive films and a Norden cinematographic camera was offered by Christie's South Kensington on 23 November 1995. A second group of five 35 mm negatives was sold by the same auction house on 20 February 1997. The film titles sold in the initial lot are listed in the reference.

Worden, along with another local historian, Robin Whalley, researched the films and provided an invaluable introduction to the firm and their films in an article published as "Forgotten Firm" in Film History, volume 10, no. 1, 1998 (ISBN 1-86462-031-5).

The Peter Worden Collection of Mitchell & Kenyon Films has been preserved by the staff at the British Film Institute's National Film and Television Archive. To carefully store the flammable 35 mm nitrate negatives, they use rooms constructed with water tanks suspended above a glass ceiling—if the stock were the stock to ignite, the fire would cause the glass ceiling to fail, enabling the water tanks to immediately extinguish the fire. Through painstaking film preservation techniques, they produced clean, scratch-free positives and adjusted the frame speed to smooth out variations in these hand-cranked originals. The resulting footage is amazingly fresh and natural, offering an extraordinary glimpse into the social record of early 20th century British life.

The University of Sheffield's National Fairground Archive and the British Film Institute were awarded a three-year research grant by the Arts and Humanities Research Board to research, catalogue, identify and contextualise the 800-plus films. This has culminated in a collection of essays, The Lost World of Mitchell and Kenyon: Edwardian Britain on Film, edited by Vanessa Toulmin, Simon Popple and Patrick Russell and published by the BFI in October 2004 (ISBN 1-84457-046-0, paperback, ISBN 1-84457-047-9, hardback) and 15 articles. The major catalogue and interpretation of the Collection has been published by the British Film Institute titled Electric Edwardians: The Story of the Mitchell & Kenyon Collection (London: BFI, 2006), by Vanessa Toulmin; it contains 431 stills from the collection, an array of handbills and posters from the National Fairground Archive and 100,000 words of text and filmographic references. Also available is a companion DVD titled The Electric Edwardians with two hours of highlights from the Collection, extras on the archiving of the films, an essay by film historian Tom Gunning and an interview with the lead researcher on the Collection, Vanessa Toulmin. Other DVD releases include Mitchell & Kenyon in Ireland and Edwardian Sport on Film, though only available in Region 2.

A prime-time three-part series The Lost World of Mitchell & Kenyon was shown on the BBC in January 2005 with enthusiastic commentary by historian Dan Cruickshank and interviews with descendants of people shown in the films, and is available on DVD from the BBC and the BFI.

In 2014, The Life and Times of Mitchell and Kenyon was produced at The Dukes, Lancaster and the Oldham Coliseum, starring Gareth Cassidy, Liam Gerrard and Christopher Wright, with video elements by imitating the dog.

The BFI and the NFA have toured the Collection extensively presenting over 100 shows throughout the North of England, Ireland, Scotland and Wales, proving once again that local films for local people are as popular today as they were a century ago. Vanessa Toulmin of the National Fairground Archive has also presented specialist feature shows on the history of rugby league with Professor Tony Collins, seaside entertainment with John Walton, and football history with Dave Russell.

In May 2011, the Collection was inscribed in UNESCO's UK Memory of the World Register.

== See also ==
- Employees Leaving Messrs Vickers and Maxim's in Barrow
