= The Biter Bit =

1900 British film by James Bamforth

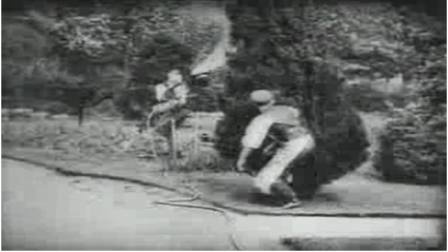
- Screenshot from the film
- Produced by: James Bamforth
- Production company: Bamforth Company
- Release date: December 1899
- Running time: 1 min 9 secs
- Country: United Kingdom
- Language: Silent

Full film

The Biter Bit is an 1899 British short black-and-white silent comedy film, produced by Bamforth & Co Ltd, featuring a boy playing a practical joke on a gardener by grasping his hose to stop the water flow and then letting go when the gardener looks down it to check. The film "is an English remake" of Auguste and Louis Lumière's L'Arroseur Arrosé (1895), according to Michael Brooke of BFI Screenonline, "providing a good illustration of how early film production companies cheerfully plagiarised each other's work" with "a few minor differences between, most notably a rather greater sense of space and depth in the Bamforth version" and "three distinct planes to the action". It is included in the BFI DVD Early Cinema: Primitives and Pioneers and a clip is used in Paul Merton's interactive guide to early British silent comedy How They Laughed on the BFI website.
