= Walter Pfeffer Dando =

British stage engineer and film director

- Born: 1852; London
- Died: 1944

Walter Pfeffer Dando (1852–1944, some sources 1854) was a British stage engineer and early film director. Among his developments and patents were those for a device allowing theatre actors to "fly" about the stage (by 1875) and improvements to the technology for tableaux vivants. Dando also served as an official photographer to the Zoological Society of London.

Dando was the stage manager of the Palace Theatre (1891–1896) before leaving to establish his own business screening "phantom rides", first-person travel footage from trains.

== Personal life ==
Dando attended Southgate College and (date unknown) began work in the counting-house of William Whiteley, Westbourne Grove. He became a member of Whiteley's amateur dramatic club – the Kildare. In 1875 Patented apparatus for flying effects (Patent no. 3067 1875) On 12 April 1877, St Saviour's Church, Hoxton, married Letitia Barry, stage name, Mlle Aenea, "the original flying dancer". Daughter of actors William and Letitia Barry, sister of Katie Barry and Mlle Ariel, niece of George Conquest. 1877 Advertised as maker and supplier of "India-rubber springs for gymnastic or theatrical purposes" (also advertised as "India-rubber spring and chest-expander manufacturer") In 1879, their only child, Letitia Mary Ann Emma 'Queenie' Dando, was born. Following the death of his daughter in 1921 and his wife in 1928, Dando married the much younger dancer, Letitia Daisy Paver, in 1929.

== Works ==
=== Films ===
- King John (1899)

=== Books ===
- Illustrated Official Guide to the London Zoological Society (1906)
- Wild Animals & the Camera (1911)
- More Wild Animals & the Camera (1913)
