= King John (film) =

1899 film by Herbert Beerbohm Tree

King John's Death Scene: Act 3, Scene 3 of King John (1899), corresponding to Act 5, Scene 7 in the original play. Prince Henry attends a poisoned and feverish King John as Lords Pembroke and Salisbury look on.

King John is the title by which the earliest known example of a film based on a play by William Shakespeare is commonly known.

Filmed in London, England, in September 1899, at the British Mutoscope and Biograph Company's open-air studio on the Embankment, it was a silent film made from four very short separate films. Each of those films showed a heavily edited scene from Herbert Beerbohm Tree's forthcoming stage production of Shakespeare's mid-1590s play, King John, at Her Majesty's Theatre London.

The first film was of The Temptation Scene with John, Hubert, and Arthur, the second of The Lamentation Scene with Constance, Philip of France, Lewis, and Pandulph, the third of King John's Dying Scene with John, Henry, Pembroke, and Salisbury, and the fourth of King John's Death Scene with John, Henry, Falconbridge, Pembroke, and Salisbury.

The filming of King John was produced and directed by William Kennedy Laurie Dickson and Walter Pfeffer Dando. The acting and production design was by Herbert Tree, the cinematography was by William Dickson, and the production company was the British Mutoscope and Biograph Company.

== Surviving copies ==
The EYE Film Institute Nederland has an incomplete copy of the third film lasting just under one minute. The last seconds of the scene are missing from the EYE copy; the BFI National Archive has a film clip of a few frames of the missing part.

== Preserved still frames ==
The below still frames from the film were published in the 27 September 1899 issue of The Sketch accompanying a review of Tree's stage production. While these were known to scholars ever since Robert Hamilton Ball's Shakespeare On Silent Film (1968), and preceding journal papers, they were assumed to be ordinary production stills from the stage adaptation. It was not until B. A. Kachur's paper "The First Shakespeare Film: A Reconsideration and Reconstruction of Tree's King John" (1991) in Theatre Survey that they were identified as still frames from the film.

Preserved still frames from King John (1899)

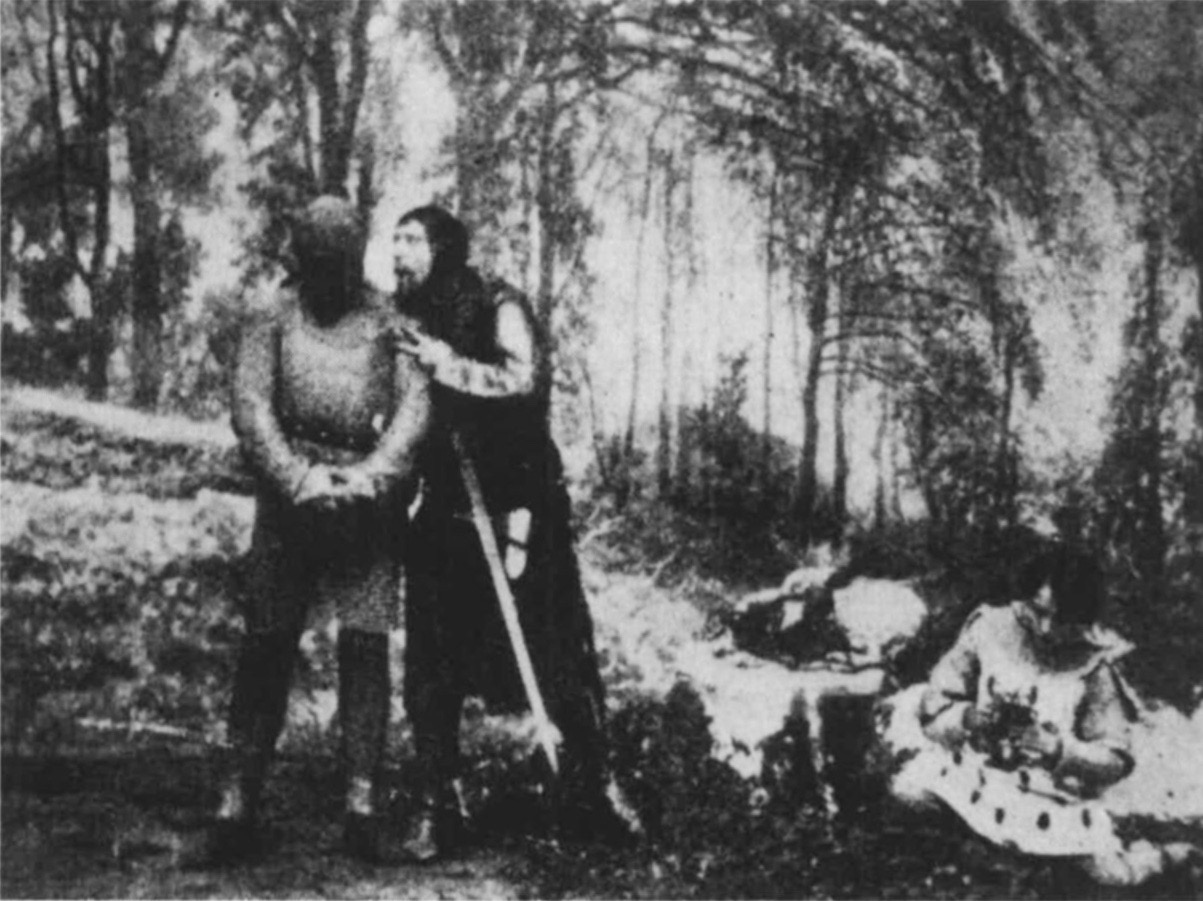
The John—Hubert Temptation Scene: Act 1, Scene 5, corresponding to Act 3, Scene 3 in the original play. King John (center) persuades Hubert (left) to murder Prince Arthur (kneeling on the right).

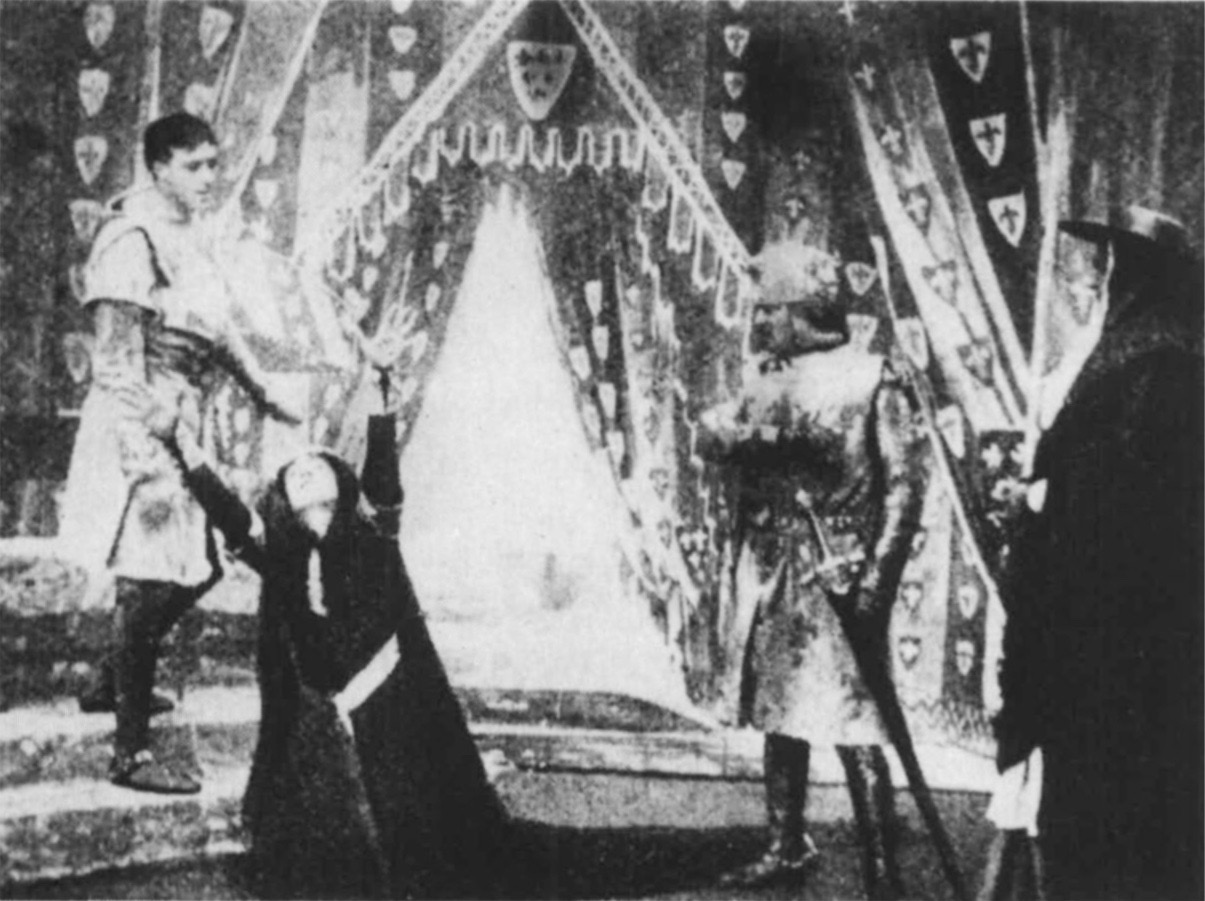
The Lamentation Scene: Act 2, Scene 1, corresponding to Act 3, Scene 4 in the original play. Lady Constance (front left) laments the capture of her son, Prince Arthur, as Lewis (rear left), Cardinal Pandulph (front right), and Philip of France (rear right) look on.

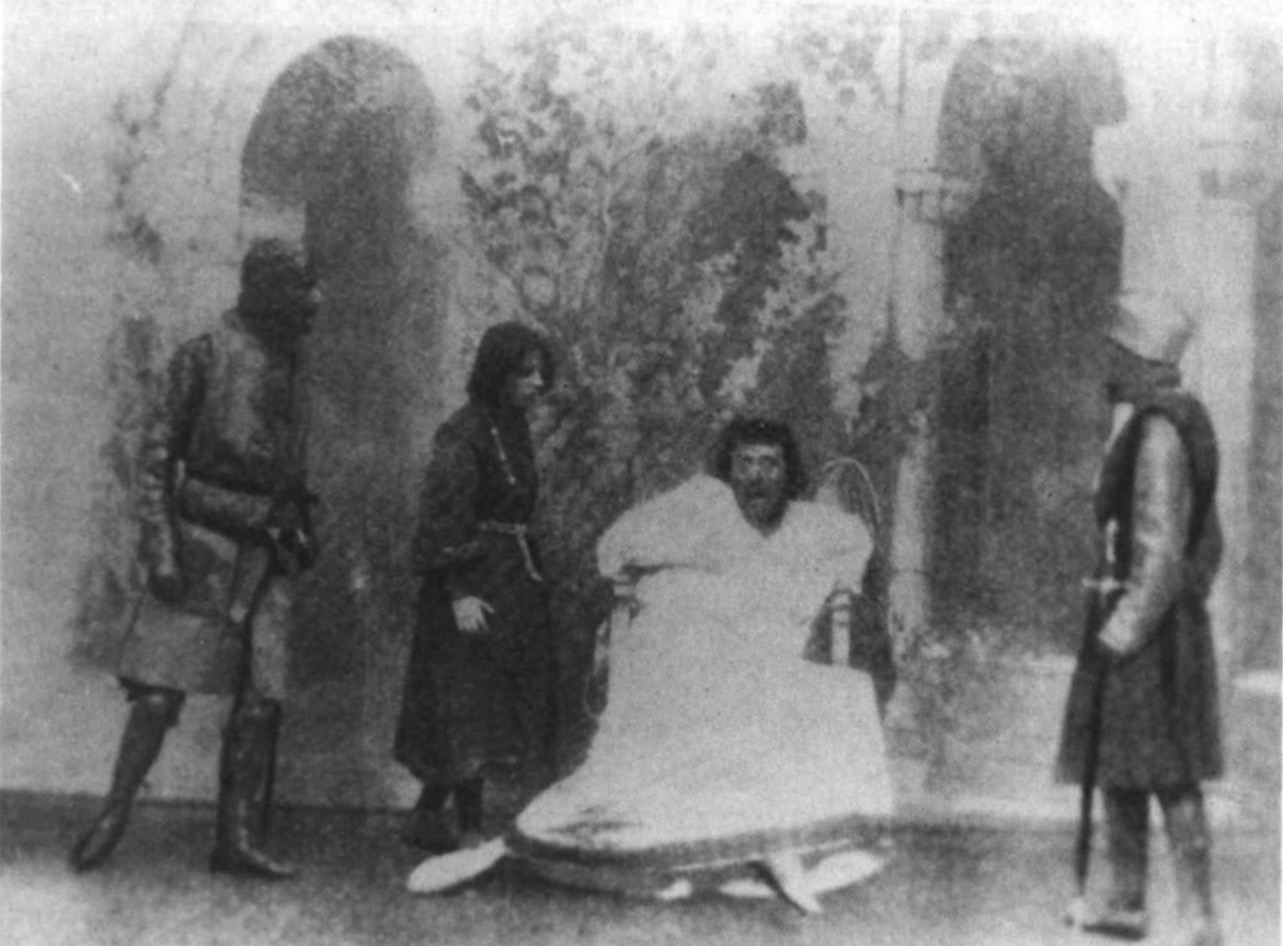
King John's Death Scene: Act 3, Scene 3, corresponding to Act 5, Scene 7 in the original play. A poisoned and feverish King John (in the throne, center stage) rants as Prince Henry (center stage to John's right), Pembroke, and Salisbury looks on.

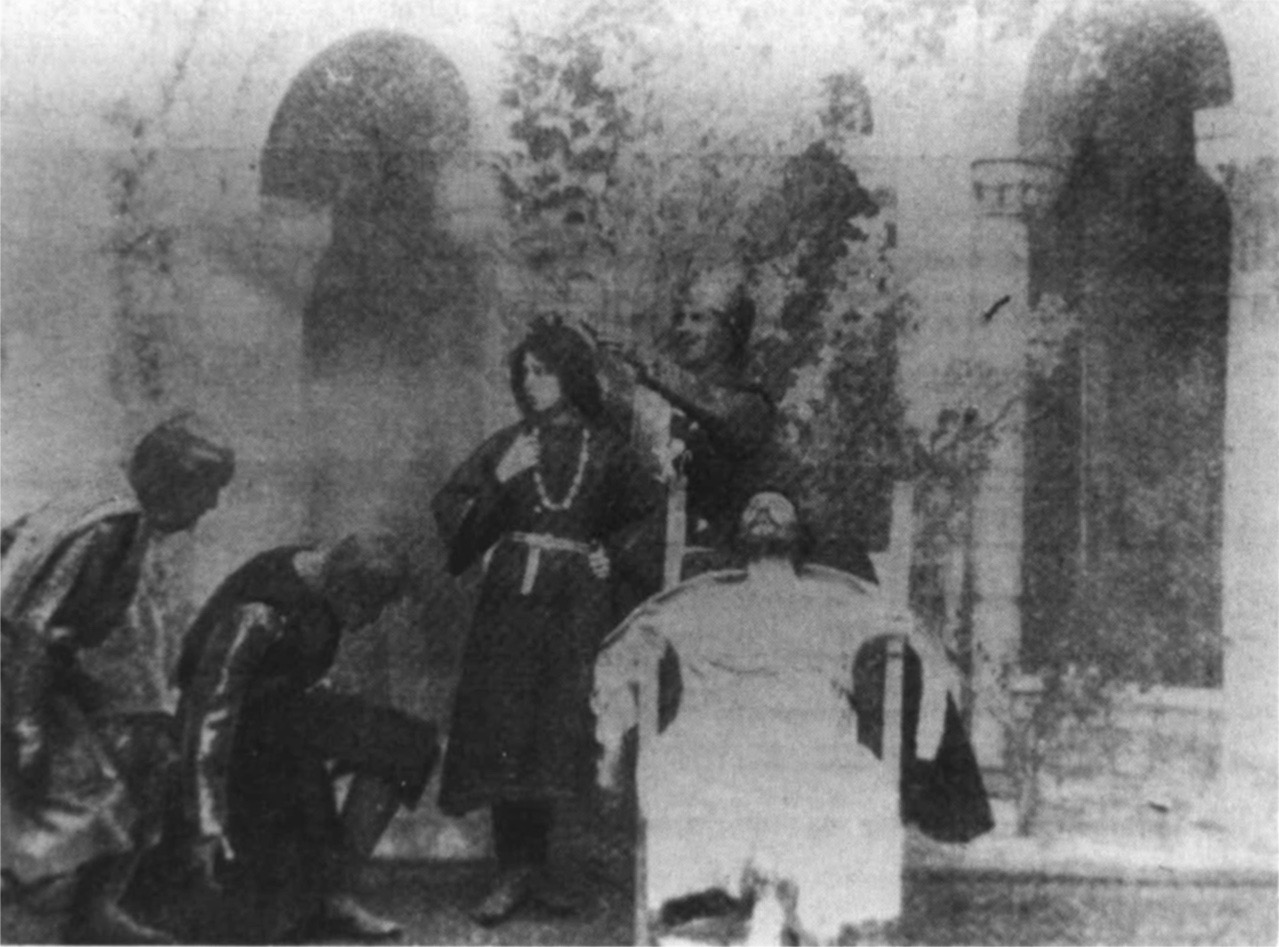
King John's Death Scene: Act 3, Scene 3, corresponding to Act 5, Scene 7 in the original play. King John (in the throne, center stage) lays dead as Faulconbridge (rear center) crowns Prince Henry (front left of Faulconbridge) while the kneeling Pembroke, and Salisbury looks on.

== Cast ==
- Herbert Beerbohm Tree as King John
- Dora Senior as Prince Henry
- Charles Sefton as Prince Arthur
- James Fisher as Earl of Pembroke
- S. A. Cookson as Earl of Salisbury
- Franklyn McLeay as Hubert de Burgh
- Lewis Waller as Philip Faulconbridge
- Julia Neilson as Constance
- William Mollison as Philip, King of France
- Gerald Lawrence as Lewis, The Dauphin
- Louis Calvert as Cardinal Pandulph

== Sources ==
- Ball, Robert Hamilton (1968). Shakespeare On Silent Film. London: George Allen & Unwin.
- Buchanan, Judith (2009). Shakespeare on Silent Film: An Excellent Dumb Discourse. Cambridge: Cambridge University Press. ISBN 978-0521871990.
- Kachur, B. A. (1991). "The First Shakespeare Film: A Reconsideration and Reconstruction of Tree's King John". Theatre Survey. 32 (1). American Society for Theatre Research: 43–63. doi:10.1017/S0040557400009455. eISSN 1475-4533. ISSN 0040-5574. S2CID 163724624 – via Cambridge Core.
- Newton, H. C. (27 September 1899). "Review of King John". The Sketch.
