= How Would You Like to Be the Ice Man? =

1899 short film

- Release date: April 29, 1899
- Country: United States
- Language: English

How Would You Like to Be the Ice Man?, also known as How'd you like to be the iceman?, is an 1899 or 1900 -some sources even indicating 1902 as release year- American comedy film either by the Lubin Manufacturing Company or American Mutoscope company, inspired by the popular song with the same name. (Note: The song was written by J. Fredric Helf and Edward P. Moran.The song was used as a repertoire in a performance by vaudevillian William F. Denny)

== Plot ==
A book agent calls on a woman, who is engaged in washing clothes. He proceeds to try to convince her that she should buy his book, which she flatly refuses. He then tries to make love to her and embraces her, when the iceman, who is her friend, suddenly enters and proceeds to hammer the dude book agent. After throwing him out, he returns, and is rewarded by his lady love with numerous kisses. (Note: This is the plot described in the advertisement for the film in the Lubin film studios catalogue in 1907, and the film was classified in "comic scenes".)
