= Bamforth & Co Ltd =

Film and illustration company

Coordinates: 53.57109663303244°N 1.7845329455739753°W

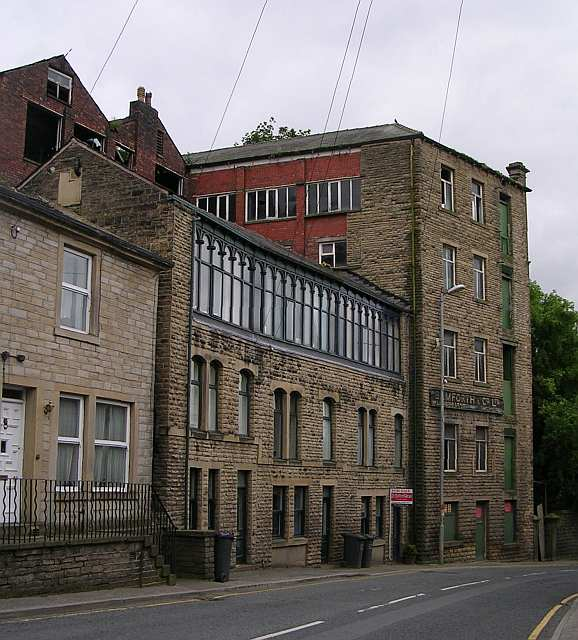
Bamforth & Co Ltd premises, Station Road, Holmfirth, 2007

Bamforth & Co Ltd was a publishing, film and illustration company based in Holmfirth, West Yorkshire, England.

== History ==
Bamforth & Co Ltd was started in 1870 by James Bamforth, a portrait photographer in Holmfirth, West Yorkshire. In 1883 he began to specialise in making lantern slides. In 1898 the company started making silent monochrome films with the Riley Brothers of Bradford, West Yorkshire, who had been making films since 1896. James Bamforth's expertise with lantern slides proved invaluable in the film making. They used a camera developed by Bradford cine inventor Cecil Wray. This partnership with Riley and Bamforth, known as "RAB Films" lasted until 1900. Though film production was restarted in 1913 it was again stopped in 1915, when the film production was changed to the newly named Holmfirth Producing Company, which quickly moved operations to London. The last Holmfirth film, Meg o' the Woods, emerged in February 1918.

In 1910 Bamforth & Co Ltd started making illustrated 'saucy' seaside postcards which, like its films, were exported worldwide for sale. The company was bought out by the Dennis Printing Company, of Scarborough during the early 1980s. Following the demise of Dennis the Bamforth & Co name, with postcards rights to over 50,000 designs, were purchased by Ian Wallace in 2001.

Although the Bamforth company was best known in the United Kingdom for producing a wide range of topographical and tourist postcards as well as 'saucy' seaside postcards, what is less well known was their rich history of filmmaking. Drawing heavily on their work with magic lantern cinema, the company began making monochrome films in 1898. The popularity of these films, in particular those featuring a character named Winky, led to a film industry in West Yorkshire which for a time surpassed that of Hollywood in terms of productivity and originality.

In September 2010, on the 100th anniversary of the original launch of the postcards, the new owner Ian Wallace relaunched the publication and sale of the postcards, with the Jane Evans Licensing Consultancy. Currently Mercury Print & Packaging, in Leeds has the exclusive right to reprint and distribute

== Film titles ==
=== 1898 – 1900 ===
- Weary Willie (1898)
- The Tramp and the Baby's Bottle (1899)
- The Kiss in the Tunnel (1899)
- Catching the Milk Thief (1899)
- Women's Rights (1899)
- The Would-Be Conjuror (1900)
- Lover Kisses Husband (1900)
- Leap Frog (1900)
- Boys Cricket Match and Fight (1900)
- Boys Sliding (1900)
- Boys Playing in Snow (1900)
- Rough Sea (1900)
- Biter Bit (A Joke on the Gardener) (1900).
- Rugby Football Match (1901)

=== 1913–1915 ===
- Finding His Counterpart (1913)
- Winky As A Suffragette (1914)
- Winky – Bigamist (1914)
- Winky Diddles The Hawker (1914)
- Winky Gets "Puffed Up" (1914)
- Winky Goes Camping (1914)
- Winky Goes to the Front (1914)
- Winky's Carving Knife (1914)
- Winky's Fireworks (1914)
- Winky's Invisible Ink (1914)
- Winky's Lifeboat (1914)
- Winky's Next Door Neighbour (1914)
- Winky Takes To Farming (1914)
- Winky, The Park Policeman (1914)
- Winky Waggles The Wicked Widow (1914)
- Winky's "Week-End" (1914)
- Winky And The "Dwarf (?)" (1914)
- The Mighty Atom (1914)
- Winky Learns A Lesson in Honesty (1914)
- Winky's Ruse (1914)
- Jessie (1914)
- The Mystic Glove (1914)
- Itching Powder (1914)
- Birds of a Feather Plot Together (1914)
- How Winky Fought for a Bride (1914)
- Kill That Fly! (1914)
- The Muddletown Fire Brigade (1914)
- Peppering His Own Porridge (1914)
- Papa's Little Weakness (1914)
- Who's Which? (1914)
- Winky and the Cannibal Chief (1914)
- Winky and the Gorgonzola Cheese (1914)
- Winky and the Leopard (1914)
- Winky Becomes A Family Man (1914)
- Winky Causes A Small-Pox Panic (1914)
- Winky Dons The Petticoats (1914)
- Winky Gets Spotted (1914)
- Winky Goes Spy Catching (1914)
- Winky Is Accused of An 'Orrible Crime (1914)
- Winky's Cat (1914)
- Winky's Guilty Conscience (1914)
- Winky's Jealousy (1914)
- Winky's Mother-In-Law (1914)
- Winky's Strategem (1914)
- Winky Tries Chicken Raising (1914)
- Winky Wins (1914)
- War Cartoons (1914)
- Sharps And Flats (1915)
- Always Tell Your Husband (1915)
- And That's How The Row Began (1915)
- Artful, Not 'Alf (1915)
- A Bachelor's Babies (1915)
- Bertie's Holiday (1915)
- A Bid for a Bounty (1915)
- Bumble's Blunder (1915)
- Cod-Fish And Aloes (1915)
- A Comedy of Errors (1915)
- The Counterfeit Cowboy (1915)
- Culture And Kultur in Belgium (1915)
- Dr Violet Dearing (1915)
- Don't Jump To Conclusions (1915)
- Ever Been Had? (1915)
- Foul Play (1915)
- Getting on His Nerves (1915)
- A Good Little Pal (1915)
- The Green-Eyed Monster (1915)
- Have Some More Meat? (1915)
- Hilda Routs The Enemy (1915)
- Hilda's Busy Day (1915)
- Igh Art (1915)
- Is America Ready (1915)
- Lily's Birthday (1915)
- Lily, Tomboy (1915)
- Love and a Legacy (1915)
- Love And Cameras (1915)
- Mamma's D.E.A.R. (1915)
- The Man in Possession (1915)
- Monty's Monocle (1915)
- Moonstruck (1915)
- A Mushroom Stew (1915)
- Never Despair (1915)
- No Fool Like An Old Fool (1915)
- Oh! My! (1915)
- Once Upon A Time (1915)
- One on Irey (1915)
- A Pair of Dummies (1915)
- Pair of Stars (1915)
- Peace at Any Price (1915)
- Pin Pricks (1915)
- Putting on the Fluence (1915)
- Papa Scores (1915)
- Scottie and the Frogs (1915)
- Scottie Loves Ice Cream (1915)
- Scottie's Day Out (1915)
- Scottie Turns The Handle (1915)
- The Tell-Tale Crystal Globe (1915)
- That's Done It ! (1915)
- Tommy's Freezing Spray (1915)
- Troubles of a Hypochrondiac (1915)
- Venus and the Knuts (1915)
- What A Find (1915)
- What A Picnic (1915)
- What Scottie Heard (1915)
- What's in a Name (1915)
- What The – ? (1915)
- The White Hand (1915)
- White Star (1915)
- Who Were You With Last Night (1915)
- Winky: Photographer (1915)
- Winky's Blue Diamond (1915)
- Winky, The Long And Short Of It (1915)
- Won By A Fluke (1915)
- There's Hair ! (1915)
- Paula (1915)

== See also ==
=== Original Black & White film clips ===
- The Kiss In The Tunnel (1899) – Original film clip at Yorkshire and North East Film Archive
- Women's Rights (1899) – Original film clip at Yorkshire and North East Film Archive
- Winky Causes a Smallpox Panic (1914) – Original film clip at Yorkshire and North East Film Archive
