= Kidnapping by Indians =

1899 film

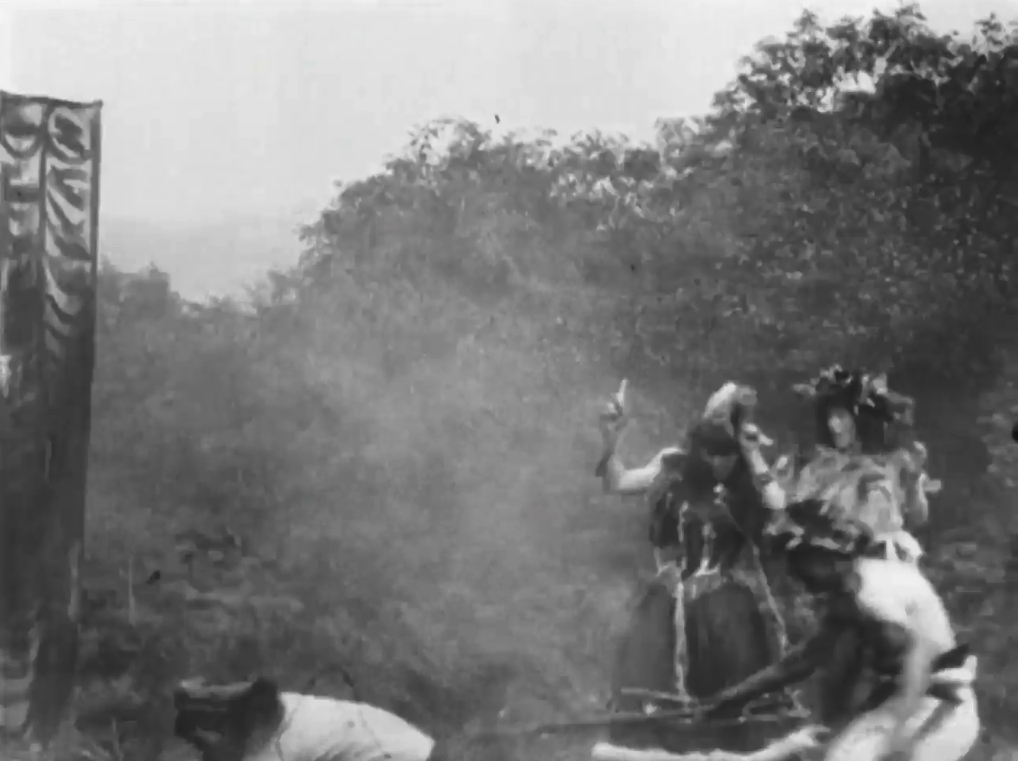
- Film screenshot
- Directed by: Mitchell and Kenyon
- Produced by: Mitchell and Kenyon
- Cinematography: James Kenyon
- Release date: 1899
- Running time: 1 minute
- Country: United Kingdom
- Languages: Silent; English intertitles

Kidnapping by Indians is an 1899 British short silent Western film, made by the Mitchell and Kenyon film company, shot in Blackburn, England. It is believed to be the first dramatic film in the Western genre, pre-dating Edwin S. Porter's The Great Train Robbery by four years.

== Background ==
According to Jamie Holman, local researcher James Kenyon of Mitchell & Kenyon met some Americans in Blackburn when he was a boy. This sparked his interest in the "Wild West" and ultimately led to the production of this film. The British Film Institute (BFI) questions the ethnicity of the costumes used but Holman has maintained that they are authentic as tomahawks, head-dress and other Western stereotypes are in evidence. Holman says many cotton workers from Blackburn went to America after the American Civil War and brought back stories of the wild frontier which whetted local interest. He says: "Mitchell and Kenyon would have been aware of the appetite for the Wild West at the time". The film was shot in the countryside near Blackburn and used local actors.

According to Bryony Dixon, a curator at the BFI, Kidnapping By Indians is a significant film in the Western genre. The storyline of a white girl being kidnapped by Indians is in The Last of the Mohicans and many Wild West productions such as The Searchers. Ms Dixon admits the film lacks some of the usual Western elements, but then again, so does The Great Train Robbery.

== Plot ==
The plot focuses on an attack by Native Americans on a camp where white people are staying. The attackers set fire to the camp and kidnap a young girl. Some cowboys arrive and a gunfight begins. The captured girl is rescued by the cowboys. The BFI suggests the film may be a scene from a larger stage production.

== See also ==
- List of Western films before 1920
- Buffalo Dance, 1894 film
