= A Mysterious Portrait =

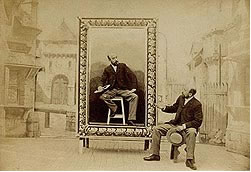
- A scene from the film
- Directed by: Georges Méliès
- Release date: 1899
- Running time: Short
- Country: France
- Language: Silent film

A Mysterious Portrait (French: Le Portrait mystérieux), also known as The Mysterious Portrait, is an 1899 French silent trick film directed by Georges Méliès. It was released by Méliès's Star Film Company and is numbered 196 in its catalogs, where it is advertised as a grande nouveauté photographique extraordinaire.

== Summary ==
A Mysterious Portrait (1899)

A magician displays an empty picture frame against a stage backdrop, including posters on the wall. Unrolling this backdrop to reveal another, he places a neutral canvas and a stool inside the picture frame. With a gesture, the magician makes his own image come slowly into focus in the frame. It comes immediately to life, and the magician and his image hold a conversation before the image fades out of focus and disappears again.

== Production ==
Méliès himself plays the magician in the film. The posters on the wall advertise his own Paris theatre of illusions, the Théâtre Robert-Houdin.

Effects in the film were created using the substitution splice, two multiple exposures, dissolves, and defocusing the lens to create a soft focus effect. The portrait effect is an early example of a matte effect in filmmaking, in which a mask over the lens ensured that only a specific section of the image in view would be filmed and exposed. Matting had been used in still photography since the 1850s, when photographers such as Henry Peach Robinson and Oscar Gustave Rejlander used them to compose painting-like scenes. The first filmmaker to take advantage of it was likely the British cinematic pioneer George Albert Smith (who knew of Méliès through their mutual colleague Charles Urban). Méliès continued to experiment with matting techniques in later films, such as The One Man Band and A Spiritualist Photographer.

== Themes ==
The film repeats the theme of doubling or duplication, previously explored by Méliès in The Four Troublesome Heads but now expanded from the head to the whole body. As the film historian John Frazer pointed out, the film is inherently self-referential, but was "made seventy years before that concept came into the critical language."
