= Sagar Mitchell =

British photographer and film producer (1866–1952)

Sagar Jones Mitchell (28 October 1866 – 2 October 1952) was a pioneer of cinematography in Blackburn, Lancashire, England.

The son of John and Eliza Mitchell, he was educated at a private academy and apprenticed as a cabinet maker. In 1887 Sagar and his father John founded the firm of S. & J. Mitchell, a photographic apparatus manufacturing and dealing business.

Although associated in partnership with James Kenyon since 1897 little is known of their film production until 1899. The success of their early films encouraged Mitchell to give up his shop and in September 1901 Mitchell and Kenyon moved into premises in Clayton Street, Blackburn, to concentrate on film production. Mitchell and Kenyon used the trade name of Norden, the company became one of the largest film producers in the United Kingdom in the 1900s, producing a mixture of "topicals" (films of street scenes, sporting events, rides through towns on the top of trams, and ordinary life, which were extremely popular as people loved to see moving pictures of themselves), fiction, and fake war films. Many of these films were produced for travelling showmen.

In May 1907 Sagar Mitchell resumed possession of his original business S. & J. Mitchell, at 40 Northgate, Blackburn. The volume of film production seems to have tailed off from this date, and from 1909 was increasingly restricted to local events. The last surviving film dates from 1913. Mitchell was joined in his business by his son John in 1921. His partnership with Kenyon was formally dissolved around 1922 and Kenyon died in 1925. Mitchell carefully stored the film negatives away in the basement of his shop. He lived to the age of 85, and died on 2 October 1952. John continued to run the business until he retired in 1960.

Over the years film historians had traditionally regarded Mitchell and Kenyon as minor contributors to film history, known principally for the fake Boer War films that had survived. Then in 1994, during building alteration work at the premises in Northgate, three large sealed steel drums were discovered in the basement. On examination, the drums were discovered to contain the original nitrate negatives of 800 Mitchell and Kenyon films in a remarkably good state of preservation. These eventually found their way in 2000 to the National Film and Television Archive, where they extended the holdings of films of the 1900-1913 period by 20%, giving a new and fresh view of Edwardian England and an important resource for historians. A further 65 fiction films are preserved in The Cinema Museum, London. The survival of these films has allowed Mitchell and Kenyon's place in English film history to be reappraised.

In 2014 The Life and Times of Mitchell and Kenyon was produced at The Dukes, Lancaster and the Oldham Coliseum, with video elements by theatre company imitating the dog.

For more information on their film work and on the rediscovery of the Mitchell and Kenyon Collection see Mitchell and Kenyon.
