= James Kenyon (cinematographer) =

English pioneer cinematographer (1850–1925)

James Kenyon (26 May 1850 – 6 February 1925) was a businessman and pioneer of cinematography in Blackburn, Lancashire, England.

The son of Thomas and Margaret Kenyon, little is known of his upbringing. He married Elizabeth Fell, and by 1878 he was listed in a local trade directory as a fancy goods dealer. In 1880 he succeeded to the furniture dealing and cabinet making business of his wife's uncle in King Street, Blackburn. This business also occupied premises at the rear at 22 Clayton Street. According to his obituary Kenyon retired from his house furnishing business in 1906. Kenyon had also built a business with the travelling showmen supplying "penny in the slot machines". Kenyon was politically active, in local Liberal circles and later with the early Labour Party.

Although associated in partnership with Sagar Mitchell since 1897 little is known of their film production until 1899. The success of their early films encouraged Mitchell to give up his shop and in September 1901 Mitchell and Kenyon moved into the premises in Clayton Street, Blackburn, to concentrate on film production. Mitchell and Kenyon used the trade name of Norden, and the company became one of the largest film producers in the United Kingdom in the 1900s, producing a mixture of "topicals" (films of street scenes, sporting events, rides through towns on the top of trams, and ordinary life, which were extremely popular as people loved to see moving pictures of themselves), fiction, and fake war films. Many of these films were produced for travelling showmen.

In May 1907 Mitchell resumed possession of his original business S. & J. Mitchell, at 40 Northgate, Blackburn. The volume of film production seems to have tailed off from this date, and from 1909 was increasingly restricted to local events. The last surviving film dates from 1913. His partnership with Mitchell was formally dissolved around 1922 and Kenyon, having retired to Southport, died in 1925. Mitchell carefully stored the film negatives away in the basement of his Northgate shop. He died on 2 October 1952 and his son John continued to run the business until 1960.

Over the years film historians had traditionally regarded Mitchell and Kenyon as minor contributors to film history, known principally for the fake Boer War films that had survived. Then in 1994, during building alteration work at the premises in Northgate, three large sealed steel drums were discovered in the basement. On examination, the drums were discovered to contain the original nitrate negatives of 800 Mitchell and Kenyon films in a remarkably good state of preservation. These eventually found their way in 2000 to the National Film and Television Archive, where they extended the holdings of films of the 1900-1913 period by 20%, giving a new and fresh view of Edwardian England and an important resource for historians. A further 65 fiction films are preserved in The Cinema Museum, London. The survival of these films has allowed Mitchell and Kenyon's place in English film history to be reappraised.

In 2014, The Life and Times of Mitchell and Kenyon was produced at The Dukes, Lancaster and the Oldham Coliseum, with video elements by imitating the dog.

Kenyon was the grandfather of the eminent diplomat Sir Frank Kenyon Roberts, who had fond memories of him.

== See also ==
- Mitchell and Kenyon: more information on their film work and on the rediscovery of the Mitchell and Kenyon Collection
