= The Dukes, Lancaster =

Theatre in Lancaster, England

The Dukes
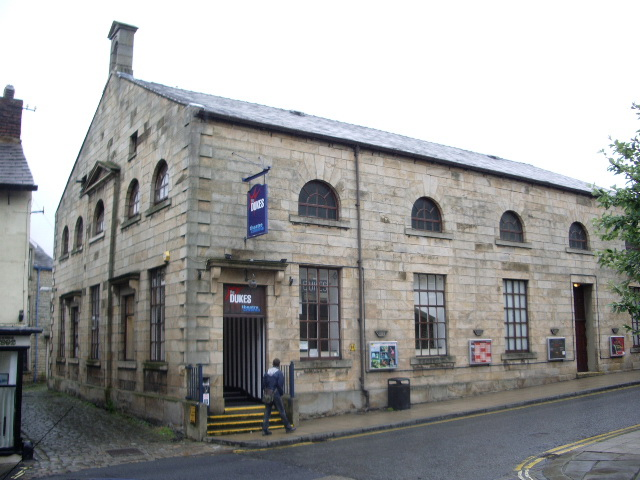
- The Dukes in 2007

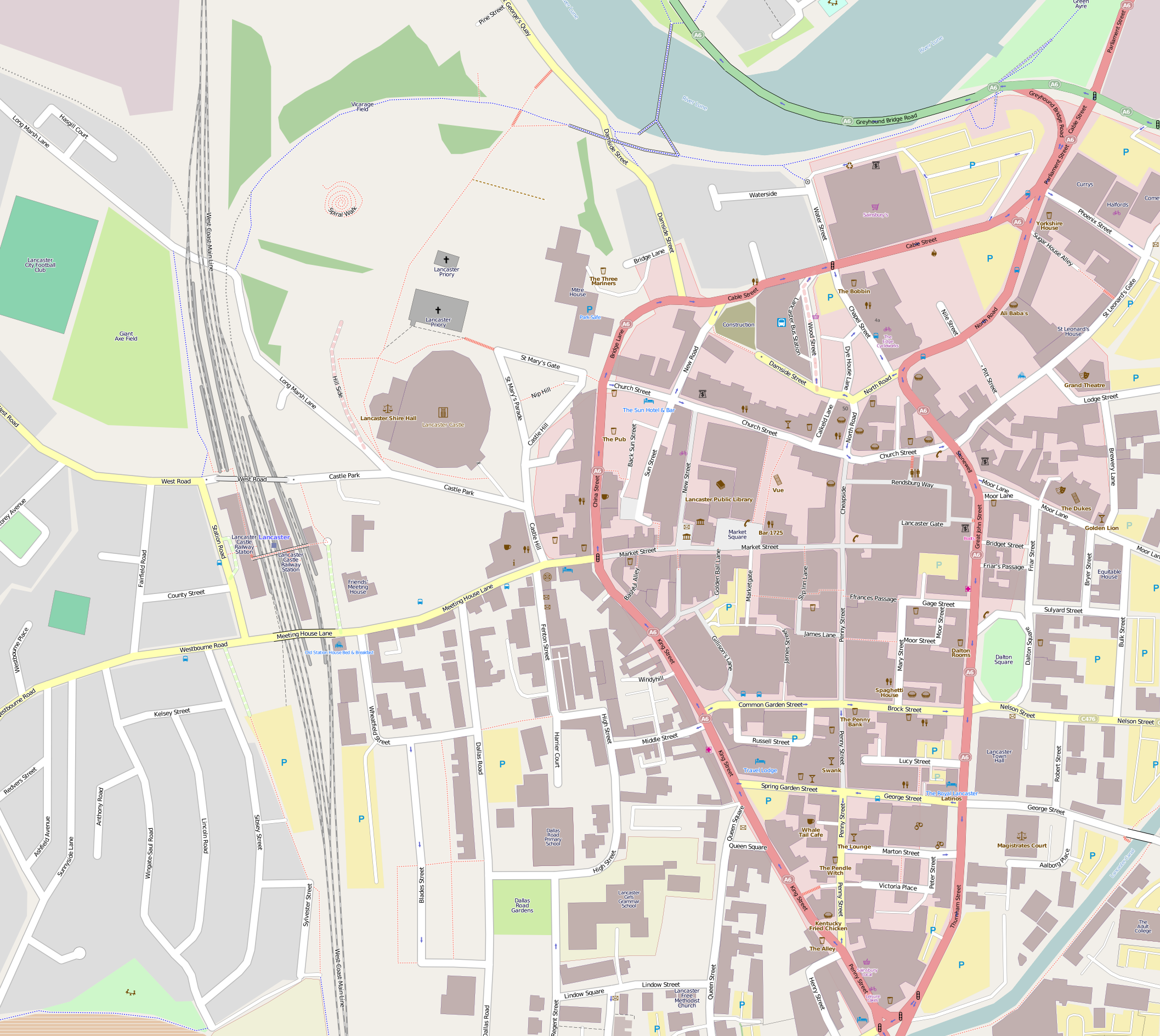
- Location in Lancaster city centre
- Former names: The Dukes Playhouse
- Location: Lancaster, Lancashire, England
- Coordinates: 54.0491°N 2.7964°W
- Capacity: 313 (The Rake); 240 (The Round); 112 (Centre for Creative Learning)
- Type: Theatre

Construction
- Opened: 18 November 1971 (as a theatre)

Website
- www.dukes-lancaster.org

Listed Building – Grade II
- Official name: Dukes Theatre
- Designated: 22 December 1953
- Reference no.: 1211613

The Dukes is a theatre in Lancaster, England. It is the county's only producing theatre venue, and is an Arts Council England National Portfolio Organisation. As well as producing two theatre productions each year, it also hosts a varied programme of touring theatre, comedy, live music and dance. It also has a reputation for screening independent cinema and in 2017 won Northern Soul's Cinema of the Year Award.

== History ==
The venue opened as a theatre, under the name Duke's Playhouse, on 18 November 1971 in the former St Anne's Church, having undergone a year-long conversion costing approximately £180,000. The Queen, who also held the title of "Duke of Lancaster", gave her permission for the use of the name and the theatre was opened by Paymaster General and Minister for the Arts, Viscount Eccles.

== Auditoria ==
The theatre has three auditoria across two separate buildings. In the main building "The Rake" is the larger space seating approximately 313, with "The Round" studio space seating approximately 240. The Dukes Centre for Creative Learning, a short walk up Moor Lane, has its own dedicated space for youth and community projects and performances.

== Homegrown productions ==
The Dukes now produces only two productions each year, known as "homegrown productions": a "Park" show and a Christmas production. These are shows that are created almost entirely by the team at the theatre and over the years have included both new and existing work.

=== The Play in the Park ===
In 1987 The Dukes began producing annual open-air, walkabout theatre in Williamson Park each summer. The first production was A Midsummer Night's Dream which opened on 24 June and was the brainchild of then Artistic Director Johnathan Petherbridge and Theatre Administrator John Stalker. Andy Serkis, now an honorary patron of the theatre, appeared in the first "Play in the Park".

Since it began more than 500,000 people have seen a Dukes Park Show and the 2016 production of The Hobbit won Best Show for Children and Young People at the UK Theatre Awards. The Play in the Park is also thought to be the largest outdoor promenade theatre event in the UK.

=== Christmas production ===
The Dukes' Christmas production currently takes place in "The Round", although in the past it has also used "The Rake" stage. The Christmas production tends to vary from the usual pantomime formula but retains some audience participation elements. In recent years, under new Artistic Director Sarah Punshon, the show has also incorporated original music created by The Baghdaddies.

=== Other productions ===
As well as the Play in the Park and Christmas production, The Dukes produces at least one other homegrown show each year. Recently the theatre has taken the decision to produce shows which have a strong connection to their audiences and in 2017 created Blackout, which told the story of how Storm Desmond affected the Lancaster and Morecambe area.

== Creative Learning ==
As well as being a theatre and cinema for the general public, The Dukes also has its own Centre for Creative Learning which is based a short walk from the main theatre, further along Moor Lane. The Creative Learning arm of The Dukes organise a variety of projects with children, young people and adults, aiming to broaden access to the arts.

The Dukes' Young Company produce a show each year as well as making appearances in some of the other productions at the theatre including the Play in the Park. Notable former members of The Dukes' Young Company include Coronation Street actress Cherylee Houston who is now an honorary patron at the theatre.

In recent years The Dukes has been championing how the arts can improve the lives and mental well-being of people living with dementia through their three-year 'A Life More Ordinary' programme. A variety of activities including dementia friendly film screenings, which include an interval and live music accompaniment, and tailored participatory workshops were developed and shared with other cinemas and theatres across the country. The programme culminated in the 'Creative Adventures in Dementia' conference at The Dukes in May 2018.
