= Oldham Coliseum Theatre =

Theatre in England (1885–)

Coordinates: 53°32′33″N 2°6′29″W

- Interactive map of Oldham Coliseum Theatre
- Former names: Colosseum, Colosseum Super 'Talkie' Theatre
- Address: Fairbottom Street; Oldham; OL1 3SW
- Owner: Oldham Council
- Capacity: 580

Construction
- Opened: 16 June 1887
- Renovated: 1931; 1939; 1964–66; 1974; 2012; currently
- Architect: Thomas Whittaker

Website
- www.coliseum.org.uk

Oldham Coliseum Theatre is a theatre in Oldham, Greater Manchester, England. Located on Fairbottom Street in the town centre, it opened in 1887 as the Colosseum, a reconstruction of an 1885 wooden circus building, has since been rebuilt as a masonry building, and in the 20th century was a music hall and briefly a cinema before reverting to being a repertory theatre. It was closed in 2023 and was to be redeveloped, but is to reopen in 2027 after refurbishment.

== History ==
The theatre was constructed in 1885 as a timber building by the joiner Thomas Whittaker as a permanent home for Myer's Grand American Hippodrome Circus, on Henshaw Street. The circus owner was unable to pay for the work, so Whittaker took over ownership, and when the Henshaw Street site was proposed for redevelopment as a market, had the building dismantled and rebuilt on its present site in Fairbottom Street. It reopened there on 16 June 1887 with Culleen's Circus, as the Colosseum. The Era described it as being coated with fireproof paint and having a projecting balcony with loggia on the main façade, separate entrances for different classes of ticket holders, separate refreshment bars for the pit and the circle, and separate men's and women's cloakrooms. The stage was 42 feet (13 m) wide, one of the largest in England, and the auditorium had central air conditioning; the circus horses were stabled in a brick building and were brought to the stage through a passage under the gallery.

After relicensing as a theatre, the building had a second opening on 29 August 1887 with a performance of The Two Orphans. In 1903 it was purchased by Peter Yates, the owner of Yates's Wine Lodges, who converted it into a music hall. Performers who appeared there included Charlie Chaplin.

The Colosseum showed short films beginning in the 1900s, and in 1918 was sold to Dobie's Electric Theatres. In 1931 William Cedric Bailey purchased it and converted it into a cinema, the Colosseum Super 'Talkie' Theatre. The stage house was demolished and a projection box installed, and the façade was modernised. The cinema opened on 23 March 1931 with Two Worlds but was not a success and closed on 23 October 1931. After an auction of fittings together with scenery, props and costumes from the former theatre, it reopened on 26 October 1931 with two American films, Sea Devils and The Sunrise Trail, only to close permanently on 3 January 1932.

The building was disused until 1939, when Oldham Repertory Theatre Club leased it. They had the façade modernised by architects Armitage & Fazakerly, built new dressing rooms on the site of the stable block, and created a new stage out of part of the auditorium; the capacity was reduced from the original 3,000 to 670 (334 stalls, 206 circle and 130 gallery). It reopened in July 1939 as the Coliseum Theatre, initially a theatre club, later a public theatre. In 1946, capacity was 660 and the stage was 22 feet (6.7 m) wide. The building was renovated in 1964–66 to replace the remaining timber sections with masonry, remove the projection box, add a new proscenium and a safety curtain, and further modernise the exterior. In 1974, the stage house was rebuilt with a new fly tower and an orchestra pit was added.

Oldham Council acquired the Coliseum in 1977 and reopened it as a touring house. In 2012, it was refurbished and an extension was added housing an education studio and a café-bar.

In late 2022 Arts Council England announced the withdrawal of the Coliseum's annual grant; it was the largest theatre outside London to lose funding. On 14 February 2023 the board of trustees announced that running the theatre full time was no longer financially viable, so they were entering a period of consultation with the intention of closing at the end of March. The closure was confirmed in mid-March, and the last performance was Encore, on 31 March 2023. The council planned to replace the building with a smaller theatre at a cost of £24 million, but after a campaign led by actor Julie Hesmondhalgh, on 8 July 2024 it was announced that the Coliseum would instead be refurbished with £10 million in pledged funds, and would reopen by Christmas 2025. In June 2025 Oldham Council stated that the re-opening was to be delayed until 2026, but in July 2026 the works contractor warned that unexpected structural problems had set back completion until 2027. Oldham Council has committed to covering the extra £7m needed.

== Reputed haunting ==
In 1947, Harold Norman, playing the title role in Macbeth at the Coliseum, died of peritonitis after being stabbed by a genuine blade in a sword-fight scene; he had reportedly not observed the traditional superstitious safeguards concerning the play. His ghost is said to haunt the theatre, usually appearing on Thursdays, the day he was wounded. The Coliseum is featured in an episode of the TV series Most Haunted first broadcast on 16 November 2004.

Harold Norman supposedly now haunts Guide Bridge Theatre, Audenshaw after the theatre inherited The Coliseum's seats.
