= Walter Shaw Sparrow =

Welsh art and architecture writer (1862–1940)

- Born: 1862; Cymmau Hall, Flintshire, Wales
- Died: 11 March 1940 (aged 78)
- Occupations: Writer and art critic
- Known for: Books about British sporting artists

Walter Shaw Sparrow (1862–1940) was a Welsh writer on art and architecture, with a special interest in British sporting artists. He wrote a series of books on art, architecture and furniture.

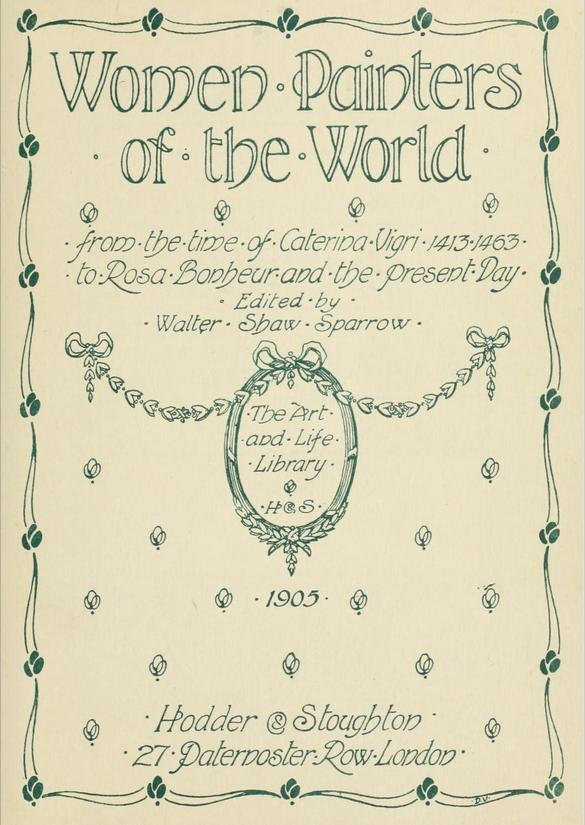
Title page of Women Painters of the World, 1905

== Biography ==
=== Childhood ===
Sparrow was born in 1862, the younger son of James Sparrow JP FGS (1824–1902) and his wife Caroline (1828–1904), of Gwersyllt Hill, near Wrexham, Wales. In 1855, James Sparrow had become proprietor of Ffrwd Works, a large colliery, ironworks and brickworks between Brymbo and Cefn-y-bedd, which he expanded into one of the most prominent businesses in North Wales. Sparrow in his boyhood got to know many of his father's colliers, furnacemen, blacksmiths, carpenters and farmworkers, and gained respect and admiration for the men, whom he described as "so big, strong, simple-hearted, and kind". He made a study of the cruel conditions endured by coal miners, and the fact that nationally over a thousand of them were killed every year in accidents. This engendered in him a desire to see fairness for working men.

Sparrow started school at Chester College, which he recounts as "devoted to science" and as opening his eyes to botany, chemistry and physiology. His early drawing lessons there were based on observation from nature. After Chester College he went to Newton Abbott College in South Devon, where Arthur Quiller-Couch was among his contemporaries. He distinguished himself with a first prize in political economy and with his drawing skills. He also expresses his admiration for the watercolour painting skills of the headmaster's wife, whom he got to know during an illness at the college.

During long school holidays at home in his early teens (1875–1879), he spent time with the professional artist William Joseph J. C. Bond, who was staying with the family. Bond painted in oils; Sparrow learnt techniques from him and insight into pigments and varnishes and problems with their stability. It was after discussions with Bond and with Walter's uncle, the architect George T. Robinson, that his father decided to approve Walter attending the Slade School of Fine Art in London, where he studied under artist Alphonse Legros for 15 months.

=== Adult life ===
In 1880, Sparrow's father sent him to the Académie Royale des Beaux-Arts in Brussels, under Jean-François Portaels, Joseph Stallaert and Joseph van Severdonck. Before entering, he made an artistic and historical tour of Belgium with his parents. He remained in Brussels for seven years, returning home for holidays. At van Severdonck's suggestion, he set up a small studio in Brussels, so that his support from home could be supplemented by earnings from drawing classes and English lessons, by selling a few paintings, and by submitting four articles approved by the editor Ponsonby Ogle for publication in The Globe newspaper.

Sparrow returned to London in the spring of 1888 and took two rooms in Kennington Park, initially with his brother Wilfrid. He took minor roles in theatre productions, including some Shakespeare plays, and joined F. R. Benson's Shakespeare company, whose leading ladies included Ada Ferrar, whom he would later marry, and Constance Featherstonhaugh.

In April 1891, Sparrow married the actress Ada Ferrar (born Ada Bishop, 1864–1951). The officers and workmen of the Ffrwd Works presented the couple with a "very chaste silvered tea and coffee service" with their best wishes. During the 1890s and into the 20th century, Ada continued to be prominent on the stage. Soon after their marriage, in May and June 1891, the magazine Theatre commended her performance as Alida in The Streets of London by Dion Boucicault at the Royal Adelphi Theatre in London. From 1896 to 1899 she took part in productions with a group of actors on an extended overseas tour, performing as far afield as Australia and New Zealand and returning to England in September 1899. Her performance as Mercia in Wilson Barrett's The Sign of the Cross was particularly well received.

The year 1899 proved a turning point for Sparrow. The Arts and Crafts Exhibition Society held a William Morris retrospective as their sixth exhibition at the New Gallery, Regent Street, London, for which Sparrow produced publicity in The Studio magazine. After the exhibition, he was appointed assistant art editor of The Studio and held for the next four-and-a-half years.

Sparrow's father died in 1902 and the Ffryd works closed in 1904 due to difficult business conditions. Little trace of the industrial complex remains.

After leaving The Studio, Sparrow founded and edited the Art and Life Library", writing a series of books on art, architecture and furniture over a period of more than 30 years, and contributing numerous articles to magazines and newspapers. Among his first was Women Painters of the World – still a useful work of reference. He much admired the work of Frank Brangwyn, who illustrated several of his books. In 1925 Sparrow's Memories of life and art through sixty years gave an account of his life, describing it as "discursive and somewhat unmethodical in treatment," but "not lacking in interest and entertainment, for Sparrow had met most of the most important figures in the professional circles of his time." However, he is best remembered for books on British sporting artists, and took delight in researching what he called "family news" from parish registers, wills and other documents, in the process discovering several errors in previously accepted information on them. His literary style has been said to create "a charmed sphere of refined diction and cultivated thought".

== Appreciation ==
Sparrow died on 11 March 1940 at the age of 78. After his death, his wife was awarded a £100 Civil list pension under the Civil List Act 1837 for the "writings of her husband, the late Walter Shaw Sparrow, on art and architecture". In 1942, Edward Croft-Murray gave five drawings of named racehorses by the 18th-century horse painter James Seymour to the British Museum "in memory of the late Walter Shaw Sparrow".

A 1903 biography of Lady Diana Beauclerk, the painter, was dedicated to him by Beatrice Erskine.

== Works ==
His books included the following, and he also wrote numerous magazine articles.

- 1904 – The British Home of To-Day
- 1904 – The Gospels in Art
- 1905 – The Old Testament in Art
- 1905 – Women Painters of the World
- 1905 – The Spirit of the Age
- 1906 – The Modern Home
- 1907 – Flats, Urban Houses and Cottage Homes
- 1908 – The English House
- 1908 – Old England
- 1909 – Our Homes and How to Make the Best of Them
- 1911 – Frank Brangwyn and His Work
- 1912 – John Lavery and His Work
- 1915 – A Book of Bridges
- 1919 – Prints and Drawings by Frank Brangwyn
- 1921 – The Fifth Army in March 1918
- 1922 – British Sporting Artists from Barlow to Herring
- 1923 – Angling in British art through five centuries
- 1924 – Advertising and British art
- 1925 – Memories of life and art through sixty years
- 1926 – A Book of British Etching
- 1926 – Brian Hatton – a young painter of genius killed in the War
- 1927 – Henry Alken
- 1929 – George Stubbs and Ben Marshall
- 1929 – Charles Towne
- 1931 – A Book of British Sporting Painters
- 1932 – John Boultbee, Thomas Weaver
- 1934 – A. Frederick Sandys
- 1937 – Studies in early Turf history
