= Ferrar =

Ferrar is a surname. Notable people with the surname include:

- Ada Ferrar (1867–1951), British actress
- Beatrice Ferrar (1876–1958), British actress
- Bill Ferrar (1893–1990), English mathematician
- Catherine Ferrar (born 1940), American television actress
- Hartley T. Ferrar (1879–1932), geologist who accompanied Captain Scott's first Antarctic expedition
- Jay Ferrar (born 1966), American songwriter and musician currently based in St. Louis, Missouri
- Leslie Ferrar, CVO (born 1955), Treasurer to Charles, Prince of Wales from January 2005 until July 2012
- Mary Ferrar (1551–1634), founder of religious community at Little Gidding in 1625
- Michael Lloyd Ferrar, CSI, CIE, OBE (1876–1967), British commissioner of the Penal Settlement at Port Blair on Andaman Islands and Nicobar Islands
- Miguel Ferrar (1955–2017), American actor and voice actor mostly known for villainous roles, notably Bob Morton
- Nicholas Ferrar (1592–1637), English scholar, courtier, businessman and man of religion
- Robert Ferrar (died 1555), Bishop of St David's in Wales
- William Hugh Ferrar (1826–1871), a Latinist, was a classical Irish scholar at Dublin University
- John Ferrar Holms (1897–1934), British literary critic born in India to a British civil servant and an Irish mother

== See also ==
- Ferrar Fenton Bible, one of the earliest translations of the Bible into "modern English"
- Ferrar Cluj-Napoca a football club, from Cluj-Napoca, that played both in the Hungarian and the Romanian Championship
- Sundberg & Ferrar, industrial design consultancy headquartered in Walled Lake, Michigan
- Ferrar Glacier, a glacier in Antarctica
- Ferrar Group or Family 13, a group of Greek Gospel manuscripts varying in date from the 11th to the 15th century
- Karoo-Ferrar, a major geologic province consisting of flood basalt, which mostly covers South Africa and Antarctica
- Ferrara
- Ferrari
- Ferraria
- Ferrario
- Ferraro
- Ferraroa
