= Cultural depictions of Henry II of England =

Henry II ruled as King of England from 1154 to 1189 and at various times he also partially controlled Scotland, Wales, Ireland and the Duchy of Brittany. He has been depicted in various cultural media.

== Theatre and film ==
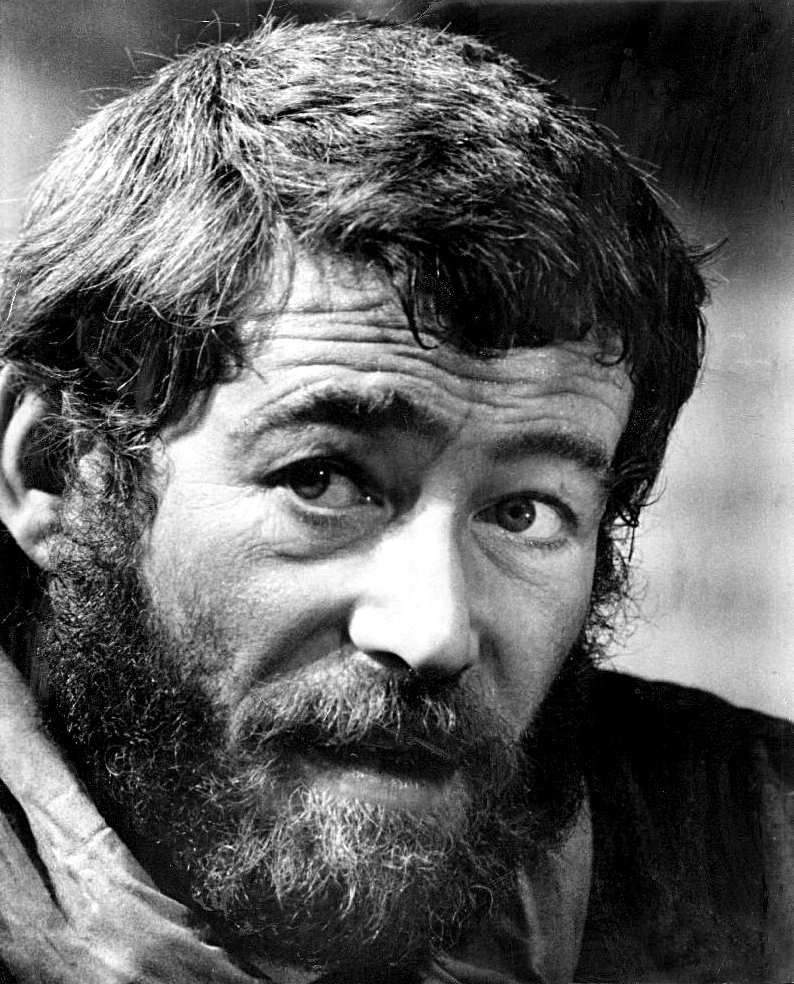
Peter O'Toole as King Henry II in The Lion in Winter (1968)

Henry II appears as a character in several modern plays and films. He is a central character in James Goldman's 1966 play The Lion in Winter, set in 1183 and presenting an imaginary encounter between Henry's immediate family and Philip Augustus over Christmas at Chinon. The 1968 film adaptation communicates the modern popular view of Henry as a somewhat sacrilegious, fiery and determined king although, as Goldman acknowledges, Henry's passions and character are essentially fictional. The Lion in Winter has proved to be an enduring representation of Henry, being turned into an Academy-Award-winning film and remade in 2003 for television.

The relationship between Henry and Thomas Becket has been a rich source for dramatic interpretation, for example as early as 1923 in the film Becket. In the play Becket by Jean Anouilh, (filmed in 1964), the character of the King is deliberately fictitious, driven by the need to enhance the drama between them. The Becket controversy also forms the basis for T. S. Eliot's play Murder in the Cathedral, where the tensions between Henry and Becket allow a discussion of the more superficial events of Becket's death and Eliot's deeper religious interpretation of the episode. Murder in the Cathedral was adapted for a feature film in 1951, directed by George Hoellering: in this version Alexander Gauge played Henry.

Henry II appears as a character in the 1884 play Becket by Alfred, Lord Tennyson. In the 1924 adaption of Tennyson's Becket, A.V. Bramble played Henry II.

Beth Flintoff has written a trilogy of plays which feature Henry II, his mother Matilda and grandfather Henry I . These are fictionalised accounts of historic events. The first, Henry I of England, sets the scene by including the foundation of Reading Abbey in 1121 and the second Matilda the Empress shows the future Henry II as a child during The Anarchy period after Henry I's death when Matilda and her cousin Stephen were rivals for the succession. In the concluding part, Henry II, which was first performed in October 2018 at Reading's Minster Church of St Mary the Virgin, the king is the main focus. The action of the play is set over the Easter weekend of 1164 when Thomas Becket officiated at the dedication of the then-complete Abbey, of which Henry II was an important patron.

== Historical fiction and television drama ==
- Walter Scott wrote a novel The Betrothed (1825), which features Henry II as a character.
- Thomas Miller wrote a three-volume historical romance Fair Rosamond; or The Days of King Henry II, first published in 1839.
- Catherine Maberly's 1851 novel The Lady and the Priest is about Henry and his relationships with his mistress Rosamund Clifford, and his antagonist, Thomas à Becket.
- Howard Pyle's 1883 novel The Merry Adventures of Robin Hood features Henry as an enemy of Robin. Following the archery match at Finsbury Fields, Henry attempts to capture him until Queen Eleanor intervenes and persuades Henry to give up the chase.
- Henry Bailey's novel The Fool, published in 1921, focused on the young Henry II.
- Alfred Duggan's novel God and My Right (1955) revolves around the conflict between Henry and Thomas à Becket.
- In 1978, the BBC broadcast The Devil's Crown, a thirteen-part series dramatising the reigns of Henry II and two of his sons.
- Ken Follett's novel The Pillars of the Earth, published in 1989, features Henry II. The Pillars of the Earth became his best-selling work and was adapted as a television miniseries and a video game
- Sharon Penman has written several novels in her Plantagenet series about Henry II and his wife Eleanor of Aquitaine
- Ariana Franklin's Mistress of the Art of Death historical crime series, comprising Mistress of the Art of Death (2007), The Death Maze (UK), published as The Serpent's Tale in the US (2008), Relics of the Dead (UK), published as Grave Goods in the US (2009), and The Assassin's Prayer (UK), published as A Murderous Procession in the US (2010) includes Henry as character. He is depicted as a headstrong but wise king, concerned with the welfare of his people, reforming the legal system, and maximizing tax revenue.
- Elizabeth Chadwick has written a series mainly concerned with Eleanor of Acquitaine in which Henry II is a major character
- Alison Weir has written a biography of Eleanor of Aquitaine, and a novel The Captive Queen (2010) based on this work. The Captive Queen features Eleanor's relationship with Henry as part of its plot.
- In the video game Age of Empires II HD: The African Kingdoms, Henry II featured as a two-handed swordsman.
- Several characters from George R. R. Martin’s fantasy series A Song of Ice and Fire (which is based on Medieval England) draw inspiration from Henry II, most notably Jaehaerys Targaryen and Aegon Targaryen III. King Jaehaerys, whose reign is described at length in the in-universe history textbook Fire & Blood, takes on some elements from Henry’s life. Both men came to the throne after a civil war nearly tore the realm apart and managed to put it back together, spent a significant portion of their rule on the move touring their kingdoms, modernized their governments to great success, but as they grew older saw their many significant achievements come under threat from familial strife with their wives and numerous children. Aegon Targaryen III, son of Rhaenyra Targaryen serves as an analogue to the resolution of The Anarchy, the civil war fought between Henry’s mother Matilda and her cousin Stephen. Both Henry and Aegon were the son of the rightful female heir to the throne who was usurped by a male relative and then inherited the crown due to a lack of suitable candidates, retroactively validating their mothers’ claim to the throne.
