= Macbeth (1911 film) =

1911 film directed by William Barker

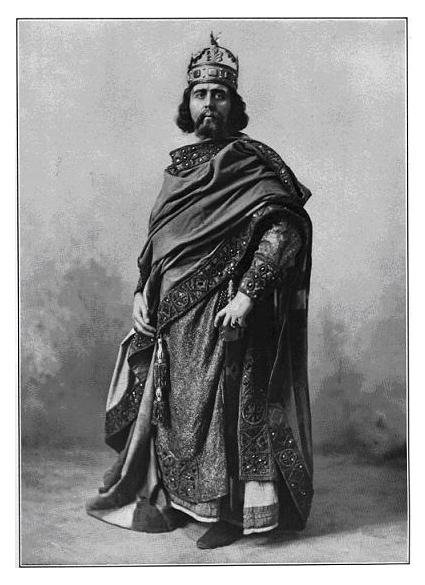
E.H. Sothern as Macbeth for the 1911 Broadway production

Macbeth is a 1911 film adaptation of the William Shakespeare play Macbeth; no prints are known to exist. Like all films of the time, it is silent and black-and-white, with English intertitles; it ran for 14 minutes.

== Main cast and crew ==
- William Barker (Director)
- Frank Benson as Macbeth; Benson had directed the play during nine seasons between 1896 and 1911
- Constance Benson as Lady Macbeth
- Murray Carrington
- Guy Rathbone
