= Der Heilige =

Short historical novel by Conrad F. Meyer

Der Heilige (The Saint; 1879) is a short historical novel by Conrad F. Meyer derived from the story of Thomas Becket and Henry II of England.

== Description ==
The novel is about the length of Silas Marner, and is centered on the great quarrel between Henry II and his Chancellor and Primate of England, Thomas Becket. Although in a broad sense based on history, its psychology is fancifully developed from a medieval legend found by Meyer in 1853 in Thierry's Histoire de la Conquête de l'Angleterre par les Normands (History of the Conquest of England by the Normans; 1825, Book IX), according to which Becket was the son of an Englishman and of the sister of the Kalif of Cordova.

The story of Henry's amours with beautiful Rosamond Clifford in the hidden bower suggested the secret palace in which Meyer's Becket rears his daughter Grace to save her from royal lechery. The accidental slaying of Grace after her seduction by the king inspires in Becket a deep-laid plot for revenge under the veil of pretended loyalty and later of saintly devotion when he becomes Primate on Henry's nomination, whereby he drives the king to alternate fits of despair and fury over the loss of political advantages and of the love of his queen and sons. The tragic ending is historical. The story is put in the mouth of a Swiss bowman, who is supposed to have come on his wanderings to London, where he entered the service of the king and was a minor actor in all the events he relates. The style is vivid, swift and powerful, and the diction of wonderful force and color, suggestive of a Gobelin tapestry, or as Keller said, “brocade.” It is Meyer's most finished production, possibly his best. The English reader will find it curious to compare it with Tennyson's Becket.

== Editions ==
The 66th printing appeared in Leipzig in 1913. Carl E. Eggert has edited the American School Edition (New York, 1907, with critical introduction).
