= Beatrice Ferrar =

British actress (1875–1958)

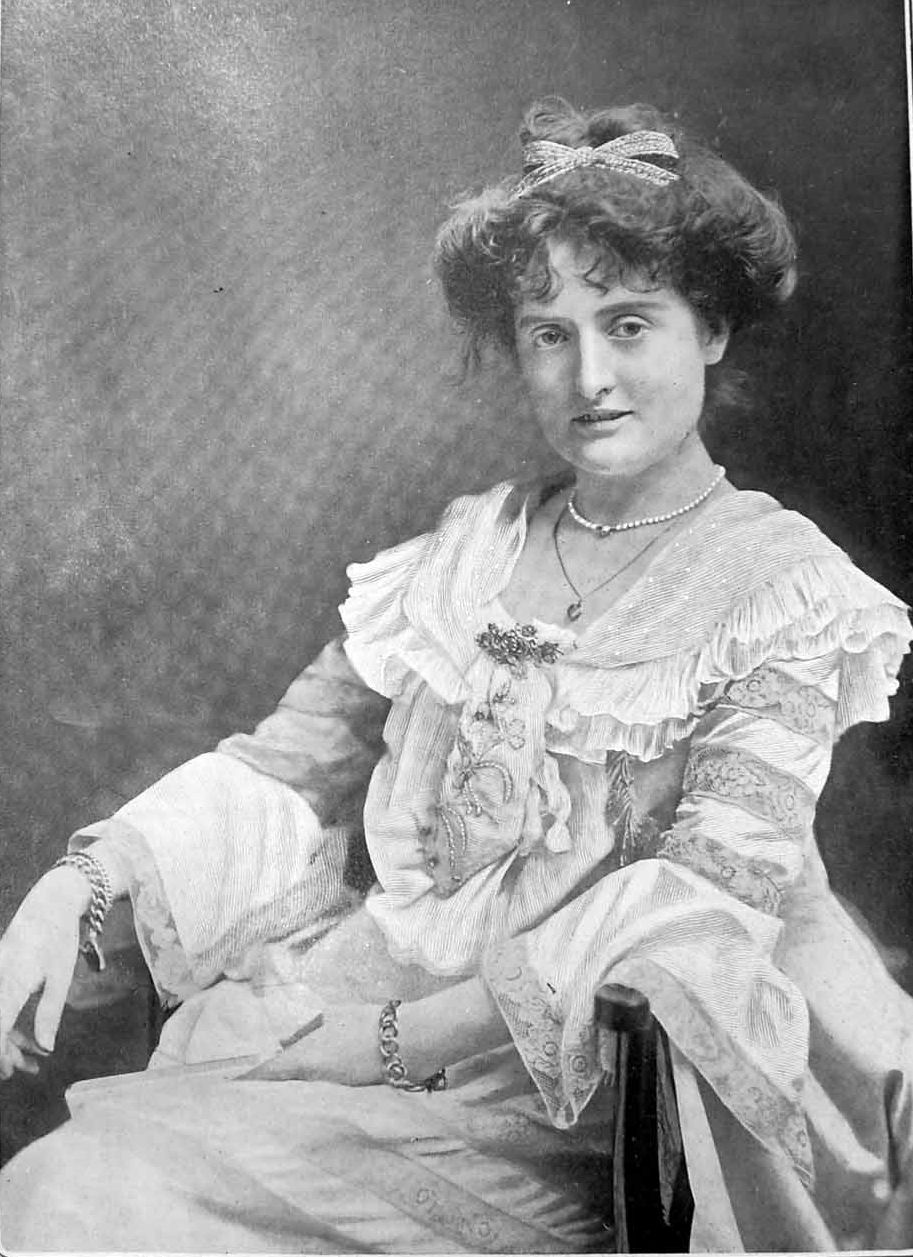
Beatrice Ferrar - The Tatler (1903)

Beatrice Ferrar (25 March 1875 – 12 February 1958) was a British actress who made a speciality of playing in 18th-century dramas.

== Early life ==
Born in St Pancras in London in 1875 as Flora Beatrice Bishop to Mary S. Bishop (1836-) and Charles R. Bishop (1814–), the Managing Clerk to a firm of solicitors, she was one of three actress sisters which included Ada Ferrar (1864–1951) and Jessie Ferrar (a.k.a. Marion Bishop, 1879–1950).

She followed Ada the oldest sibling on to the stage, making an early appearance as a fairy for Frank Benson and played Richard, Duke of York in Richard III. She played Fanny Bunter in Tom Taylor's New Men and Old Acres.

== Stage career ==
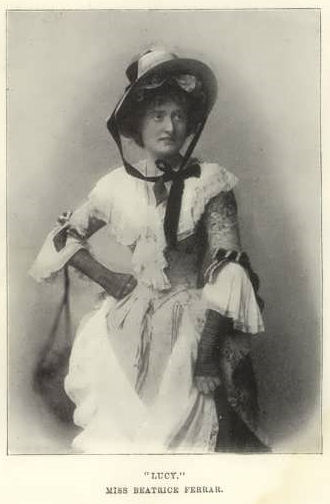
As Lucy in a revival of The Rivals at the Haymarket Theatre - The Sketch (1900)

Ferrar made her London début aged 15 in 1890 as one of the Two Young Zephyrs in The Bride of Love at the Adelphi Theatre in a production that included her sister Ada Ferrar before appearing as the 12-year-old Tow Tow in Sweet Nancy at the Lyric Theatre, playing the title role for three weeks during the run. She joined the company of John Hare to play Beatrix Brent in Lady Bountiful at the Garrick Theatre (1891). She appeared as Milly opposite H. B. Irving in T. W. Robertson's School at the Garrick Theatre (1891), and was the precocious schoolgirl Mildred Selwyn opposite H. B. Irving in Sydney Grundy's A Fool's Paradise at the Garrick Theatre (1892). She was at the Comedy Theatre as Mrs. Robert Briscoe in The Sportsman (1892) and was Grace Walters in The Great Unpaid (1892) before playing a number of roles for Hare, Winifred Fortescue and Edward Terry on tour. With Edward Terry she acted in Love in Idleness (1896), and played the emotional child Lisa in The Squire of Dames opposite Charles Wyndham at the Criterion Theatre (1895) and Georgiana Ridout in The Matchmaker at the Shaftesbury Theatre (1896). She appeared in Gertrude Warden and John Wilton Jones's one act play A Woman's Proper Place (1896).

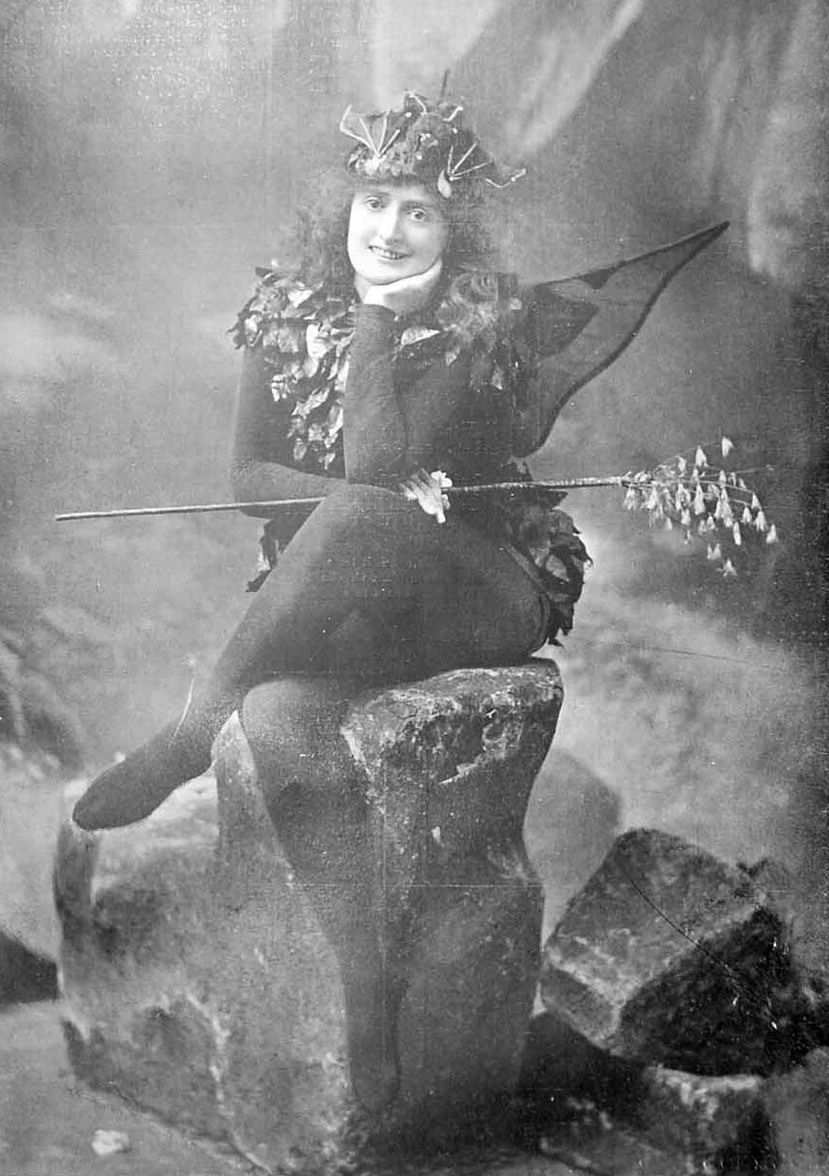
As Puck in A Midsummer Night's Dream at the Adelphi Theatre (1905)

She was Irene opposite Charles Hawtrey in One Summer's Day at the Comedy Theatre (1898); Florry Larkins in a revival of The Club Baby at the Avenue Theatre (1898); and Pamela Beechinor in The Manoeuvres of Jane at the Haymarket Theatre (1899).

Her obvious ladylike qualities somewhat prevented her from convincingly playing the vulgar music hall singer Maud St. Trevor in Hearts Are Trumps at the Theatre Royal, Drury Lane (1899) but she had more success as Lucy in The Rivals opposite Cyril Maude and as Miss Constance Neville in Oliver Goldsmith’s She Stoops to Conquer, both at the Haymarket Theatre (1900) with The Era saying of her performance in the latter, "Miss Beatrice Ferrar’s Miss Neville was younger and more hoydenish than is customary; but, in practice, this proved an advantage ... In the more serious passages of the part Miss Ferrar showed how keenly acute she is by nice enunciation and by sufficiently subduing her vivacity..."

Ferrar played Lisa opposite H. B. Irving in The Twin Sister at the Duke of York's Theatre (1902); Dolly Banter in What Would a Gentleman Do? at the Apollo Theatre (1892); Praline in the farce The Girl from Maxim's at the Criterion Theatre (1902); Miss Sterling opposite Allan Aynesworth in The Clandestine Wedding at the Haymarket Theatre (1903); Amy Spencer opposite Cyril Maude in Cousin Kate at the Playhouse Theatre (1903); Mrs. Harry Tavender in Joseph Entangled (1904) at the Haymarket Theatre; Puck in A Midsummer Night's Dream at the Adelphi Theatre (1905) opposite Oscar Asche as Bottom and Roxy Barton as Titania; Miss Pellender opposite Cyril Maude and Winifred Emery in The Superior Miss Pellender at the Waldorf Theatre (1906); Miss Neville opposite Cyril Maude and Winifred Emery in She Stoops to Conquer at the Waldorf Theatre (1906); Lucy opposite Lewis Waller in The Rivals at the Lyric Theatre (1910); and Boyne in Herbert Beerbohm Tree's star-studded production of The Critic opposite Laurence Irving, Marie Tempest and Gertie Millar among others at His Majesty's Theatre (1911). In 1912 she was touring the provinces as Lucienne Bocard in The Glad Eye.

== Later years ==
In her later years she lived in London with her younger sister, Jessie. In the 1939 England Register, she was listed as "Actress" and her sister Jessie as "Wholesale Milliner".

Beatrice Ferrar died in 1958 in London. In her will she left an estate valued at £2,451 6s 3d. She never married.
