= Lydia Kyasht =

Russian-British ballet dancer and teacher (1885–1959)

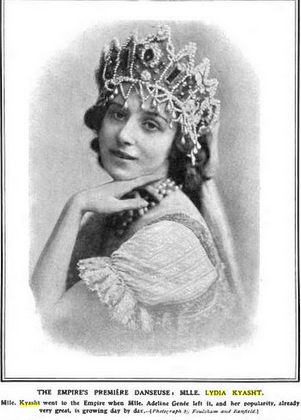
- Lydia Kyasht, from a 1909 publication.
- Born: Lydia Georgievna Kyasht; 25 March 1885; Saint Petersburg, Russia
- Died: 11 January 1959 (aged 73)
- Occupation: Ballerina

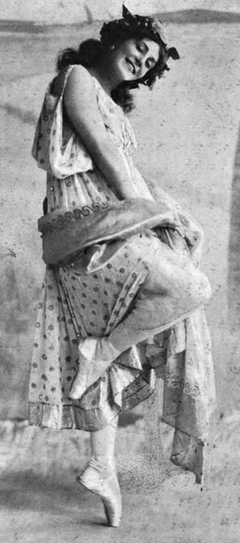
Lydia Kyasht, from a 1912 publication.

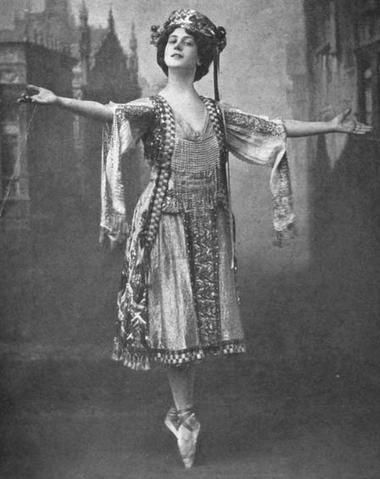
Lydia Kyasht, from a 1912 publication.

Lydia Georgievna Kyasht (Russian: Лидия Георгиевна Кякшт; 25 March 1885 — 11 January 1959) was a Russian-British ballerina and dance teacher. She was described by one critic as "the World's Most Beautiful Dancer" in 1914.

== Early life ==
Lydia Georgievna Kyasht was born in St. Petersburg, the daughter of George Kyasht and Agaffia Poubiloff. Her older brother George Kyasht also had a successful career in ballet. She trained as a dancer at the St. Petersburg Imperial Ballet School.

== Career ==
Kyaksht danced at the Mariinsky Theatre from 1902 to 1908, and was a soloist with the Bolshoi Ballet in 1903–1904. She moved to England in 1908, to be ballerina at the Empire Theatre. She also danced with the Ballets Russes. Her first performance in New York City happened in 1914, when she appeared in a Broadway revue called The Whirl of the World.

She appeared in at least two silent films, Foolish Monte Carlo (also titled The Black Spider, 1920, now lost), and The Dance of the Moods (1924). In 1929 she published a memoir, Romantic Reflections.

Kyasht opened a ballet school in London after World War I. During World War II, her company of young dancers, Ballet de la Jeunesse Anglaise, made several tours.

== Personal life ==
Lydia Kyaksht married Alexis A. Ragosin, a military officer from St. Petersburg. Their daughter Lydia Kyasht Jr. was also a dancer, and a choreographer, who inherited her mother's role as director of the Cirencester Dance Club.

Lydia Kyaksht was widowed in 1954, and died in 1959, aged 72 years. Papers related to her ballet company are archived in the Victoria and Albert Museum's Theatre and Performance collection.
