= Ponsonby Ogle =

British writer and journalist (1855-1902)

- Born: 8 December 1855; Bishopsteignton, Newton Abbot, Devon, England
- Died: 17 December 1902 (aged 47); Milan, Italy
- Occupations: Writer, journalist and editor

Ponsonby Dugmore Ogle (8 December 1855 – 17 December 1902) was a British writer and journalist, and for a time was editor of The Globe newspaper in London. Later in life he was mistakenly reputed to own a large baronial estate in Massachusetts.

== Biography ==
Ogle was born into a well-known English family in Bishopsteignton, near Newton Abbot, Devon, England, on 8 December 1855. He was the second son of Rev. William Reynolds Ogle, Vicar of Bishopsteignton, and had American ancestry on his mother's side. He was educated at Winchester College from 1869, then New College, Oxford from 1876 to 1879, graduating with a BA degree. He worked as private secretary to the Archbishop of Canterbury from 1881.

The Globe was the oldest of the London evening newspapers, having been founded in 1803, and in 1871 Captain George C. H. Armstrong (1836–1907) became editor. Ogle took over the role from him in 1886, and was editor until Algernon Locker took control in 1891. During his editorship, Ogle published four short articles by the young Walter Shaw Sparrow, who was later to become a popular and prolific writer.

On 9 July 1891 he married Miss Kate Angeline Rand of Minneapolis, Minnesota, the second daughter of Alonzo Cooper Rand. They spent some time in Minneapolis during October 1891 then stayed with friends in New Haven, Connecticut, returning to Minneapolis in mid-December. Ogle was among those injured in a serious railroad accident at Lima, Ohio on Wednesday 16 December, when a derailment of his train at speed caused four fatalities and numerous injuries, with Ogle suffering cuts to the head.

Ogle and his wife visited America again in 1897, visiting Coronado, California in January and San Francisco at the beginning of March. They sailed from San Francisco to Hawaii on 4 March and spent some time there.

During their life together, they made a number of visits to the United States, and during one visit Ogle bought a farm in The Berkshires, Massachusetts. Described as a "plain, every-day New England farm", it consisted of about two hundred acres and in 1903, after his death, it was valued at $30,000 in the inventory filed in the Probate Court. However, his purchase became the subject of a story printed by a country editor, and soon Ogle gained a totally unfounded reputation as proprietor of five thousand acres, on which, it was said, he was going to create a traditional English country estate. Some reports exaggerated his wealth even further: an Irish newspaper claimed he had bought twenty thousand acres, "to be laid out after the style of an English park, with a game preserve and other features". Try as he might, Ogle was unable to explode this myth and dispel his widespread fame as the owner of a baronial estate, fame that preceded him wherever he went.

After what would turn out to be his final visit to the United States in 1902, he and his wife sailed for Liverpool, England on 19 November 1902 on the steamer RMS Oceanic. He died of pneumonia on 17 December 1902 in Milan, Italy, at the age of 47. In March the following year his widow returned to the United States and to her family. She lived into her late eighties and died in New York on 15 January 1950.

== Works ==
Ogle wrote many pieces for The Globe, and also a number of poems. An anthology of his poetry and prose was published in 1908:

- Ponsonby Ogle (1908). E. G. B (ed.). Selections from the writings of Ponsonby Ogle (PDF). New York: Brentano's.

This book is still in print.

In the introduction to the book the editor writes of "the peculiar charm of [Ogle's] personality" and his "gallant bearing, his keen, yet kindly wit, his whimsical humor, [and] his unfailing loyalty to old associates and old associations". He continues, "He deliberately chose to explore the byways of life rather than to plod the beaten track; of the average man's ambition he had none – but, then, he was not the average man … he was something much more than that."
