= The Great Day =

1920 film

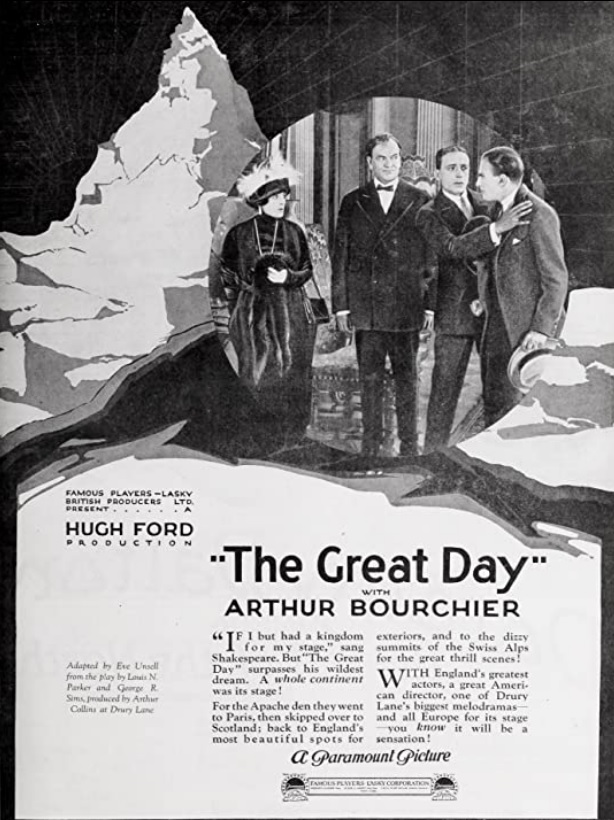
- American advertisement for The Great Day (1920)
- Directed by: Hugh Ford
- Written by: Louis N. Parker (play); George R. Sims; Eve Unsell
- Starring: Arthur Bourchier
- Cinematography: Hal Young
- Production company: Famous Players–Lasky British
- Distributed by: Paramount Pictures
- Release date: November 1920
- Country: United Kingdom
- Language: Silent with English intertitles

The Great Day is a 1920 British drama film directed by Hugh Ford. Alfred Hitchcock is credited as a title designer. On 17 April 1921, Paramount Pictures released the film in the US at five reels (roughly 50 minutes). The film is now considered to be a lost film.

== Plot ==
As described in a film publication, Frank Beresford and Clara Borstwick have married against the wishes of her father, Sir John Borstwick. Immediately following the marriage, Lillian Leeson, to whom Frank had formerly been married, appears with the intent to blackmail. Frank had told Clara of the former marriage and had believed that Lillian was dead. Frank goes to Paris to find a former friend that he believed to be dead who was a former husband of Lillian. He recognizes Dave Leeson and they return to England. Dave frustrates the attempt by Lillian to spoil Frank's happiness, and there is a reconciliation with Clara.

== Cast ==
- Arthur Bourchier as Sir John Borstwick
- May Palfrey as Lady Borstwick
- Marjorie Hume as Clara Borstwick
- Bertram Burleigh as Frank Beresford
- Adeline Hayden Coffin as Mrs. Beresford (as Mrs. Hayden Coffin)
- Percy Standing as Paul Nikola
- Meggie Albanesi as Lillian Leeson
- Geoffrey Kerr as Dave Leeson
- Lewis Dayton as Lord Medway

== See also ==
- Alfred Hitchcock filmography
- List of lost films
