= Julius Knight =

English stage actor

Julius Knight (1863 – 1941) was an English stage actor, a favourite of audiences in Australia, where he played in more seasons than any other star actor. His greatest successes were: Monsieur Beaucaire in which he took the title role, W. G. Wills' A Royal Divorce as Napoleon, and The Sign of the Cross in which he played Marcus Superbus.

== History ==
Knight was born in Dumfries, Scotland, and educated at Forfar Academy, alma mater of J. M. Barrie. There were no actors in the family, but he was attracted by an advertisement for a lad who could "dress decently". He ended up in Charles Hawtrey's company.

He first played Australia with the Laura Villiers company in the second half of 1891 to good notices. though the tour was not a success.

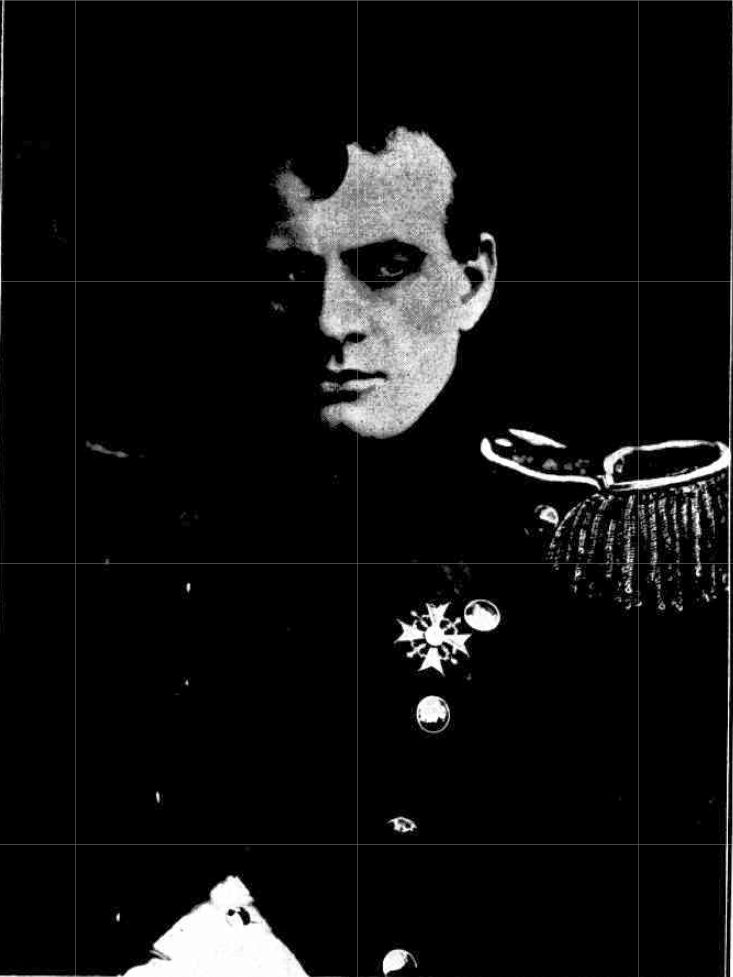
Julius Knight as Napoleon

He was then engaged by Sir Augustus Harris to create the character of Julian Bedford in Pettitt's The Prodigal Daughter at Drury Lane and the following year he took the same part to New York. While there he was noticed by Sir Henry Irving, who engaged him to play Valentin in Faust at the Lyceum Theatre, London. He remained with Irving for three seasons.

Apparently he found his metier as he returned to Australia in February 1897 with Ada Ferrar in The Prisoner of Zenda and The Sign of the Cross, a successful tour that ran to December 1899. He was reportedly offered a huge salary to remain but returned "home" with an inflated opinion of his histrionic power, but was soon cut down to size. He returned to Australia in October 1903 and played Napoleon in A Royal Divorce for a year. He returned with much the same programme in March 1905, then in March 1906 with The Sign of the Cross. Eight more tours followed. His tour of 1915 was predicted to be his last, as he was playing at every town possible. but he returned in July 1916 with A Royal Divorce, saying farewell in November 1916, prefiguring his retirement from the stage.

Randolph Bedford had some cruel words to say about Australia's slavish adoration of the English in general and Knight in particular:

Holt's, and other Australian managers', plays see the light at a seaport town like Liverpool . . . anything that has a moderate success—and it's easy to have a success if you pay starvation wages to your actors— . . . and is then brought along to the Australians. In this as in all other things, we in Australia must get away from this superstitious liking for all things English. Julius Knight, boomed in Australia as a "great English actor", was a cheap provincial and suburban man, and is so still.

He did however return to Australia in 1923 for Harry Musgrove, in Charles Eddy's one-act play Honour is Satisfied.
