= The Black Spider (1920 film) =

1920 British film by William Humphrey

- Directed by: William Humphrey
- Written by: Carlton Dawe (novel); George Edwardes-Hall; William Humphrey
- Produced by: Edward Godal
- Starring: Mary Clare; Bertram Burleigh; Ronald Colman
- Cinematography: William Shenton
- Production company: British and Colonial Films
- Distributed by: Butcher's Film Service; Robertson-Cole Distributing Corporation (US)
- Release date: May 1920
- Country: United Kingdom
- Language: English

The Black Spider is a 1920 British silent mystery film directed by William Humphrey and starring Mary Clare, Bertram Burleigh, and Ronald Colman. It is an adaptation of the 1911 novel of the same name by Carlton Dawe. The film was partly shot on location in Monte Carlo.

== Plot ==
A series of robberies have been committed against wealthy inhabitants of Monaco by a thief known as 'The Black Spider'. A young woman steals her aunt's jewels as a joke, pretending to be the Black Spider, but a detective is soon on her trail.

== Cast ==
- Mary Clare as Angela Brentwood
- Lydia Kyasht as Angela Carfour
- Bertram Burleigh as Archie Lowndes
- Sam Livesey as Reggie Cosway
- Robert Corbins as Archie Lowndes
- Ronald Colman as Vicomte de Beaurais
- Betty Hall as Irene Carfour
- Hayden Coffin as Lord Carfour
- Adeline Hayden Coffin as Lady Carfour
- Dorothy Cecil as Marjorie West

== Bibliography ==
- Low, Rachael. The History of British Film, Volume 4 1918-1929. Routledge, 1997.
