= Richard III (1911 film) =

Very early British Shakespeare film

- Directed by: Frank Benson
- Written by: William Shakespeare
- Based on: Richard III by William Shakespeare
- Starring: Frank Benson
- Cinematography: Will Barker
- Production company: Co-Operative Cinematograph Company
- Release date: 1911
- Running time: 23 minutes
- Country: United Kingdom
- Language: Silent

Richard III is a 1911 silent film adaptation of William Shakespeare's play, directed by and starring Frank Benson as Richard III. The film was produced by Co-Operative Cinematograph Company.

== Cast ==
- Frank Benson as Richard, Duke of Gloucester
- Constance Benson [Lady Anne]
- James Berry [King Henry VI]
- Alfred Brydone [King Edward IV]
- Violet Farebrother [Queen Elizabeth]
- Elinor Aickin [Duchess of York]
- Kathleen Yorke [Edward, Prince of Wales / King Edward V]
- Hetty Kenyon [Richard, Duke of York]
- Eric Maxon [Henry, Earl of Richmond / King Henry VII]
- Moffat Johnston [Duke of Buckingham]
- Murray Carrington [George, Duke of Clarence]
- James MacLean [Duke of Norfolk]
- Victor McClure [Earl of Surrey, his son]

== Survival ==
The film survives in the British Film Institute National Archive film archive and has been released on DVD

== Academic analysis ==
The film has been analysed academically. The University of York notes that the film is rare. The film was recorded from the stage at the Shakespeare Memorial Theatre in Stratford.
