= Conrad Ferdinand Meyer =

Swiss poet and historical novelist (1825–1898)

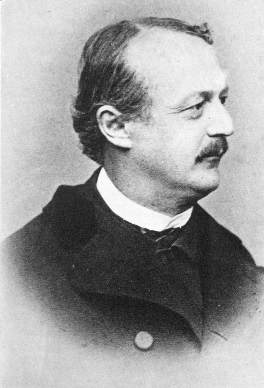
- Born: 11 October 1825; Zürich, Switzerland
- Died: 28 November 1898 (aged 73); Kilchberg, Switzerland
- Citizenship: 1867-1887
- Occupations: Poet, historical novelist
- Writing career
- Language: German
- Genres: Poetic realism, expressionism, comic novel, historical fiction

Conrad Ferdinand Meyer (11 October 1825 – 28 November 1898) was a Swiss poet and historical novelist, a master of literary realism who is mainly remembered for stirring narrative ballads like "Die Füße im Feuer" (The Feet in the Fire).

== Biography ==
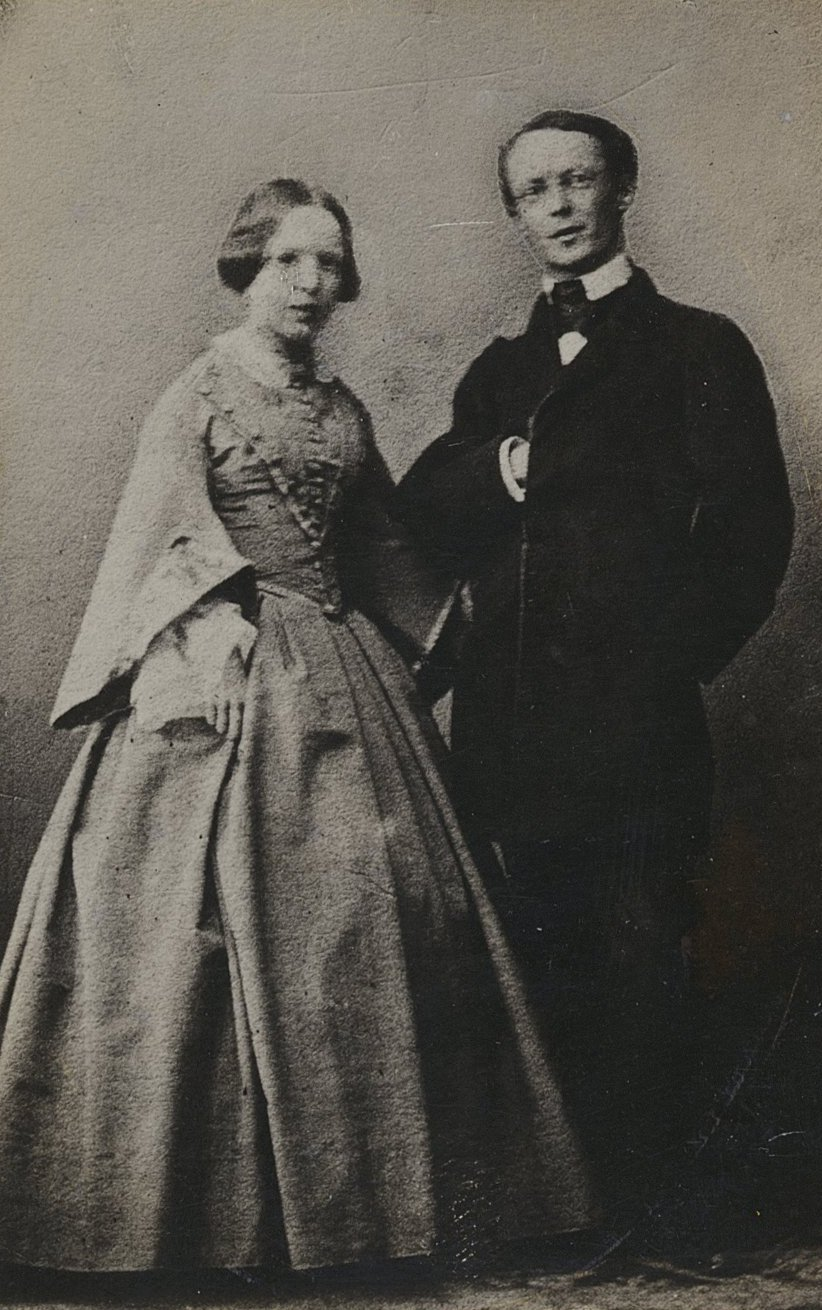
Conrad Ferdinand Meyer with his younger sister Betsy, around 1855

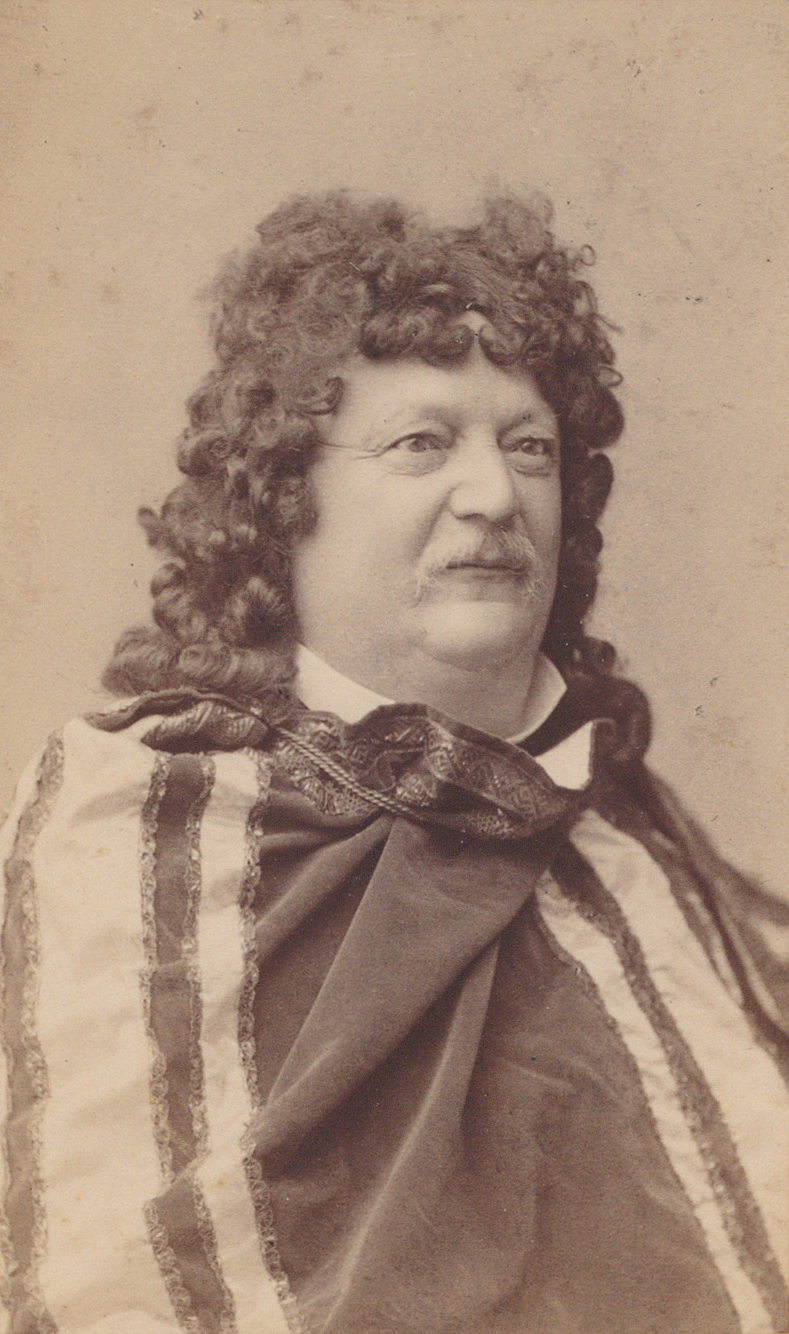
Conrad Ferdinand Meyer in a costume, around 1883

Meyer was born in Zürich. His father, who died early, was a statesman and historian, while his mother was a highly cultured woman. Throughout his childhood two traits were observed that later characterized the man and the poet: he had a most scrupulous regard for neatness and cleanliness, and he lived and experienced more deeply in memory than in the immediate present. He suffered from bouts of mental illness, sometimes requiring hospitalization; his mother, similarly but more severely afflicted, killed herself.

Having finished the gymnasium, he took up the study of law, but history and the humanities were of greater interest to him. He went for considerable periods to Lausanne, Geneva, Paris, and Italy, where he interested himself in historical research. The two historians who influenced Meyer particularly were Louis Vulliemin at Lausanne and Jacob Burckhardt at Basel, whose book on the Culture of the Renaissance stimulated his imagination and interest. From his travels in France and Italy (1857) Meyer derived much inspiration for the settings and characters of his historical novels. In 1875, he settled at Kilchberg, above Zürich.

Meyer found his calling only late in life; for many years, being practically bilingual, he wavered between French and German. The Franco-Prussian War brought the final decision. In Meyer's novels, a great crisis often releases latent energies and precipitates a catastrophe. In the same manner, his own life which before the war had been one of dreaming and experimenting, was stirred to the very depths by the events of 1870. Meyer identified himself with the German cause, and as a manifesto of his sympathies published the little epic Hutten's Last Days in 1871. After that his works appeared in rapid succession. In 1880, he received an honorary doctorate from the University of Zurich. He died in his home in Kilchberg on 28 November 1898, aged 73.

== Works ==
His works were collected into eight volumes in 1912.

=== Novels ===
The periods of the Renaissance and Counter Reformation furnished the subjects for most of his novels. Most of his plots spring from the deeper conflict between freedom and fate and culminate in a dramatic crisis in which the hero, in the face of a great temptation, loses his moral freedom and is forced to fulfill the higher law of destiny.

- 1876 Jürg Jenatsch – Graubünden, Thirty Years' War, a story of Switzerland in the 17th century through the conflict between Spain-Austria and France. The hero is a Protestant minister and fanatic patriot who, in his determination to preserve the independence of his little country, does not shrink from murder and treason and in whom noble and base motives are strangely blended.
- 1891 Angela Borgia – Italian Renaissance

=== Novellas ===
Meyer's main works are historical novellas:

- 1873 Das Amulett (The Amulet) – France during the St. Bartholomew's Day Massacre
- 1878 Der Schuss von der Kanzel (The Shot from the Pulpit) – Switzerland
- 1879 Der Heilige (The Saint) – Thomas Becket, Middle Ages, England
- 1881 Plautus im Nonnenkloster (Plautus in the Nunnery) – Renaissance, Switzerland
- 1882 Gustav Adolfs Page (Gustav Adolf's Page) – Thirty Years' War
- 1883 Das Leiden eines Knaben (The Suffering of a Boy) - France during reign of Louis XIV
- 1884 Die Hochzeit des Mönchs (The Wedding of the Monk) – Italy, Dante himself is introduced at the court of Cangrande in Verona as narrator of the strange adventure of a monk who, after the death of his brother, is forced by his father to break his vows but who, instead of marrying the widow, falls in love with another young girl and runs blindly to his fate.
- 1885 Die Richterin (The Judge) – Carolingian time, Grisons, introduces Charlemagne and his palace school
- 1887 Die Versuchung des Pescara (The Temptation of Pescara) – Renaissance, Italy – tells of the great crisis in the life of Fernando d'Ávalos, general of Charles V and husband of Victoria Colonna

=== Lyrics ===
- 1867 Balladen
- 1870 Romanzen und Bilder (Romances and pictures)
- 1872 Huttens letzte Tage (Hutten's Last Days) – a short epic poem
- 1873 Engelberg
- 1882 Gedichte (Poems)

=== Legacy ===
It is as a master of narrative ballads, often on historical themes, that Meyer is mostly remembered. His fiction also typically focuses on key historical moments from the Middle Ages, the Reformation and Counter-Reformation.

Meyer's lyric verse is almost entirely the product of his later years. He frequently celebrated human handiwork, especially works of art. Rome and the monumental work of Michelangelo were among decisive experiences in his life.

== See also ==
- Family romance
