= Joseph van Severdonck =

Belgian artist

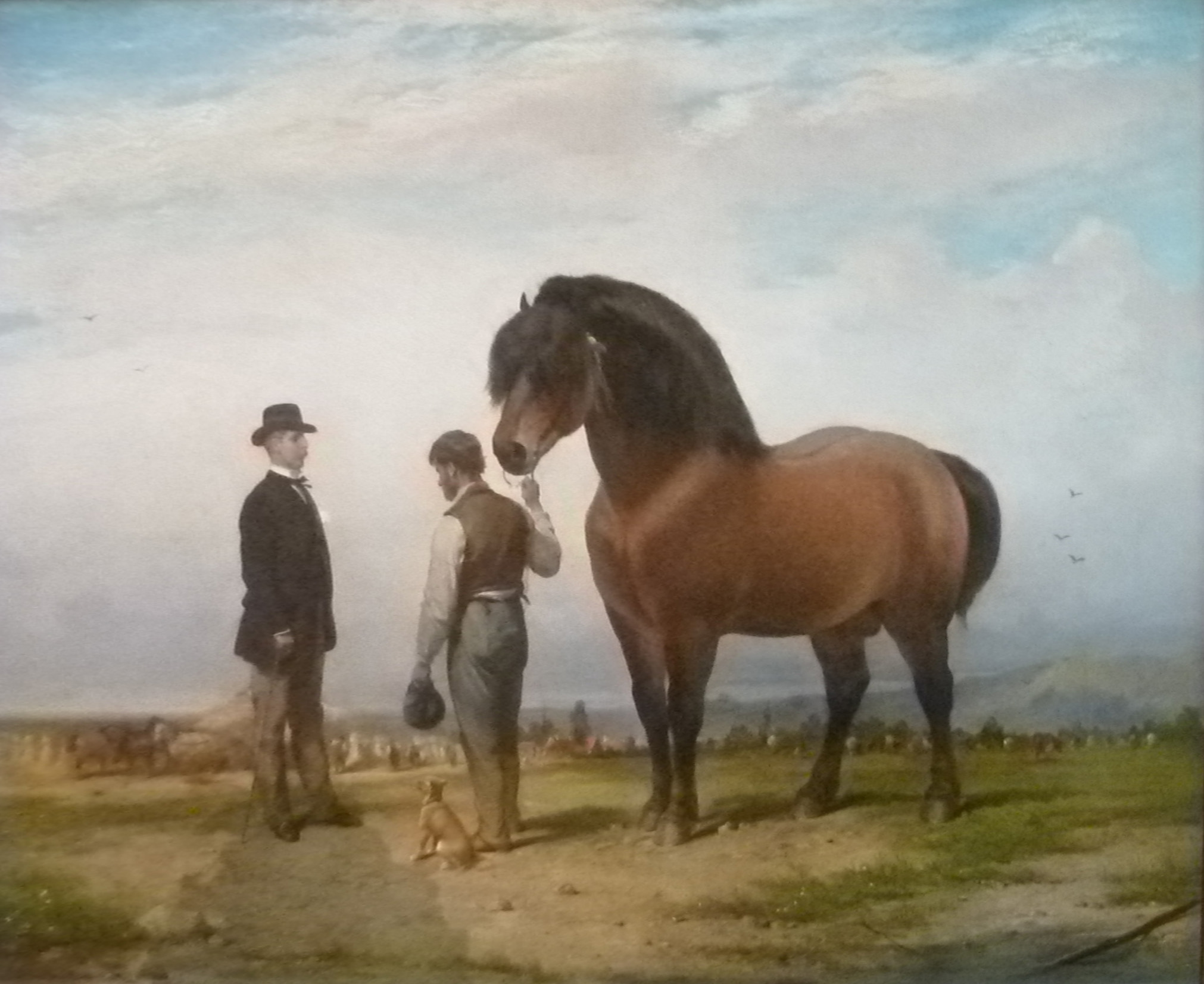
Animated harvest scene with horse and dog

Joseph van Severdonck (1819–1905) was a Belgian artist.

Severdonck specialized in historical and genre paintings and studied under Wappers. Critical reception of his works was mixed. Walter Shaw Sparrow, who studied under him and considered him a "noted character", wrote of him in his memoirs.

Work titles include:

- The Judgement of Solomon (ca. about 1850), oil on canvas
- 14 Stations, (Church of Notre Dame, Namur)
- Battle of Graveungen (1855);
- Defence of Tournay in 1581
- Visitation of Mary (1862)
- Ballot among the Gypsies
- Battle of Vucht, (Palace of Justice, Ghent )
- Cavalry Attack
