= Bertram Burleigh =

British actor (1890–1961)

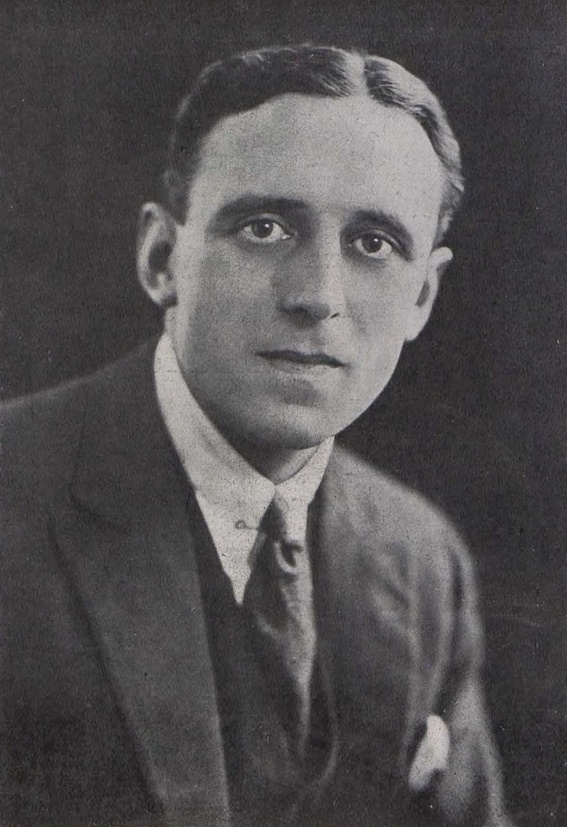
- Portrait of Bertram Burleigh, published in Le Courrier Cinématographique, June 1921.
- Born: Charles Bertram Burleigh; 15 February 1890; Birmingham, England
- Died: 24 April 1961 (aged 71); Goring-by-Sea, Sussex
- Occupations: Actor, cinema manager, hotel manager
- Years active: 1914-1927 (film)

Bertram Burleigh (1890 – 1961) was a British actor of the silent era. After early theatrical roles, Burleigh performed in leading roles in British films from 1914 to 1927. He retired from acting in the late 1920s, after which he managed cinemas and hotels in the West Midlands area.

== Biography ==
Charles Bertram Burleigh was born on 15 February 1890 in Birmingham, England, the son of Charles and Lucy Burleigh. His father was the proprietor of a steam laundry. He was educated at the Whitgift School in South Croydon, London.

Burleigh "was intended for the law" but commenced his acting career in a non-speaking role in a travelling theatre production. After taking on a speaking role, he was noticed by a London manager who hired him for a production in London. Burleigh later played lead roles in plays such as The Dawn of a Tomorrow, Priscilla Runs Away, The Second in Command and Magda. He was also a conjuror, "though conjuring is his hobby and an effective sideline". His older sister Maud was a dancer and singer at the Drury Lane Theatre in London.

On 20 September 1912 Burleigh married Dorothy Margaret Green, who was an actress and dancer in Brentford, Middlesex.

In about 1914, Burleigh was invited by the author of the play he was part of in the West End to appear in a film production. His first film was Wake Up! or, A Dream of Tomorrow, released in October 1914. The film was made by Union Jack Photo Plays Ltd., dealing thematically with a possible invasion of Britain. It was the beginning of a film acting career, during which he "was lost to the stage for many years".

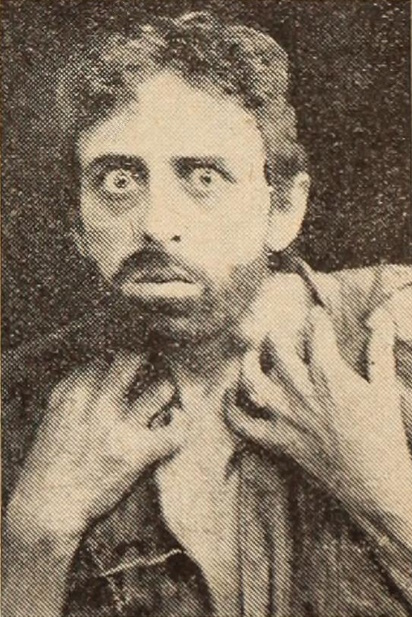
Bertram Burleigh in The Sands of Time (The Picture Show, 6 September 1919).

Burleigh appeared in British films in the period 1914 to 1923, as well as two short films in 1926 and a final film role in 1927. He worked for a number of early British film production companies including G. B. Samuelson Productions, London Film Productions, Harma Photoplays, Stoll Pictures and Master Films. Burleigh also worked for the American company Paramount Pictures in their first film made in England, as well as the French company La Société d'Editions Cinématographiques. In January 1916 Burleigh commented that he "considers acting in pictures a higher art than on the stage because the story one has to tell must be told without the aid of the voice".

In 1920 Burleigh played a lead role in The Great Day, the first film made by Paramount Pictures in England. The film was made at the newly-built Famous Players-Lasky Studio in Islington.

Burleigh arrived in New York in late September 1920. It was his first visit to America where he intended to visit various studios. Burleigh returned to England in December 1920 aboard the Saxonia.

During the 1915 post-Christmas pantomime season, Burleigh performed in Red Riding Hood at the Wimbledon Theatre, playing the role of Richard Coeur-de-Lion.

In late May 1921 Burleigh and the actress Amy Verity travelled to Paris to appear in lead roles in the film L'Amour de Mort (A Dead Man's Love) produced by La Société d'Editions Cinématographiques. Burleigh played the role of Hyde and Miss Verity played Débora.

In December 1922 Burleigh contributed his services to a fair at the Hotel Cecil in London to raise funds for hospitals. The actor was set up in a tent where he hypnotised people "for the small sum of a shilling". It was reported that he "made quite a lot of money for the hospitals by giving a number of performances daily", giving customers "the novel experience of going into a hypnotic sleep".

In about 1923 Burleigh took on a theatrical role in Partners Again at the Garrick Theatre in London's West End.

Burleigh and his wife Dorothy were divorced in 1924. Dorothy afterwards married twice more.

Burleigh retired from acting in the late 1920s. His final film role was in White Heat, made by Graham-Wilcox Productions and released in April 1927. In July 1928 Burleigh was appointed as the Midland Circuit manager for the Gaumont-British Corporation, with his headquarters at the Villa Gross Cinema in Handsworth, Birmingham. He worked as a manager for Wolverhampton Theatre Cinemas until 1935 and afterwards as a manager of hotels and inns in the Birmingham area.

In 1946 Burleigh married Mary Sabiston (née Reay), the former wife of Herbert M. Sabiston.

Burleigh owned the Cock Inn at Wishaw, near Sutton Coldfield, in Warwickshire. He sold the Cock Inn in about 1958.

Burleigh died on 24 April 1961 in Goring-by-Sea, near Worthing, Sussex, aged 71.

== Filmography ==
- Wake Up! or, A Dream of Tomorrow (October 1914) (Union Jack Photo Plays).
- John Halifax, Gentleman (June 1915) (G. B. Samuelson Productions).
- The Angels of Mons (September 1915) (G. B. Samuelson Productions).
- Infelice (September 1915), playing the character Cuthbert Lawrence (G. B. Samuelson Productions).
- The Dop Doctor (a.k.a. The Love Trail) (January 1915), playing the character Lord Beauvais (G. B. Samuelson Productions).
- Meg of the Slums (January 1916) (short film), playing the character Harry Newman (Henry Howse).
- Trapped by the London Sharks (June 1916), playing the character Inspector James Graham (Barker Films).
- I Believe (a.k.a. The Man Without a Soul) (July 1916) (London Film Productions, Sherman Pictures).
- A Mother's Influence (October 1916), playing the character Ives Pomeroy (short film) (London Film Productions).
- The Mother of Dartmoor (December 1917), playing the character Ives Pomeroy (London Film Productions).
- The Gates of Duty (a.k.a. Tower of Strength) (May 1919), playing the character David Shannon (Harma Photoplays).
- The Sands of Time (August 1919), playing the character Alan Rose (Harma Photoplays).
- Mrs. Thompson (April 1919), playing the character Dicky Marsden (G. B. Samuelson Productions).
- Garryowen (January 1920), playing the character Robert Dashwood (Welsh Pearson).
- The Black Spider (a.k.a. Foolish Monte Carlo) (1920), playing the character Archie Lowndes (British and Colonial Films).
- Burnt In (1920), playing the character Mark Heron (British Actors).
- The Great Day (1920), playing the character Frank Beresford (Paramount Pictures).
- How Kitchener Was Betrayed (1921), playing the character Lieutenant Mack (Screen Plays).
- All Roads Lead to Calvary (1921), playing the character Bob Phillips (Astra Films).
- L'Amour de Mort (a.k.a. La Fiancée du Disparu) (1921), playing the character of Hyde (La Société d'Editions Cinématographiques).
- Grand Guignol: The Curse of Westacott (1921) (Screen Plays, one-reel film).
- Tense Moments from Opera: Il Travatore (1922), playing the character Manrico (Master Films, one-reel film).
- Tense Moments from Opera: The Lily of Killarney (1922), playing the character Hardress Creegan (Master Films, one-reel film).
- Man and His Kingdom (1922), playing the character Eugene Rimarez (Stoll Pictures).
- Squibs Wins the Calcutta Sweep (1922), playing the character The Weasel (Ivy's husband) (George Pearson Productions).
- The Further Adventures of Sherlock Holmes: The Red Circle (1922), playing the character Gennaro Lucca (Stoll Pictures).
- Eminent British Authors: Open Country (1922), playing the character Jack Senhouse (Stoll Pictures).
- The Sporting Twelve: Won By Warr (1922), playing the character Eric Warr (Master Films, one-reel film).
- The Crimson Circle (September 1922) (Kinema Club).
- The Last Adventures of Sherlock Holmes: The Engineer's Thumb (1923) (Stoll Pictures, short film).
- Becket (1923), playing the character Lord Leicester (Stoll Pictures).
- Don Quixote (1923), playing the character Sanson Carrasco (Stoll Pictures).
- Clue of the Oak Leaf (1926) (short film) (FHC Productions).
- Screen Playlets: The Escape (1926), playing the character Richard Manton (short film).
- White Heat (April 1927), playing the character Phil Storer (Graham-Wilcox Productions).
