= H. C. Bailey =

English author (1878–1961)

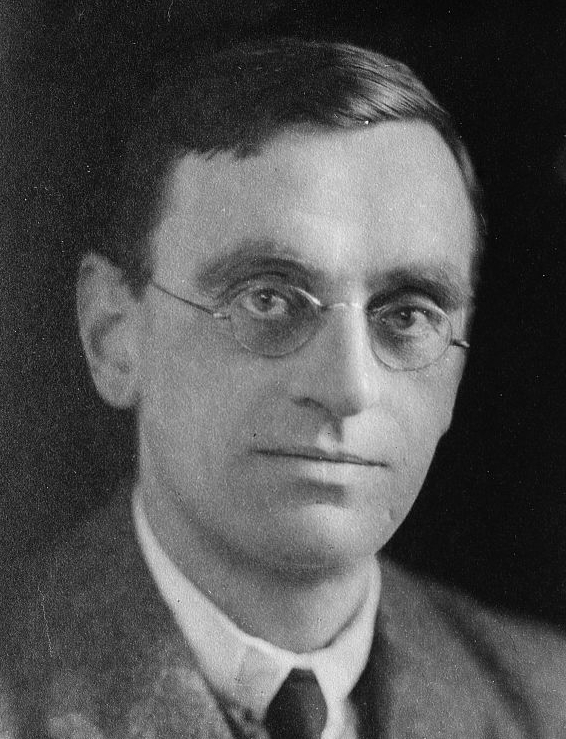
- H. C. Bailey in 1900
- Born: Henry Christopher Bailey; 1 February 1878; London, England
- Died: 24 March 1961 (aged 83); Llanfairfechan, Wales
- Occupations: Novelist; short story writer
- Spouses: Lydia Guest (m. 1908)
- Children: 2
- Writing career
- Genres: Murder mystery; detective story; crime fiction; thriller
- Notable works: Creation of characters Reggie Fortune and Joshua Clunk
- Literary movement: Golden Age of Detective Fiction

Henry Christopher Bailey (1 February 1878 – 24 March 1961) was an English author of detective fiction.

== Life ==
Bailey was born in London. He studied Classics at Oxford University, earning a B.A. in 1901. Bailey began working as a journalist for The Daily Telegraph, writing war journalism, drama reviews, and editorials for the newspaper.

In 1908, Bailey married Lydia Haden Janet Guest (d. 1971). They had two daughters, Betty Lydia Bennett (nee Bailey; d. 1972) and Mary Dorothy Bailey.

Bailey retired from writing in 1950, and spent the last years of his life living in North Wales. He died on 24 March 1961, aged 83, in Llanfairfechan. His estate was valued at £14991 7s. 7d., and his widow was the sole heir.

== Fiction ==
Bailey wrote mainly short stories featuring a medically qualified detective called Reggie Fortune (a surgeon, hence he is known as 'Mr Fortune'). Fortune's mannerisms and speech put him into the same class as Lord Peter Wimsey but the stories are much darker, and often involve murderous obsession, police corruption, financial skulduggery, child abuse and miscarriages of justice. Although Mr Fortune is seen at his best in short stories, he also appears in several novels.

A second series character, Joshua Clunk, is a sanctimonious lawyer who exposes corruption and blackmail in local politics, and who manages to profit from the crimes. He appears in eleven novels published between 1930 and 1950, including The Sullen Sky Mystery (1935), widely regarded as Bailey's magnum opus.

Bailey also wrote historical fiction. His first historical novel, My Lady of Orange (1901) revolves around William the Silent, and his involvement in the Dutch Revolt.

Bailey's works were published in a number of magazines, primarily The Windsor Magazine and Adventure and reprinted in Ellery Queen's Mystery Magazine.

== Works ==
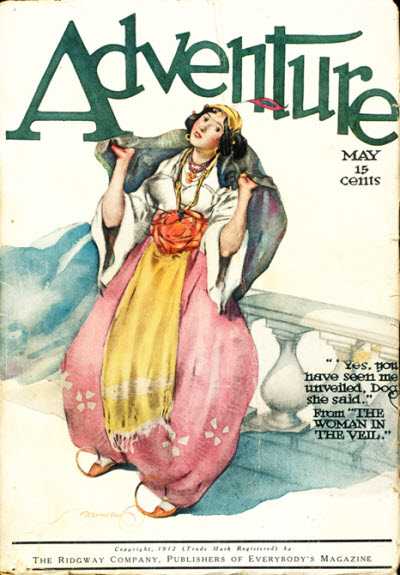
Bailey's "The Woman in the Veil" was the cover story in the May 1912 issue of Adventure

=== Romantic and historic fiction ===
- My Lady of Orange (1901). Serialised, Longman's Magazine, December 1900 to May 1901
- Karl of Erbach (1903). Serialised as Prince Karl, Longman's Magazine, July 1992 to March 1903
- The Master of Gray (1903)
- Rimingtons (1904)
- Beaujeu (1905). Serialised, Monthly Review, UNKNOWN MONTH to UNKNOWN MONTH 1905
- Under Castle Walls (1906), aka Springtime. Serialised as "Springtime", The Idler, April to November 1906
- Raoul, a Gentleman of Fortune (1907), aka A Gentleman of Fortune: Serialised, Pall Mall Magazine, May to December 1906
- The God of Clay (1908): Serialised, Pall Mall Magazine, January to December 1907
- Colonel Stow (1908)
- Storm and Treasure (1910)
- The Lonely Lady (1911)
- The Suburban (1912)
- The Sea Captain (1913) Serialized, The Grand Magazine, January to December 1912.; and in Adventure, September 1911 to January 1913
- The Gentleman Adventurer (1914)
- The Highwayman (1915)
- The Gamesters (1916)
- The Young Lovers (1917)
- The Pillar of Fire (1918)
- Barry Leroy (1919)
- His Serene Highness (1920)
- The Fool (1921); serialised, Everybody's Magazine, June to September 1921. Historical novel about Henry II of England
- The Plot (1922)
- The Rebel (1923)
- Knight at Arms (1924) Historical novel set in the time of Charles VIII of France
- The Golden Fleece (1925)
- The Merchant Prince (1926)
- Bonaventure (1927)
- Judy Bovenden (1928). Serialised, Daily Telegraph, 3 August 1928 to 13 September 1928
- The Roman Eagles (1929), juvenile
- Mr Cardonnel (1931)

=== Detective fiction ===
- Call Mr Fortune (1920), short stories collection

- "The Archduke's Tea" (Boston Tribune, 15 May 1921)
- "The Sleeping Companion" (Boston Tribune, 22 May 1921)
- "The Nice Girl" (Boston Tribune, 29 May 1921)
- "The Efficient Assassin" (Boston Tribune, 5 June 1921)
- "The Hottentot Venus" (Boston Tribune, 12 June 1921)
- "The Business Minister" (Boston Tribune, 19 and 26 June 1921)

- Mr Fortune's Practice (1923), short stories collection

- "The Ascot Tragedy" (People's Magazine, 1 May 1923)
- "The President of San Jacinto" (People's Magazine, 1 February 1923, as 'The President of San Isidro')
- "The Young Doctor"
- "The Magic Stone" (People's Magazine, 1 January 1923)
- "The Snowball Burglary" (People's Magazine, 15 January 1923)
- "The Leading Lady" (People's Magazine, 1 April 1923, as 'The Vanishing Lady')
- "The Unknown Murderer" (People's Magazine, 1 March 1923)

- Mr Fortune's Trials (1925), short stories collection

- "The Young God" (London Magazine, August 1924; Washington Star, 1 August 1926)
- "The Only Son" (London Magazine, November 1924; Flynn's, 7 March 1925)
- "The Furnished Cottage" (London Magazine, December 1924; Flynn's, 21 March 1925)
- "The Hermit Crab" (London Magazine, October 1924; Flynn's, 21 February 1925)
- "The Long Barrow" (London Magazine, January 1925; Washington Star, 19 September 1926)
- "The Profiteers" (London Magazine, September 1924; Washington Star, 3 October 1926)

- Mr Fortune, Please (1928), short stories collection

- "The Missing Husband" (Flynn's Weekly, 18 September 1926)
- "The Cat Burglar" (Flynn's Weekly, 6 November 1926)
- "The Lion Party" (Flynn's Weekly, 2 October 1926)
- "The Violet Farm" (Flynn's Weekly, 22 January 1927)
- "The Quiet Lady" (Flynn's Weekly, 16 October 1926)
- "The Little House" (Flynn's Weekly, 9 October 1926)

- Mr Fortune Speaking (1929), short stories collection

- "Zodiacs" (Flynn's Weekly Detective Fiction, 19 November 1927, as 'Zodiacs'; Windsor Magazine, May 1928)
- "The Cat's Milk" (Windsor Magazine, October 1928)
- "The Pink Macaw" (Flynn's Weekly Detective Fiction, 4 February 1928; Windsor Magazine, August 1928)
- "The Hazel Ice" (Flynn's Weekly Detective Fiction, 10 December 1927; Windsor Magazine, September 1928)
- "The Painted Pebbles" (Flynn's Weekly Detective Fiction, 26 November 1927; Windsor Magazine, June 1928)
- "The Woman in Wood" (Flynn's Weekly Detective Fiction, 17 March 1928)
- "The German Song" (Windsor Magazine, November 1928)
- "The Lion Fish" (Flynn's Weekly Detective Fiction, 12 November 1927; Windsor Magazine, April 1928)

- Garstons / The Garston Murder Case (1930; Clunk)
- Mr Fortune Explains (1930), short stories collection

- "The Picnic" (Windsor Magazine, May 1929)
- "The Little Milliner" (Windsor Magazine, June 1929)
- "The Wedding Ring" (Windsor Magazine, February 1930)
- "The Football Photograph" (The Delineator, 1 July 1929; (Windsor Magazine, September 1929)
- "The Rock Garden" (Windsor Magazine, January 1930; The Delineator, January 1930)
- "The Silver Cross" (Windsor Magazine, November 1929; The Delineator, February 1930)
- "The Bicycle Lamp" (Windsor Magazine, December 1929)
- "The Face in the Picture" (Windsor Magazine, July 1929)

- Case for Mr Fortune (1932), short stories collection

- "The Greek Play" (Winnipeg Tribune, 27 September 1930; Windsor Magazine, October 1931)
- "The Mountain Meadow" (Windsor Magazine, January 1932)
- "The Pair of Spectacles" (Windsor Magazine, September 1931)
- "A Bunch of Grapes" (Windsor Magazine, November 1931; The Delineator, November 1931)
- "The Sported Oak" (Windsor Magazine, April 1932)
- "The Oak Gall" (Windsor Magazine, May 1932)
- "The Little Dog" (Windsor Magazine, March 1932 as "The Small Dog")
- "The Walrus Ivory" (Windsor Magazine, February 1932; The Delineator, February 1932)

- The Red Castle / The Red Castle Mystery (1932; Clunk)
- The Man in the Cape (1933)
- Mr Fortune Wonders (1933), short stories collection

- "The Cigarette Case" (Windsor Magazine, May 1933; The Delineator, May 1933, as "The Mystery of the Missing Cigarettes")
- "The Yellow Diamonds" (Windsor Magazine, June 1933)
- "The Lilies of St. Gabriel's" (Windsor Magazine, August 1933)
- "The Gipsy Moth" (Windsor Magazine, October 1933; The Delineator, October 1933)
- "The Fairy Cycle" (Windsor Magazine, November 1933)
- "The Oleander Flowers" (Windsor Magazine, December 1933)
- "The Love Bird" (Windsor Magazine, September 1933)
- "The Old Bible" (Windsor Magazine, July 1933; The Delineator, July 1933)

- Shadow on the Wall (1934; Fortune, cameo by Clunk)
- Mr Fortune Objects (1935), short stories collection

- "The Broken Toad" (Windsor Magazine, October 1934)
- "The Angel's Eye" (Windsor Magazine, November 1934)
- "The Little Finger" (Windsor Magazine, December 1934)
- "The Three Bears" (Windsor Magazine, February 1935)
- "The Long Dinner" (Windsor Magazine, January 1935)
- "The Yellow Slugs" (Windsor Magazine, March 1935)

- The Sullen Sky Mystery (1935; Clunk)
- A Clue for Mr Fortune (1936), short stories collection

- "The Torn Stocking" (Windsor Magazine, March 1936)
- "The Swimming Pool" (Windsor Magazine, April 1936)
- "The Hole in the Parchment" (Windsor Magazine, May 1936)
- "The Holy Well" (Windsor Magazine, June 1936)
- "The Wistful Goddess" (Windsor Magazine, August 1936)
- "The Dead Leaves" (Windsor Magazine, July 1936)

- Black Land, White Land (1937; Fortune)
- Clunk's Claimant / The Twittering Bird Mystery (1937; Clunk, cameo by Fortune)
- This is Mr Fortune (1938), short stories collection

- "The Yellow Cloth" (Windsor Magazine, April 1938)
- "The Children's Home" (Windsor Magazine, August 1938)
- "The Lizard's Tail" (Windsor Magazine, May 1938)
- "The Cowslip Ball" (Windsor Magazine, June 1938)
- "The Burnt Tout" (Windsor Magazine, July 1938)
- "The Key of the Door" (Windsor Magazine, September 1938)

- The Great Game (1939; Fortune, cameo by Clunk)
- The Veron Mystery / Mr Clunk's Text (1939; Clunk, cameo by Fortune)
- Mr Fortune Here (1940), short stories collection

- "The Bottle Party" (Strand Magazine, October 1939)
- "The Primrose Petals" (Strand Magazine, April 1940)
- "The Spider's Web" (Strand Magazine, November 1939)
- "The Fight for the Crown"
- "The Point of the Knife" (Strand Magazine, March 1940)
- "The Gilded Girls"
- "The Brown Paper"
- "The Blue Paint" (Strand Magazine, February 1940)
- "The Bird in the Cellar"

- The Bishop's Crime (1940; Fortune)
- The Little Captain / Orphan Ann (1941; Clunk)
- No Murder / The Apprehensive Dog (1942; Fortune)
- Dead Man's Shoes / Nobody's Vineyard (1942; Clunk)
- Mr Fortune Finds a Pig (1943; Fortune)
- Slippery Ann / The Queen of Spades (1944; Clunk)
- Dead Man's Effects / The Cat's Whisker (1945; Fortune)
- The Wrong Man (1946; Clunk)
- The Life Sentence (1946; Fortune)
- Honour Among Thieves (1947; Clunk)
- Saving a Rope / Save a Rope (1948; Fortune)
- Shrouded Death (1950; Clunk)

=== Other books ===
- Forty Years After (1914) with WL Courtney

=== Other Mr Fortune short stories ===
See Radio plays and talks also

- TITLE UNKNOWN. Windsor Magazine, December 1931
- The Thistle Down. The Queen's Book of the Red Cross (1939). Published in Bodies from the Library 5, ed. Tony Medawar (HarperCollins, 2021).

=== Uncollected non-series short stories ===
- Dolly and Dick. Longman's Magazine, October 1901
- The Knight of Mayford. Windsor Magazine, January 1902
- The King's Way. Windsor Magazine, March 1903
- Sir Albert's Fall. Windsor Magazine, July 1902
- Dominique. Macmillan's Magazine, November 1902
- The King's Way. Windsor Magazine, December 1902
- The Nun of Newstead. Windsor Magazine, April 1903
- The Torpedo Lieutenant. The Realm, March 1904
- The Lone Hand. Windsor Magazine, May 1904
- The Deplorable Princess. The Realm, July 1904
- The Devil of Marston. Windsor Magazine, July 1904
- The Anachronism. Pall Mall Magazine, October 1904
- A Plot in the Duchy. Pall Mall Magazine, January 1905
- Ercole. Illustrated London News, 1 July 1905
- Sir Bertram's Tryst. Windsor Magazine, August 1905
- The Men in Buckram. Windsor Magazine, September 1905
- Mrs Cromwell's Heart. Windsor Magazine, September 1905
- The Golden Whistle. The Century, June 1906
- The Love of Money. Windsor Magazine, 1907
- Politics and the Grocer. Windsor Magazine, August 1907
- How He Won His Throne. Pall Mall Magazine, November 1907
- My Lady's Lord. Pall Mall Magazine, January 1908
- TITLE UNKNOWN. Windsor Magazine, February 1908
- Double Sculls. The Strand Magazine, August 1908
- Hungry Hours. Pall Mall Magazine, December 1908
- The Lonely Queen. Pall Mall Magazine, July to December 1910
- The Fairy Prince. Pall Mall Magazine, July 1911
- Charles Is Engaged. Daily Telegraph, 3 August 1912
- The Woman Who Cried. Daily Telegraph, 5 August 1912
- The Hopkins Romance. Pall Mall Magazine, August 1913
- The Jolly Roger. Adelaide Advertiser, 21 March 1914. Earlier publication not yet traced
- The Bagman, July 1918
- The Young Folks. The Quiver, July 1919
- Suburban Adventure. Daily Telegraph & Courier, 20 December 1919
- The Child, July 1920
- The Old Bureau, May 1921
- The Country Cottage. Grand Magazine, August 1921
- The Tortoise Sonata. Gaiety, December 1921
- The Golden Fleece. The Scotsman, 18 December 1926
- Victoria Pumphrey. Holly Leaves (Illustrated Sporting and Dramatic News), December 1939 Published in Bodies from the Library 1, ed. Tony Medawar (HarperCollins, 2021).

=== Poetry ===
- Spring in Arden. Programme for the matinee performance at the Theatre Royal, Drury Lane, in aid of the Shakespeare Memorial Theatre Fund at Stratford on Avon

=== Theatre plays ===
- Beaujeu by H C Bailey and David Kimball. English Play Society, 23 and 24 May 1909. Adapted from the novel by H C Bailey
- The White Hawk by H C Bailey and David Kimball. English Play Society, 3 June 1909

=== Radio plays and talks ===
- Meet Mr Fortune. Meet the Detective. BBC Empire Service. Date unknown (Mr Fortune profile, narrated by H. C. Bailey).
- The Only Husband. Plays by Members of the Detection Club, No. 8. BBC National Programme, 14 and 21 June 1941 (Mr Fortune radio play). Published in Bodies from the Library 4, ed. Tony Medawar (HarperCollins, 2021).

=== Uncollected non-fiction and journalism ===
- The Pageant of England: I The Coming of Caesar. Pall Mall Magazine, May 1908
- The Pageant of England: II Alfred the King. Pall Mall Magazine, June 1908
- The Pageant of England: III William the Norman. Pall Mall Magazine, July 1908
- The Pageant of England: IV King John Comes to Heel. Pall Mall Magazine, August 1908
- The Pageant of England: V The Merry King. Pall Mall Magazine, September 1908
- The Pageant of England: VI The Angel of Revolution. Pall Mall Magazine, October 1908
- The Pageant of England: VII TITLE UNKNOWN. Pall Mall Magazine, November 1908
- Good Form. Daily Telegraph, 30 November 1911
- The Stage and the Study. Daily Telegraph, 22 April 1916
- The Air Force: I - The Young Idea. Daily Telegraph, 26 September 1918
- The Air Force: II - The Wings. Daily Telegraph, 27 September 1918
- The Air Force: III - The Day's Work. Daily Telegraph, 2 October 1918
- The Great Advance: From Amiens to Le Cateau. Daily Telegraph, 26 October 1918
- Out at Last. Daily Telegraph, 22 November 1918
- German Fleet in the Firth of Forth. Daily Telegraph, 23 November 1918
- American Sea Power. Daily Telegraph, 16 December 1918
- Our Armies in Germany I. Daily Telegraph, 8 January 1919
- Our Armies in Germany II. Daily Telegraph, 9 January 1919
- Guards' Colours. Daily Telegraph, 11 January 1919
- Soldiers' Verdict on Cologne. Daily Telegraph, 11 January 1919
- Shock to Cologne. Daily Telegraph, 13 January 1919
- Rhine Provinces and United Germany. Daily Telegraph, 14 January 1919
- Luxembourg. Daily Telegraph, 16 January 1919
- On the Trail of Revolutions. Daily Telegraph, 17 January 1919
- Prince of Wales in Cologne. Daily Telegraph, 18 January 1919
- British Pantomime in Cologne Theatre. Daily Telegraph, 20 January 1919
- Campaign of 1918. Daily Telegraph, 20 January 1919
- Castle of Burg. Daily Telegraph, 22 January 1919
- Election Day in Cologne. Daily Telegraph, 22 January 1919
- German Elections. Daily Telegraph, 23 January 1919
- A Visit to Bonn. Daily Telegraph, 24 January 1919
- Germany's Problems. Daily Telegraph, 27 January 1919
- British Troops in Brussels. Daily Telegraph, 28 January 1919
- Jovial Belgians and Whining Germans. Daily Telegraph, 28 January 1919
- War's Effect in Lille and Douai. Daily Telegraph, 29 January 1919
- Our Men in Flanders. Daily Telegraph, 30 January 1919
- Scenes in Lille. Daily Telegraph, 30 January 1919
- The Last of the Ballets. Daily Telegraph, 14 March 1919
- Easter in Arden. Daily Telegraph, 24 April 1919
- Shakespeare Festival. Daily Telegraph, 25 April 1919
- War and the Theatre. Daily Telegraph, 16 May 1919
- Stage Heroes. Daily Telegraph, 5 June 1919
- Joy in the Theatre. Daily Telegraph, 26 June 1919
- Novels on the Stage. Daily Telegraph, 10 July 1919
- New York to Norfolk. Daily Telegraph, 14 July 1919
- The Naval Pageant. Daily Telegraph, 18 July 1919
- The Day Before. Daily Telegraph, 19 July 1919
- London's Tribute to Our War Heroes. Daily Telegraph, 21 July 1919
- Play and Pageant. Daily Telegraph, 24 July 1919
- Death of Mr Andrew Carnegie. Daily Telegraph, 12 August 1919
- Shakespeare Repertory I . Daily Telegraph, 27 August 1919
- Shakespeare Repertory II. Daily Telegraph, 28 August 1919
- Women Dramatists. Daily Telegraph, 28 August 1919
- The First Hamlet. Daily Telegraph, 24 September 1919
- The Coming of Children. Daily Telegraph, 13 December 1919
- Christmas Time. Daily Telegraph, 20 December 1919
- Leap Year. Daily Telegraph, 27 December 1919
- Julius Caesar. Daily Telegraph, 8 January 1920
- The Future. Daily Telegraph, 10 January 1920
- The Other Dramatists. Daily Telegraph, 22 January 1920
- Clothes and the Woman. Daily Telegraph, 31 January 1920
- Second Thoughts. Daily Telegraph, 7 February 1920
- Use of the Novel. Daily Telegraph, 13 March 1920
- King and People at the Cenotaph. Daily Telegraph, 12 November 1920
- Armistice Day. Daily Telegraph, 17 November 1920
- The Story of Landru's Trial. Daily Telegraph, 2 December 1921
- Phenomena of the Seance I. Daily Telegraph, 30 January 1922. Parts II and II were by other writers
- Pageant of Pomp in Westminster Abbey. Daily Telegraph, 1 March 1922
- Old Clowns and New. Daily Telegraph, 9 November 1922
- A Fantasy of Finance. Daily Telegraph, 7 December 1922
- The Ilford Murder. Daily Telegraph, 14 December 1922
- A New Holiday. Daily Telegraph, 30 June 1923
- Wilkie Collins. Daily Telegraph, 8 January 1924
- The Wheel of Fashion. Daily Telegraph, 2 December 1927
- Incompatible Minds. Daily Telegraph, 11 September 1928
- Continents of Romance. Daily Telegraph, 6 May 1929
- Epsom's Endless Magic. Daily Telegraph, 9 June 1929
- The Elegance of Ascot. Daily Telegraph, 17 June 1929
- Abbey Service for Earl of Balfour. Daily Telegraph, 24 March 1930
- Parents and Children. Daily Telegraph, 7 July 1930
- R101 Memorial Service in St Pauls. Daily Telegraph, 11 October 1930
- Homilies upon Drink. Daily Telegraph, 8 November 1930
- A Novelty in Duelling. Daily Telegraph, 15 November 1930
- Smokers Old and New. Daily Telegraph, 22 November 1930
- Apologists for Age. Daily Telegraph, 29 November 1930
- Drinking as a Fine Art. Daily Telegraph, 3 December 1930
- Two Judges on Perjury. Daily Telegraph, 6 December 1930
- Truth in the Crowd. Daily Telegraph, 13 December 1930
- Penalty of Death: Gross Distortions in the Futile Report of the Sentimentalists. Daily Telegraph, 17 December 1930
- The Christmas Spirit. Daily Telegraph, 20 December 1930
- New Year's Revels. Daily Telegraph, 27 December 1930
- Optimism or Despondency. Daily Telegraph, 3 January 1931
- Coincidence and Destiny. Daily Telegraph, 10 January 1931
- Men Destined to Crime. Daily Telegraph, 13 January 1931
- Art of Gormandise. Daily Telegraph, 17 January 1931
- On Living for Ever. Daily Telegraph, 24 January 1931
- Marriage down the Ages. Daily Telegraph, 31 January 1931
- Trouble with Our Names. Daily Telegraph, 7 February 1931
- Companion of Witches. Daily Telegraph, 12 February 1931
- Men's Stories for Women. Daily Telegraph, 14 February 1931
- Holmes and His 'Dear Watson'. Daily Telegraph, 21 February 1931
- The Slavery of Tobacco. Daily Telegraph, 28 February 1931
- A Dream of the 'Fifties. Daily Telegraph, 7 March 1931
- The English Character. Daily Telegraph, 14 March 1931
- Morals and the Censor. Daily Telegraph, 21 March 1931
- The Mortality of Literary Fame. Daily Telegraph, 28 March 1931
- Diplomacy as Practised down the Ages. Daily Telegraph, 4 April 1931
- Portraits in Novels. Daily Telegraph, 11 April 1931
- Food and Feasting through the Ages. Daily Telegraph, 18 April 1931
- The Danger of Leisure. Daily Telegraph, 25 April 1931
- New Electric Age. Daily Telegraph, 2 May 1931
- Behind Our Dreams. Daily Telegraph, 9 May 1931
- Value of the 'Varsities. Daily Telegraph, 16 May 1931
- Lovely Womanhood through the Ages. Daily Telegraph, 23 May 1931
- Saint Joan of Arc. Daily Telegraph, 26 May 1931
- Are We English Human?. Daily Telegraph, 30 May 1931
- Looking Far Ahead. Daily Telegraph, 6 June 1931
- Going Down: The Choice of Careers. Daily Telegraph, 13 June 1931
- The Londoner's Spirit. Daily Telegraph, 20 June 1931
- The Victorian Father. Daily Telegraph, 27 June 1931
- The Art of Eating. Daily Telegraph, 4 July 1931
- Our Conversation. Daily Telegraph, 11 July 1931
- Love and Science. Daily Telegraph, 18 July 1931
- Good Haters. Daily Telegraph, 25 July 1931
- Our Crowded Holidays. Daily Telegraph, 1 August 1931
- Happy, though Modern. Daily Telegraph, 12 September 1931
- On Choice of Wines. Daily Telegraph, 19 September 1931
- Return of the Periwig. Daily Telegraph, 26 September 1931
- Ourselves in Duplicate. Daily Telegraph, 3 October 1931
- Mystery Man of Science. Daily Telegraph, 10 October 1931
- Liberties of the Pulpit. Daily Telegraph, 17 October 1931
- The Decline of Lunch. Daily Telegraph, 24 October 1931
- Legends of the Beard. Daily Telegraph, 31 October 1931
- Food in Books. Daily Telegraph, 7 November 1931
- More Marriage Theories. Daily Telegraph, 14 November 1931
- Gentle Shocking of Our Forefathers. Daily Telegraph, 21 November 1931
- The Castaway. Daily Telegraph, 23 November 1931
- Cowper's Misery. Daily Telegraph, 26 November 1931
- Marriage a la Mode. Daily Telegraph, 28 November 1931
- The Wassail Bowl. Daily Telegraph, 5 December 1931
- Christmas Pleasures. Daily Telegraph, 12 December 1931
- Children as Sightseers. Daily Telegraph, 19 December 1931
- New Year Resolutions. Daily Telegraph, 2 January 1932
- Exhibition Humbug. Daily Telegraph, 9 January 1932
- Short Men and Tall Men. Daily Telegraph, 16 January 1932
- Degradation of Wives. Daily Telegraph, 23 January 1932
- Lewis Carroll and His Immortal Alice. Daily Telegraph, 27 January 1932
- Prizes Won at School. Daily Telegraph, 6 February 1932
- Family Inquisition Myths. Daily Telegraph, 20 February 1932
- Daily Telegraph Literary Prize No 6 Result. Daily Telegraph, 23 February 1932
- Leap Day Tradition. Daily Telegraph, 27 February 1932
- That Cockney Conceit. Daily Telegraph, 5 March 1932
- That House of Our Dreams. Daily Telegraph, 12 March 1932
- Coaxing back a British Appetite. Daily Telegraph, 19 March 1932
- Thieves' Slang in fact and Fiction. Daily Telegraph, 26 March 1932
- Is Youth Overdoing the Cult of Sport. Daily Telegraph, 2 April 1932
- The Luck of the Sexes. Daily Telegraph, 9 April 1932
- Cigarette Smoking. Daily Telegraph, 16 April 1932
- State-Nursed Britain. Daily Telegraph, 7 May 1932
- When Mischief Comes to Children. Daily Telegraph, 16 May 1932
- The Beauty of Britain. Daily Telegraph, 26 May 1932
- Last Few Survivals of Snobbery. Daily Telegraph, 28 May 1932
- Scenes That Linger in the Memory. Daily Telegraph, 30 May 1932
- Who Shall Arrange Our Private Budgets?. Daily Telegraph, 4 June 1932
- Speeding up Travelling. Daily Telegraph, 11 June 1932
- Holidays in August. Daily Telegraph, 18 June 1932
- On Hiking and Hikers. Daily Telegraph, 21 June 1932
- When the Sparkle Went into Champagne. Daily Telegraph, 25 June 1932
- Sorcery Still Lives. Daily Telegraph, 2 July 1932
- Team Games for Girls. Daily Telegraph, 9 July 1932
- Modern Family Life Relies on Freedom. Daily Telegraph, 16 July 1932
- The Evil of Our School Examinations. Daily Telegraph, 23 July 1932
- Our Holiday Haunts. Daily Telegraph, 2 August 1932
- Is Pure English Doomed?. Daily Telegraph, 6 August 1932. Reprinted as The Future of English. New York Times, 28 August 1932
- The School Certificate. Daily Telegraph, 15 October 1932
- Why Britain is Paying £19,750,000 to US today. Daily Telegraph, 15 December 1932
- Professor Saintsbury, the Critic. Daily Telegraph, 30 January 1933
- Is This Age Soft?. Daily Telegraph, 14 September 1933
- Star Spangled Sportsman. Daily Telegraph, 18 September 1933
- A City's Revolution in Poor Law Relief. Daily Telegraph, 22 May 1934
- The Germans' Tribal God: Reverence for Hindenburg as Exemplar of Their Race and Nation. Daily Telegraph, 3 August 1934
- Parliaments of the Past and the India Problem. Daily Telegraph, 19 October 1934
- Remodelling the French Republic. Daily Telegraph, 29 October 1934
- Saarlanders at the Poll. Daily Telegraph, 14 January 1935
- How the Nation's Unity Was Eclipsed at St Paul's. Daily Telegraph, 7 May 1935
- When Mr Haig Thought Mr Lloyd George 'Ungentlemanly'. Daily Telegraph, 3 October 1935
- Thirty Years the Guide of British Socialism. (London) Daily Telegraph, 21 October 1935
- Four Years of Parliament. Daily Telegraph, 26 October 1935
- Change in London's Sunday. Daily Telegraph, 1 November 1935
- Election Time in Fiction. Daily Telegraph, 16 November 1935
- Mark Twain: America's Best Loved Humorist. Daily Telegraph, 30 November 1935
- Kipling, Imperial Poet the World Acclaimed. Daily Telegraph, 18 January 1936
- Power of the Crown Today. Daily Telegraph, 23 January 1936
- Mr Lloyd George's War-Strained Mood. Daily Telegraph, 24 September 1936
- Sir James Barrie as Genius, Man and Friend. Daily Telegraph, 21 June 1937
- Can Britain Save Its Countryside. Daily Telegraph, 20 August 1938
- Hitler's Grim Six-Year Record in Technique and Perfidy. Daily Telegraph, 4 September 1939. Reprinted as Hitler's Record of Perfidy. The Times of India, 21 September 1939
- Britain Has Always Fought Europe's Ambitious Despots. Daily Telegraph, 9 September 1939
- These Men Set Reason at Defiance to Launch a War. Daily Telegraph, 23 September 1939
- No Scheming by Germany Will Defeat the Allied Blockade. Daily Telegraph, 10 October 1939
- Germany is the Next Great Objective. Daily Telegraph, 18 October 1939
- Resources of Empire will be Massed to Our Final Victory. Daily Telegraph, 26 October 1939
- Absent Businesses are Slowing down the Economic Machine. Daily Telegraph, 9 November 1939
- Foch Was Unrelenting Till Germany's Envoys Sued for Peace. Daily Telegraph, 11 November 1939
- Should We Have a Super-Minister of Economics?. Daily Telegraph, 7 February 1940
- Strategy of Britain's New Overseas Trade Drive. Daily Telegraph, 6 March 1940
- Peril of Isolation Is Realised by Europe's Neutrals Now. Daily Telegraph, 15 March 1940
- Hitler Has Forfeited High Stakes in Norway Campaign. Daily Telegraph, 6 May 1940
- Sea Power Will Always Decide a Mediterannean War. Daily Telegraph, 5 June 1940
- Desert and Sea have Always Saved Egypt from Conquest. Daily Telegraph, 19 August 1940
- Mr Churchill at 66: 'Vehement, High and Daring'. Daily Telegraph, 30 November 1940
- Soldier, Scout and Law Giver to the World's Youth. Daily Telegraph, 9 January 1941
- The Kaiser Sacrificed Both People and Throne. Daily Telegraph, 5 June 1941
- Middle of the Nation [TO BE CHECKED]. Daily Telegraph, 11 July 1941
- Prince's Life of Service for Crown and Commonwealth. Daily Telegraph, 17 January 1942
- 1918: The Germans Must See 1944 Ominous Portents. Daily Telegraph, 22 July 1944
- In Antwerp, Germany Has Lost a Valuable Stronghold. Daily Telegraph, 6 September 1944
- Germany Struck down through an Earlier Siegfried Line. Daily Telegraph, 8 September 1944
- Six Years of Ordeal to Win the World's Freedom. Daily Telegraph, 8 May 1945
- The Left Was Never Right on Pre-War Defence Policy. Daily Telegraph, 1 June 1945
- Socialist Party's Black Record between the Wars. Daily Telegraph, 8 June 1945
- Releasing the Mighty Forces Locked up in the Atom. Daily Telegraph, 8 August 1945. Reprinted: Union Jack (Central Italy edition), 16 August 1945, as The Atom Is Indeed Mighty
- Conservatives in Council. Daily Telegraph, 28 November 1945
- The King's Fiftieth Birthday. Daily Telegraph, 14 December 1945
- Britain's Most Wonderful Year. Daily Telegraph, 31 December 1945
- Greatest Seaborne Invasion in History. Daily Telegraph, 11 January 1946

=== Letters to the press ===
- Tram Memories. (London) Daily Telegraph, 30 June 1952
