= Ada Ferrar =

British actress (1864–1951)

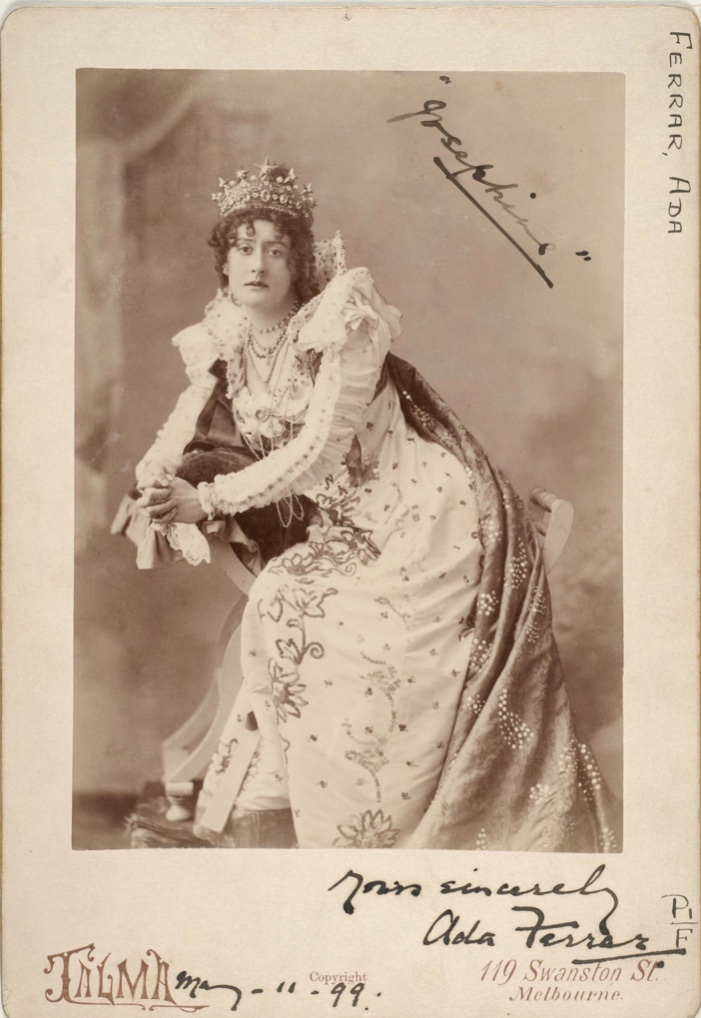
Ada Ferrar as Josephine in A Royal Divorce (1899)

Ada Ferrar (1 June 1864 – 8 January 1951) was a British actress of the late Victorian and Edwardian eras.

== Early life ==
Born in St Pancras in London in 1864 as Ada Janet Bishop to Mary S. Bishop (1836-) and Charles R. Bishop (1814-), the Managing Clerk to a firm of solicitors, she was one of three actress sisters which included Beatrice Ferrar (1875-1958) and Jessie Ferrar (a.k.a. Marion Bishop (1879-1950).

At first her desire to go on the stage met with some parental resistance, but eventually following her success her younger sisters were to follow her in her chosen career. Her first appearance was singing in the chorus in Claudian (1883) following which she gained theatrical experience touring with the Vaughan-Conway Company. For F. R. Benson's 1888 season at the Shakespeare Memorial Theatre at Stratford-upon-Avon she played Gertrude in Hamlet (1888), Lady Touchwood in The Belle's Stratagem, Margherita in Andrea, Hermia/Helena in A Midsummer Night's Dream and Lady Capulet in Romeo and Juliet.

== Theatrical career 1890-96 ==
In 1890 Ferrar appeared as Geraldine in The Green Bushes, or, A Hundred Years Ago and Creusa in The Bride of Love (in a production which marked the London début of her sister Beatrice Ferrar) both at the Adelphi Theatre in London (1890), and in 1891 was Ethel Kingston in The English Rose at the Adelphi Theatre. In April 1891 she married Walter Shaw Sparrow, then a Welsh actor but who went on to become a writer on art and architecture. The officers and workmen of the Ffrwd Works, her father-in-law's colliery, presented the couple with a "very chaste silvered tea and coffee service" with their best wishes. During the 1890s and into the 20th century she continued to feature prominently on the cast of many theatrical productions. Very soon after their marriage the magazine Theatre commended her performance as Alida in The Streets of London by Dion Boucicault at the Royal Adelphi Theatre in London (1891). She also played Violet Lovelace in They Were Married at the Strand Theatre (1892).

For F. R. Benson's 1892-93 season at the Shakespeare Memorial Theatre at Stratford-upon-Avon she played Olivia in Twelfth Night, Mrs Page in The Merry Wives of Windsor, Jessica in The Merchant of Venice, Lady Capulet in Romeo and Juliet, Bianca in The Taming of the Shrew, Timandra in Timon of Athens, Olivia in Twelfth Night, Calpurnia in Julius Caesar and Helena in A Midsummer Night's Dream. Ferrar played Orlando in an all-female production of As You Like It (1894). She was Ancaria in Wilson Barrett's The Sign of the Cross at the Lyric Theatre (1896–97) in which her performance was particularly well received.

== Australia tour 1896-99 ==
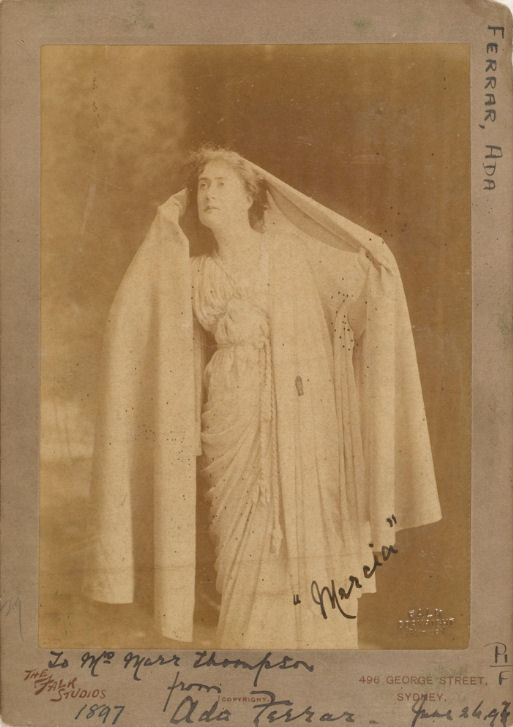
As Mercia in The Sign of the Cross in Sydney (1897)

From 1896 to 1899 she was touring New Zealand and Australia with a group of actors for George Musgrove and J. C. Williamson on an extended overseas tour, returning to England in September 1899. During the tour she took part in many productions including playing Josephine in A Royal Divorce, Princess Flavia in The Prisoner of Zenda and Mercia in The Sign of the Cross alongside Julius Knight.

== Later career 1899-1926 ==
On her return to Great Britain she rejoined the Company of F. R. Benson to play Hermia in his production of A Midsummer Night's Dream at the Globe Theatre and Gertude in Hamlet at the Lyceum Theatre (1900), while in November 1900 she opened as the Duchess of Strood in The Gay Lord Quex opposite John Hare at the Criterion Theatre in New York. In May 1902 Ferrar played Mrs. Llewellyn in The Finding of Nancy at the St. James's Theatre opposite Herbert Beerbohm Tree and Mabel Beardsley. She was Mrs. Dudley in Secret and Confidential at the Comedy Theatre (1902), and for Benson's 1903 season at the Shakespeare Memorial Theatre at Stratford-upon-Avon she played Helena in A Midsummer Night's Dream, Mistress Page in The Merry Wives of Windsor; she was 'a winsome and dignified' Hermione in The Winter's Tale; Gertrude in Hamlet, Katharine in The Taming of the Shrew in addition to Olivia in Twelfth Night, Nerissa in The Merchant of Venice, Constance Neville in She Stoops to Conquer and Lady Sneerwell in The School for Scandal.

In 1903 she was touring in The Marriage of Kitty opposite Marie Tempest including at the Prince's Theatre in Bristol. Ferrar also toured as Ben Greet's leading lady, playing Viola in Twelfth Night, Peg Woffington in Masks and Faces, Dora in Diplomacy and Rosamund in Sowing the Wind. She toured with Otho Stuart, with whom she had previously acted with Benson, and for whom she was Fédora, Dulcie in The Masqueraders and Mrs. Horton in Dr. Bill. She played the ambitious Bazilide in Stuart's tour of For the Crown.

She played Geraldine in The Green Bushes at the Adelphi Theatre and was in The English Rose. She was Athena opposite Gertrude Kingston as Helen in The Trojan Women at the Royal Court Theatre (1905); touring as the Duchess of Strood in The Gay Lord Quex opposite John Hare (1907–08); before playing Goneril in King Lear at the Haymarket Theatre (1909). She again played Goneril opposite Norman McKinnel in King Lear at His Majesty's Theatre (1910).

Ferrar was in Pinero's Preserving Mr. Panmure opposite Lilian Braithwaite and Arthur Playfair (1910– 1911) at the Comedy Theatre and was Donna Lucia d'Alvadorez in Charley's Aunt at the Prince of Wales's Theatre (1913–14) and Hippolyta in A Midsummer Night's Dream at The Old Vic (1914–15). In 1917 she was touring the provinces as Donna Lucia d'Alvadorez in Charley's Aunt for the Brandon Thomas Company in a cast that included a young Leslie Howard as Jack Chesney. Critics wrote of her performance, 'nothing could be more satisfactory than Miss Ada Ferrar in her role of "Donna Lucia". Full of graceful naturalness...' and 'Miss Ada Ferrar makes Donna Lucia d'Alvadorez an exceedingly delightful and pleasing personality.' Having somewhat cornered the market in the role, she was back again as Donna Lucia d'Alvadorez in Charley's Aunt at the Prince of Wales's Theatre (1920–21) before she acted as Mrs. Gilfillian in Pinero's Sweet Lavender opposite Lilian Braithwaite at the Ambassadors Theatre (1922–23). In 1926 she played Miss Trafalgar Gower in Trelawny of the 'Wells' at the Globe Theatre.

In the 1939 Register for England and Wales she is listed as 'Housewife'. After her husband's death in 1940 she was left just £287 6s in his will and was awarded a £100 Civil list pension under the Civil List Act 1837 for the "writings of her husband, the late Walter Shaw Sparrow, on art and architecture".

She died aged 86 at the Tuquor House Nursing Home in Kew in Surrey in January 1951. Her estate was valued at £920 2s 11d.
