= Constance Benson =

British actress (1864–1946)

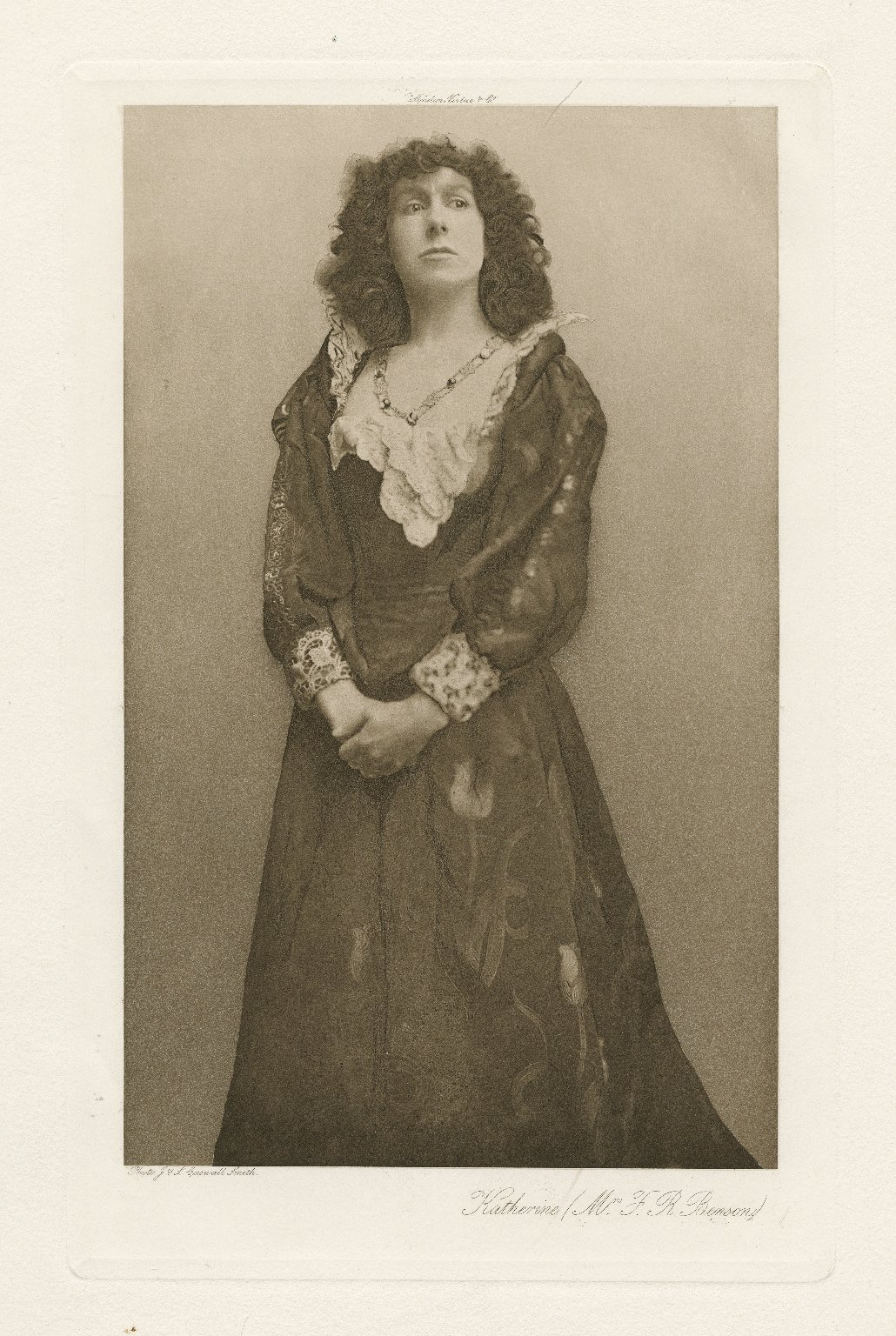
- A photograph of Constance Benson as Katherine from a 1901 performance of The Taming of the Shrew
- Born: Gertrude Constance Cockburn Samwell; 26 February 1864; British India
- Died: 19 January 1946 (aged 81); London
- Other name: Constance Featherstonhaugh
- Spouse: Frank Benson (m. 1886; died 1939)
- Children: 2

Gertrude Constance Cockburn Benson (née Samwell; 26 February 1864 – 19 January 1946) was a British stage and film actress. Before her marriage to Frank Benson, she was known by the stage name Constance Featherstonhaugh.

== Biography ==
Born in British India into a military family, and christened Gertrude Constance Cockburn Samwell, she took to the stage under the name of Featherstonhaugh, which was the middle name of her father, Morshead Featherstonhaugh Samwell. She married the actor Frank Benson on 24 July 1886, and they had two children, Eric William (1887–1916), killed at the battle of the Somme, and Brynhild Lucy (1888–1974).

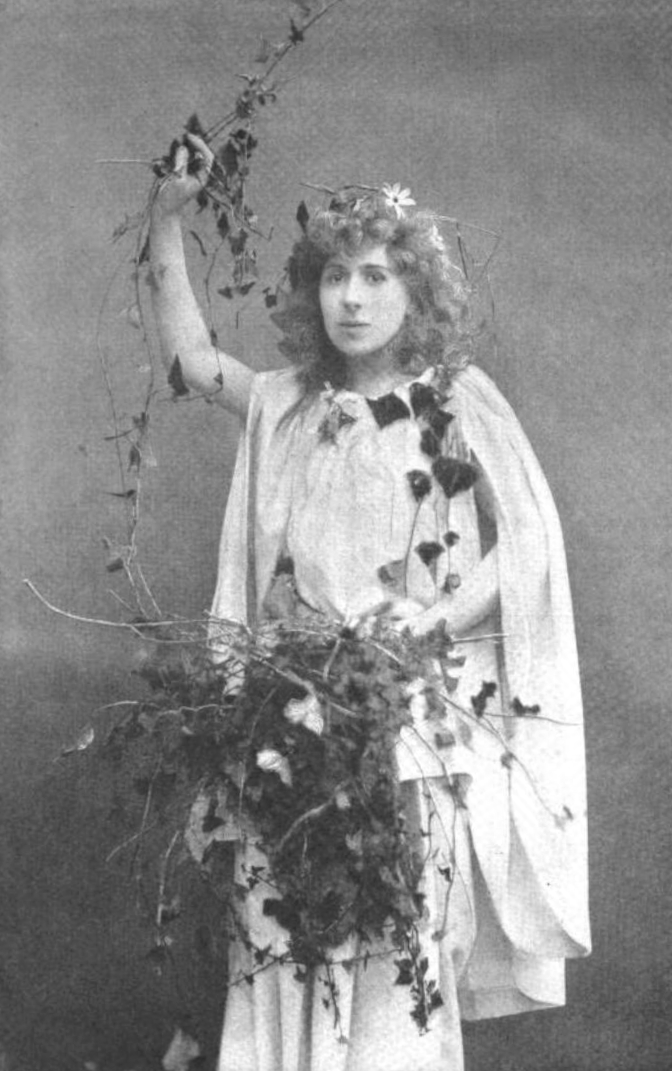
As Ophelia in Hamlet, 1896

When Benson played Cleopatra in 1898, reviewers were astonished by her "terrible rage", one commenting that she treated a struck-down messenger so violently that only the intervention of Charmian had saved his life. One critic later claimed that "Benson and his companies never shook off the aura of amateurism", and that some of the parts Constance Benson had played "owed more to her husband's loyalty than to her talent".

As an actress, Constance Benson worked in the theatre. Still in 1911 she also appeared in leading roles in four silent films, all adaptations of William Shakespeare plays: Richard III, Julius Caesar, Macbeth, and The Taming of the Shrew.

In 1916 Constance became Lady Benson. After F. R. Benson's love affair with the young actress Genevieve Townsend (d. 1927), the couple separated but did not divorce, and in 1940 Benson attended her husband's funeral as his widow.

During the First World War, in which her son Eric was killed, Benson worked in a canteen for soldiers in France. In 1917, her daughter Brynhild married, firstly, Charles Chalmers, in 1931, secondly, Harold G. Janion, and in 1951, thirdly, Richard C. Kelly.

In the 1920s, Benson became a writer, and her published books are her autobiography Mainly Players (1926); two novels, The Chimera (1928), about "an ice-cold, egotistical, twenty-eight-year-old artist", with a frustrated wife, and Cuckoo Oats (1929). She also wrote an acting manual and, in the 1920s, began a drama school, at which one of her students was Elvira Mullens, later Elvira Barney.

Benson's autobiography, Mainly Players, has an introduction by Arthur Machen, who was a member of the Benson company from 1901 to 1909.

She died in London on 19 January 1946. She was living at 1 Scarsdale Villas, Kensington, and had her drama school, attended by John Gielgud, off Earls Court Road.

== Publications ==
- Lady Benson, Mainly Players: Bensonian Memories (London: Butterworth, 1926), with Introduction by Arthur Machen
- The Chimera (London: Butterworth, 1928)
- Cuckoo Oats (London: Butterworth, 1929)
- Lady Benson, One Hundred Practical Hints for the Amateur (London: Samuel French, 1930)
