= Becket (1924 film) =

1924 British film by George Ridgwell

- Directed by: George Ridgwell
- Written by: Eliot Stannard
- Based on: Becket by Alfred Tennyson
- Starring: Frank R. Benson; A.V. Bramble; Bertram Burleigh
- Cinematography: Joseph Rosenthal Jr.
- Production company: Stoll Pictures
- Distributed by: Stoll Pictures
- Release date: 4 February 1924
- Running time: 86 minutes
- Country: United Kingdom
- Languages: Silent; English intertitles

Becket is a 1924 British silent drama film directed by George Ridgwell and starring Frank R. Benson, A.V. Bramble and Bertram Burleigh. It depicts the fatal encounter between Henry II and the Archbishop of Canterbury Thomas Becket.

The film is based on the 1884 play of the same title by Alfred Tennyson. It was produced by Stoll Pictures, Britain's largest film company of the era, at the Cricklewood Studios in London. The film's sets were designed by the art director Walter Murton.

== Cast ==
- Frank R. Benson as Thomas Becket
- A.V. Bramble as Henry II
- Bertram Burleigh as Lord Leicester
- Arthur Burne as Grim
- Mary Clare as Queen Eleanor of Aquitaine
- Clive Currie as Herbert of Bosham
- Bert Daley as De Tracey
- Sydney Folker as De Broc
- Alex G. Hunter as John of Salisbury
- Gladys Jennings as Rosamund de Clifford
- William Lugg as John of Oxford
- C. Hargrave Mansell as Theobald of Canterbury
- Sidney Paxton as Archbishop of York
- Percy Standing as Sir Reginald Fitzurse
- Harry J. Worth as De Brito

== Bibliography ==
- Goble, Alan. The Complete Index to Literary Sources in Film. Walter de Gruyter, 1999.
- Low, Rachael. The History of British Film (Volume 3): The History of the British Film 1914 – 1918. Routledge, 2013.
