= Becket (Tennyson play) =

Historical play (1884)

- Written by: Alfred, Lord Tennyson
- Original language: English
- Genre: Historical
- Setting: England, 1170

Premiere
- Place premiered: Lyceum Theatre, London

Becket is an 1884 historical play by the British writer Alfred, Lord Tennyson, inspired by the murder of Archbishop of Canterbury Thomas Becket by agents of Henry II in 1170.

It was staged at the Lyceum Theatre, London in 1893. The actor Frank Benson became closely associated with the title role for many years, and played it in the 1924 silent film adaptation made by Stoll Pictures and directed by George Ridgwell.

== Bibliography ==
- Low, Rachael. The History of British Film (Volume 3): The History of the British Film 1914 - 1918. Routledge, 2013.
