= Frank Benson (actor) =

English actor and theatre manager (1858–1939)

Sir Frank Benson
- Benson as Hamlet, 1896
- Born: Francis Robert Benson; 4 November 1858; Tunbridge Wells
- Died: 31 December 1939 (aged 81); Kensington
- Education: New College, Oxford
- Spouse: Constance Featherstonhaugh (m. 1886)
- Children: 2
- Relatives: William Arthur Smith Benson (brother); Godfrey Benson, 1st Baron Charnwood (brother); Basil Rathbone (cousin)

Sir Francis Robert Benson (4 November 1858 – 31 December 1939) was an English tennis player and an actor-manager. He founded his own company in 1883 and produced all but two of William Shakespeare's plays. His thirty-year association with the Shakespeare Memorial Theatre and the annual Shakespeare Festival in Stratford-upon-Avon laid down foundations for the creation of the Royal Shakespeare Company after his death.

Benson's company toured widely, with few London seasons, and became a training ground for several generations of young performers, including Henry Ainley, Oscar Asche, Lilian Braithwaite, Isadora Duncan, Nigel Playfair, Nancy Price, Harcourt Williams and Moffat Johnston.

Benson was the older cousin of the Oscar-nominated and Tony-winning actor Basil Rathbone, to whom he bore a strong resemblance.

== Life and career ==
=== Early years ===
As Henry V

As Jack Absolute in The Rivals

As Petruchio in The Taming of the Shrew

As Richard II

As Shylock in The Merchant of Venice

As Romeo

Benson was born at Eden House, Tunbridge Wells, Kent, on 4 November 1858, the third son and fourth child of William Benson (1816–1887), a barrister, and his wife, Elizabeth, née Soulsby Smith (1830–1892). Their eldest son, William Arthur Smith Benson, became a well-known architect and designer, and the youngest, Godfrey Rathbone Benson, later Baron Charnwood, was a Liberal politician. In 1871 Benson went to Winchester College, where a master inspired him with a love of Shakespeare. From there he went to New College, Oxford in 1878, where he distinguished himself as an athlete (winning the Inter-university three miles) and as an amateur actor. In 1880 he mounted a successful production of Aeschylus's Agamemnon, given in the original Greek; Benson played Clytemnestra. This was followed by Euripides's Alcestis the following year, in which Benson played Apollo.

=== Tennis career ===
From 1880 to 1882, Benson had a brief career as a tennis player. He won his only title at the Bournemouth Open Tournament in 1880, and was a semifinalist at the 1882 Wimbledon Championship.

=== Acting career ===
In July 1881, Benson and his Oxford Agamemnon Society took the Imperial Theatre, London, for a single performance of Romeo and Juliet. The performance was not admired; The Stage found it "one of the very worst it has been our misfortune to witness", and commented that Benson's Romeo resembled George Grossmith's Bunthorne in Patience. Benson then studied with Hermann Vezin and was encouraged by Ellen Terry, who persuaded Henry Irving to take Benson on to play Paris in Romeo and Juliet at the Lyceum in 1882. Irving was unimpressed and did not extend the young actor's contract. Terry suggested that Benson should join a touring company where he could gain more experience and better parts than in London. He joined first Miss Alleyne's company, and then that of Walter Bentley, which performed Shakespeare and classic comedies in the north of England and Scotland. The Times described the circumstances in which Benson came to take over the company in 1883:

One night the manager was missing, and so were the salaries. A quick interchange of telegrams between Benson and his father; the necessary money was received; and the company ... became not Bentley's but Benson's.

Helped by further subsidies from his father, Benson built up his company and extended its touring range to the whole of the country and beyond. In 1886, he married a member of his company, Constance Featherstonhaugh. They had two children, Eric William (1887–1916, killed at the battle of the Somme), and Brynhild Lucy (1888–1974).

== Benson's company ==
In 1886, Charles Flower, the philanthropist behind the Shakespeare Memorial Theatre, invited Benson and his company to open that year's Shakespeare Festival at Stratford-upon-Avon. From then until 1919 Benson presented all but five of the annual Stratford seasons, having taken the role of manager from 1888. The critic James Agate said that Benson's company "was the nursery of modern Shakespearean acting", and both the Royal Shakespeare Company and the National Theatre have some of their roots in his company and productions.

Each year, Benson gave one new production at Stratford, which was given on Shakespeare's birthday and became known as the Birthday Play. These productions, often of rarely performed plays, were subsidised by Flower or his fellow governors of the theatre, who paid for the design and making of the costumes and sets. Benson was then able to tour the production with his other plays. The extension of the Stratford repertoire rescued many Shakespeare plays from neglect, such as Timon of Athens, The Winter's Tale and King John, although the most popular plays were regularly staged as well. The three most successful at the box office were The Merchant of Venice, The Taming of the Shrew and The Merry Wives of Windsor, which were presented so often that members of Benson's company called their repertoire The Merry Shrews of Venice.

Benson's productions were not avant-garde: he liked traditional staging and design, but he was the first producer of modern times to give Hamlet uncut, he purged the text of Richard III from Colly Cibber's additions, and brought Richard II back into the regular repertory. During his thirty-year association with Stratford, Benson staged all but two of Shakespeare's plays. (Note: The missing two were Titus Andronicus and Troilus and Cressida.) In 1910 Benson was awarded the freedom of the borough of Stratford, the first actor so honoured since David Garrick in 1769. He was later appointed as a governor of the Memorial Theatre and a trustee of Shakespeare's birthplace.

When not at Stratford, the Benson company's repertoire included some non-Shakespearean classics and modern plays, but Shakespeare predominated. Benson's mission, in the words of The Times was:

to carry Shakespeare far and wide over the United Kingdom, to dissolve, in cathedral city, in dingy manufacturing town, and in centres of agricultural life, the lingering prejudice against the stage play, to rescue Shakespeare from death in school examinations, and the never-opened gift-book on parlour tables, and to give a glimpse of the meaning and the value of art.

Another celebrated aspect of Benson's life and work was the training of new generations of actors. A touring company paying modest salaries inevitably suffered a constant loss of its leading players to stardom and better pay in the West End, and Benson's company had a continual influx and outflow of actors. In 1913 The Times printed a list of more than 90 "Old Bensonians" – eminent actors and actresses who "learnt their art under the inspiration of Mr Benson". The men included Henry Ainley, Oscar Asche, Matheson Lang, Nigel Playfair, William Poel and Harcourt Williams. Among the women were Lilian Braithwaite, Isadora Duncan, Kitty Loftus and Nancy Price. (Note: Among other eminent Old Bensonians were Janet Achurch, William Armstrong, Leslie Banks, O. B. Clarence, Robert Donat, J. B. Fagan, Sir Cedric Hardwicke, H. O. Nicholson, and Benson's distant cousin Basil Rathbone.)

=== London ===
Although Benson's chief successes were gained out of London he sought recognition in the West End. He presented his first London season at the Globe Theatre in 1889, beginning on 19 December with A Midsummer Night's Dream. The notices were highly favourable: one reviewer declared that the production was the best in living memory "so conscientious and complete, and so poetical and picturesque". It ran for what was then a record 110 performances. Benson, who hated long runs and preferred a repertory system, added The Taming of the Shrew, Hamlet, and Othello to the season, but according to the theatre historian J. P. Wearing this confused a London public unfamiliar with repertory seasons, and Benson lost money.

Benson did not return to the West End for ten years, taking the Lyceum for four months in 1900. He had subsequent West End seasons at the Comedy (1901), Adelphi (1905), St James's (1910), Shaftesbury (1914), Court (1915), and St Martin's (1920). A rare appearance away from his own company was in May 1916 when at a special tercentennial "Shakespeare Day" at the Theatre Royal, Drury Lane he played the title role in Julius Caesar in an all-star cast. At the end of the performance George V bestowed a knighthood on him in the royal box, the first instance of an actor being knighted in a theatre.

in 1911 Benson appeared in four films of Shakespeare plays, much abbreviated: Richard III, in the title role; Julius Caesar, in which he played Antony; The Taming of the Shrew as Petruchio; and Macbeth, in the title role.

=== First World War and later years ===
Benson staged patriotic performances of Henry V during the early years of the war, but longed to make a more tangible contribution to the war effort. He was rejected for active service because of his age. He temporarily abandoned the stage and drove an ambulance in France, receiving the Croix de Guerre on the battlefield for rescuing wounded men on the front line. His wife ran a canteen for soldiers in France. Benson was knighted in 1916.

After the war Benson made his last appearance at Stratford in 1919, and then toured South Africa in 1921–22. At about this time he had an affair with an actress, Geneviève Smeek, also known as Townsend (1898–1927); the Bensons separated although they did not divorce. On his return from South Africa he toured the provinces giving farewell performances, and wrote what Wearing calls "a book of genial if vague reminiscences" and a brief handbook of advice about the acting profession. In 1924 he starred in the film Becket based on Tennyson's play of the same title, the title role of which he had played on stage. From 1927 to 1929 he toured with The School for Scandal, She Stoops to Conquer and The Rivals.

Benson made his last appearance on stage as Dr Caius in The Merry Wives of Windsor, at the Winter Garden, London on 26 December 1932 in a production by the Old Bensonian Oscar Asche. An injury caused by a bicyclist in March 1933 ended Benson's career. He was awarded a civil list pension and retired to Kensington, London, where he died on 31 December 1939, aged 81. After a private funeral he was cremated at Golders Green crematorium. A memorial service at St Martin-in-the-Fields on 12 January 1940, led by the Bishop of London, was attended by large numbers of the theatrical profession, with readings and an address by Old Bensonians.

== Notes, references and sources ==
=== Sources ===
- Beauman, Sally (1982). The Royal Shakespeare Company: A History of Ten Decades. Oxford and New York: Oxford University Press. ISBN 978-0-19-212209-4.
- Parker, John, ed. (1939). Who's Who in the Theatre (ninth ed.). London: Sir Isaac Pitman and Sons. OCLC 473894893.
