= Last surviving United States war veterans =

This is an incomplete list of the last surviving veterans of American wars. Exactly who is the last surviving veteran is often an issue of contention, especially with records from long-ago wars. The "last man standing" was often very young at the time of enlistment and in many cases had lied about his age to gain entry into the service, which confuses matters further.

== 17th century ==
=== American Indian Wars (1622–1774) ===
- Samuel Murphy (1758–1851) – Virginia colonists. Last participant of Lord Dunmore's War.
- Noah Johnson (1698–1798) – New England colonists. Last participant of Lovewell's War.

== 18th century ==
=== French and Indian War (1754–1763) ===
- John Owen (1741–1843) – British Army. Enlisted in 1758. Also fought in the Revolutionary War.
- Jonathan Benjamin (1738–1841) – British Army. Also fought in the Revolutionary War.

=== American Revolutionary War (1775–1783) ===
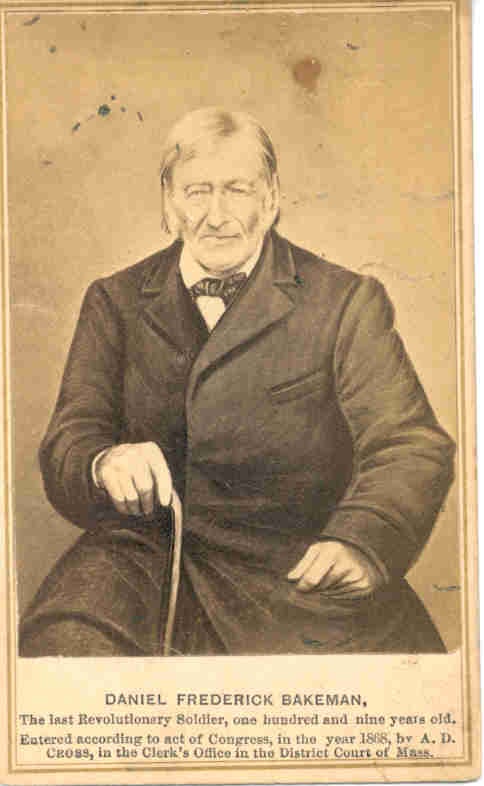
A photograph of Daniel Frederick Bakeman (1759–1869). Though not mentioned in the 1864 book The Last Men of the Revolution, he was the last surviving veteran of the American Revolution to have been granted a pension.

- Daniel Frederick Bakeman (1759–1869) – Continental Army. Last veteran drawing a pension awarded by Congress; granted a pension in 1867 even though he could not prove his service.
- John Gray (1764–1868) – Continental Army. Last verifiable veteran. Served at Yorktown. Six month service period was too short to qualify for pension. Granted a pension in 1867.
- James Robinson (1753–1868) – Continental Army. Last African American veteran. Served at Yorktown and Brandywine. Awarded Gold Medal of Valor.
- Lemuel Cook (1759–1866) – Continental Army. Last cavalryman. Served with the 2nd Light Dragoons.
- Elijah Churchill (1755–1841) – Continental Army. Last Badge of Military Merit recipient.
- William Richardson (1765–1873) – Claimed to have served in an Ohio militia and in a Continental Line.

=== American Indian Wars (1775–1924) ===
- Frederick Fraske (1872–1973) – U.S. Army. Last Army veteran.
- John Daw (1870–1965) – U.S. Army. Last Indian Scout.
- Dewey Beard (1857–1955) – Lakota Tribe. Last Native American participant of the Battle of the Little Big Horn. Also survived Wounded Knee.
- John Winchell Cullen (1838–1939) – U.S. Army. Fought in the Yakima War.
- Henry L. Riggs (1812–1911) – U.S. Army. Served in the Black Hawk War.

=== Shays's Rebellion (1786–1787) ===
- David Whitney (1767–1867) – Massachusetts State Militia.

=== Whiskey Rebellion (1791–1794) ===
- Michael Edwards (1767?–1876) – Pennsylvania State Militia.

== 19th century ==
=== War of 1812 (1812–1815) ===
Hiram Cronk (1800–1905), the last surviving veteran of the War of 1812.

- Hiram Cronk (1800–1905) – New York Militia.
- James Hooper Jr. (1804–1898) – U.S. Navy. Served on the schooner Comet during the Battle of Baltimore.
- Aaron Stafford (1787–1885) – Major, New York Militia. Last surviving veteran of the War of 1812 known to have held an officer's commission. Wounded at Battle of Queenston Heights.

=== Toledo War (1835–1836) ===
- Lewis W. Pearl (1815–1914) – Michigan State Militia. Later served in the Mexican-American War and the Civil War.

=== Texas Revolution (1835–1836) ===
- William Physick Zuber (1820–1913) – Texian Army.

=== Dorr Rebellion (1841–1842) ===
- Wanton Briggs (1821–1923) – Rhode Island State Militia. Last "Charterite".

=== Bear Flag Revolt (1846) ===
- John Grider (1826–1924) – California Republic Militia.

=== Mexican–American War (1846–1848) ===
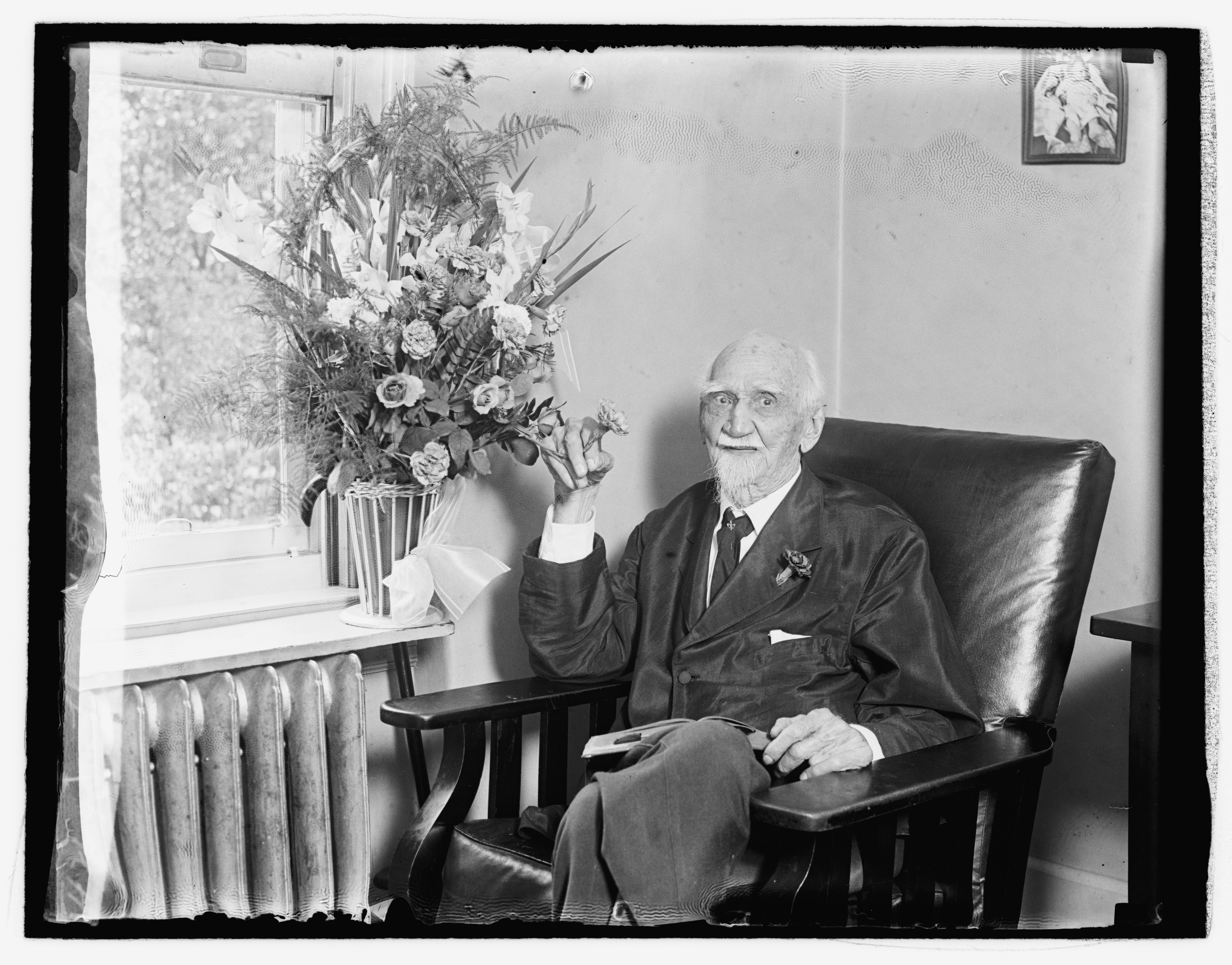
Owen Thomas Edgar (1831–1929), the last surviving U.S. veteran of the Mexican–American War.

- Owen Thomas Edgar (1831–1929) – U.S. Navy. Served on USS Potomac and USS Allegheny.
- William Fitzhugh Buckner (1828–1929) – U.S. Army. Fought at Taos.

=== Bleeding Kansas (1854–1861) ===
- Israel Adam Broadsword (1846–1952) – Free-Stater. Joined a Kansas Home Guard unit in 1859 to protect against raids. Later served in the Civil War.
- John Brown (1844–1940) – Border Ruffian. Participated in the Lawrence Massacre with Quantrill's Raiders.

=== American Civil War (1861–1865) ===
- Albert Henry Woolson (1850–1956) – Union Army. Last verified Union veteran.
- James Albert Hard (1843–1953) – Union Army. Last combat veteran. Served at First Bull Run, Antietam, and Chancellorsville.
- Pleasant Riggs Crump (1847–1951) – Confederate Army. Last verified Confederate veteran. See Last surviving Confederate veterans.
- Alden G. Howell (1841–1947) – Confederate Army. Last commissioned Confederate officer.
- Henry Doll (1847–1947) – Union Navy. Last surviving Union sailor. Served on the USS Portsmouth and USS Brooklyn.
- James Frederick Lyon (1843–1946) – Union Army. Last commissioned Union officer.
- James Burns (1845–1944) – Union Marine Corps. Last surviving Union Marine veteran. Enlisted 9 Sep 1862.
- Samuel B. Grant (1845–1944) – Confederate Marine Corps. Last surviving Confederate Marine veteran. Served with the Marine Guard attached to the CSS Fredericksburg.
- William Sickles (1844–1938) – Union Army. Last Medal of Honor recipient.
- Aaron Daggett (1837–1938) – Union Army. Last surviving General of the Civil War.
- Billy Rufus Stanford (1850–1937) – Confederate Navy. Last surviving Confederate sailor. Defended Columbus, Georgia during Sherman's March to the Sea with Company C of the Naval Battalion.
- Adelbert Ames (1835–1933) – Union Army. Last surviving General of the Regular U.S. Army.
- Oliver Otis Howard (1830–1909) – Union Army. Last surviving General to have held the permanent rank of a general in the regular U.S. Army.
- John McCausland Jr. (1836–1927) – Confederate Army, Last surviving Confederate General, Held the rank of Brigadier General, famous for the ransom of Hagerstown, Maryland

=== Korean Expedition (1871) ===
- William F. Lukes (1847–1923) – U.S. Navy. Served on USS Colorado. Last Medal of Honor recipient.

=== Spanish–American War (1898) ===
- Jones Morgan (1882–1993) – U.S. Army. Claimed to have served in the 9th Cavalry.
- Jasper Garrison (1880–1987) – U.S. Army. Last verified veteran.
- Jesse D. Langdon (1881–1975) – U.S. Army. Last member of the Rough Riders.
- John Davis (1877–1970) – U.S. Navy. Served on USS Marblehead. Last Medal of Honor recipient.

=== Second Samoan Civil War (1898–99) ===
- Bruno Albert Forsterer (1869–1957) – U.S. Marine Corps. Last Medal of Honor recipient.

=== Banana Wars (1898–1934) ===
- Donald Leroy Truesdell (1906–1993) – U.S. Marine Corps. Served in Nicaragua. Last Medal of Honor recipient.
- Herman H. Hanneken (1893–1986) – U.S. Marine Corps. Served in Haiti. Last Medal of Honor recipient.
- George M. Lowry (1889–1981) – U.S. Navy. Served on USS Florida at Veracruz. Last Medal of Honor recipient.
- Roswell Winans (1887–1968) – U.S. Marine Corps. Served in Dominican Republic. Last Medal of Honor recipient.

=== Boxer Rebellion (1899–1901) ===
- Nathan E. Cook (1885–1992) – U.S. Navy.
- Walter Pleate (1876–1985) – U.S. Army. Also served in the Philippine–American War.
- William Seach (1877–1978) – U.S. Navy. Served on USS Newark. Last Medal of Honor recipient.

=== Philippine–American War (1899–1902) ===
- Nathan E. Cook (1885–1992) – U.S. Navy. Served on USS Pensacola. Also served in Boxer Rebellion.
- Walter Pleate (1876–1985) – U.S. Army.
- John Thomas Kennedy (1885–1969) – U.S. Army. Last Medal of Honor recipient.

== 20th century ==
=== Border War (1910–1919) ===
- Samuel Goldberg (1900–2006) – U.S. Cavalry.

=== World War I (1914–1918) ===
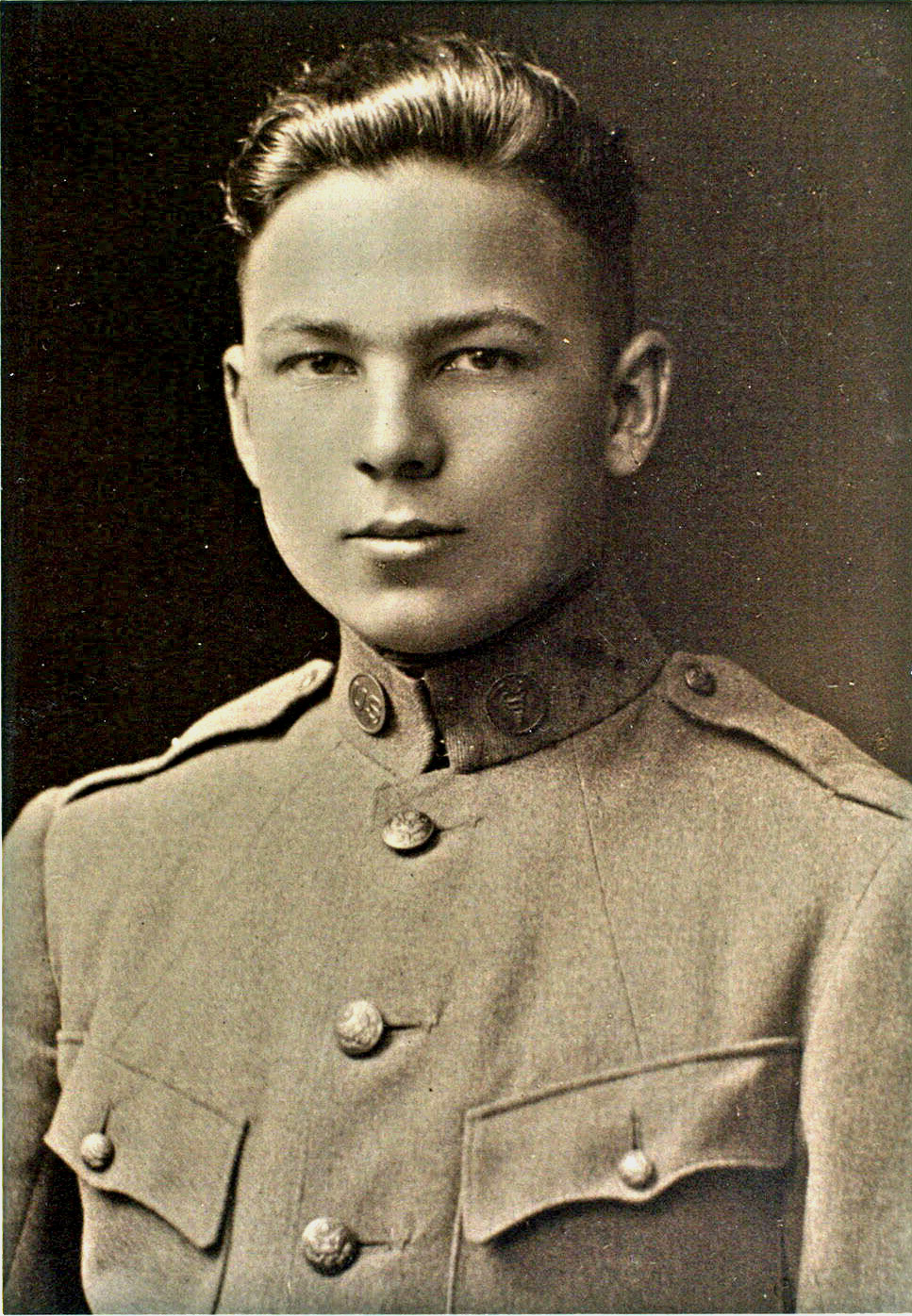
Frank Buckles (1901–2011), shown here in this recruitment photo, was the last verified American soldier to have served in World War I.

- Frank Woodruff Buckles (1901–2011) – U.S. Army. Last U.S. veteran, served with the 1st Fort Riley Casual Detachment.
- Lloyd Brown (1901–2007) – U.S. Navy. Served on USS New Hampshire.
- Howard Ramsey (1898–2007) – U.S. Army. Last combat veteran.
- Albert Wagner (1899–2007) – U.S. Marine Corps. Served in the 6th Marine Regiment.
- Moses Hardy (1894–2006) – U.S. Army. Last African-American veteran.
- James William Pearson (1895–1993) – Royal Air Force. Last American flying ace. Served in No. 23 Squadron RAF.
- Arthur Raymond Brooks (1895–1991) – Air Service, United States Army. Last American flying ace to serve in a U.S. unit. Served in the 22d Aero Squadron.
- Edouard Izac (1891–1990) – U.S. Navy. Served on USS Florida and USS President Lincoln. Last Medal of Honor recipient.
- Henry Forster (1889–1989) – Aéronautique Militaire. Last American member of the La Fayette Escadrille.

=== Pancho Villa Expedition (1916–1917) ===
- Mark Matthews (1894–2005) – U.S. Army.

=== Allied intervention in the Russian Civil War (1918–1925) ===
American and other Allied forces were involved in the Polar Bear Expedition which began during World War I and continued into the Russian Civil War

- Warren V. Hileman (1901–2005) – U.S. Army. Served in the 27th Infantry Regiment as part of the American Expeditionary Force Siberia.
- Harold Gunnes (1899–2003) – U.S. Navy. Served on USS Olympia. Also attached to the 339th Infantry Regiment as part of the Polar Bear Expedition.

=== Spanish Civil War (1936–1939) ===
- Raphael Buch Brage (1915–2018) – International Brigades.
- Delmer Berg (1915–2016) – International Brigades. Volunteered in 1938. Served in anti-aircraft in the Abraham Lincoln Brigade. (Note: Berg was frequently cited as the last volunteer of the International Brigades from the United States prior to Brage's discovery.)

=== World War II (1939–1945) ===
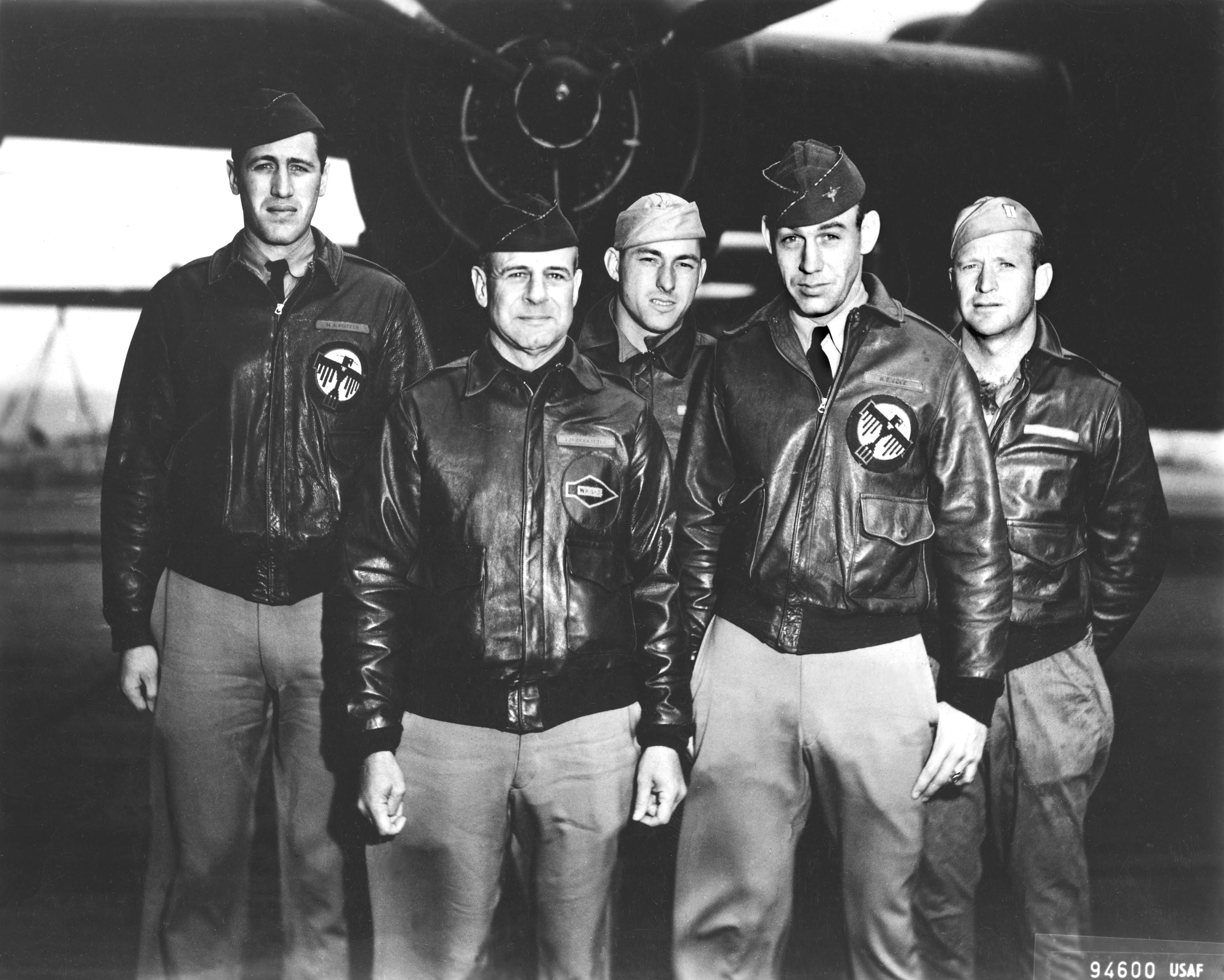
Richard E. Cole (1915–2019), shown second-from-right in this 1942 photograph, was a World War II veteran and the last living participant of the Doolittle Raid.

- James Bollich (1921–) – U.S. Army Air Forces. Last American survivor of the Bataan Death March.
- Lou Conter (1921–2024) – U.S. Navy. Last surviving crew member of the USS Arizona. (Note: Conter, an enlisted U.S. Navy sailor, is the last survivor of the sinking of the USS Arizona. The last survivor of the ship's Marine Detachment was Lamar Crawford (1920–2011). The last surviving commissioned officer was Joseph Langdell (1914–2015).)
- Warren "Red" Upton (1919–2024) U.S. Navy. Last surviving crew member of the USS Utah (BB-31).
- Hershel Woodrow "Woody" Williams (1923–2022) – U.S. Marine Corps. Last Medal of Honor recipient. (Note: Williams was also the last surviving Marine recipient. The last surviving Army Medal of Honor recipient was Charles Coolidge (1921–2021). Coolidge was also the last surviving recipient who had been awarded the medal during the war.)
- Bradford Freeman (1924–2022) – U.S. Army. Last surviving member of Easy Company. (Note: Freeman was an enlisted soldier. The last surviving commissioned officer of Easy Company was Edward Shames (1922–2021).)
- Frank S. Losonsky (1920–2020) – American Volunteer Group. Last member of the Flying Tigers. Enlisted in the USAAC in 1939. Joined the AVG in 1941.
- Richard E. Cole (1915–2019) – U.S. Army Air Forces. Last participant of the Doolittle Raid (Jimmy Doolittle's co-pilot).
- Carl Kice Brown (1917–2017) – American Volunteer Group. Last pilot of the Flying Tigers. Joined in 1941.
- Steve Pisanos (1919–2016) – RAF. Last pilot of the Eagle Squadrons. Joined in 1941.
- Bill Bower (1917–2011) – U.S. Army Air Forces. Last pilot of Doolittle Raid.
- Lemuel R. Custis (1915–2005) – U.S. Army Air Forces – Tuskegee Airmen. Last surviving graduating member of original aviation cadet class, Class 42-C.

=== Korean War (1950–1953) ===
- Charles G. Cleveland (1927–2021) – U.S. Air Force. Last flying ace.

== See also ==
- Military history of the United States
- List of last survivors of American slavery
- List of last surviving veterans of military insurgencies and wars
- List of last surviving veterans of military operations
- List of last surviving Canadian war veterans
- List of last surviving Brazilian war veterans
- Last European veterans by war
