= USS Favorite =

U.S. tugboat used in WW1 and WW2

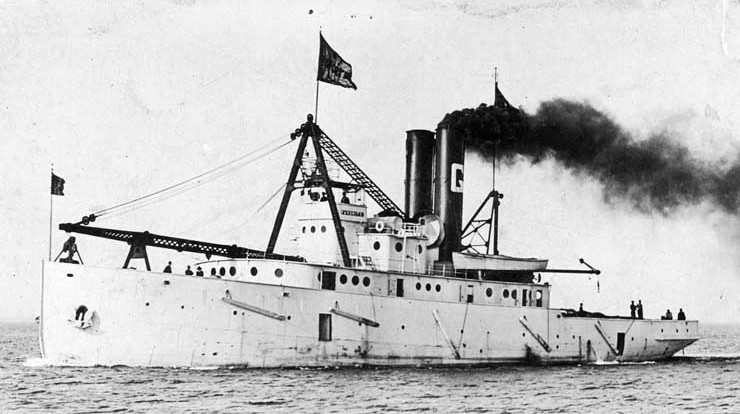
- SS Favorite (American salvage tug, 1907) possibly photographed soon after completion at Buffalo, New York, in 1907.

History

United States
- Name: USS Favorite
- Namesake: Former name retained
- Laid down: date unknown
- Completed: 1907 in Buffalo, New York
- Acquired: by the Navy on 23 January 1918
- Commissioned: 1 February 1918 as USS Favorite (ID # 1385)
- Decommissioned: 3 April 1920
- In service: 24 October 1940
- Out of service: 13 January 1948
- Reclassified: YX-10, redesignated IX-45 on 8 March 1941
- Stricken: 19 February 1948

General characteristics
- Type: Tugboat
- Tonnage: 1,223 GRT
- Length: 196 ft (60 m)
- Beam: 43 ft (13 m)
- Draft: 9 ft (2.7 m)
- Speed: 14 knots (26 km/h; 16 mph)
- Armament: 3 × 3 in (76 mm) guns

USS Favorite (SP-1385/ID-1385/IX-45) was a large 1,223 gross register tons (GRT) tugboat (later converted into a seagoing tug) acquired by the U.S. Navy during World War I. She performed a variety of work for the navy, including icebreaking, salvage, wrecking, and tugboat services. She was loaned to Panamanian authorities after World War I, but was returned to the U.S. Navy to do her part in the Panama Canal area during World War II as the IX-45.

== A tugboat built in Buffalo ==
Favorite (No. 1385), a tug, was completed at Buffalo, New York, in 1907. In 1915, while still under the ownership of the Great Lakes Towing and Wrecking Company, the "Favorite" helped to salvage the SS Eastland. In the summer of 1916, the Favorite was used in a failed salvage attempt of the wreck of the SS Charles S. Price. It was purchased by the Navy on 23 January 1918 and commissioned on 1 February as USS Favorite (ID # 1385).

== World War I service ==
The ship performed icebreaker duty off the coast of Maine until March, when she was refitted for overseas service as a salvage and wrecking ship. The Favorite arrived at Brest, France, in August 1918 and was used to search for sunken ships and lost material, as well as to salvage and assist grounded ships including the USS Narragansett which went aground on 31 January 1919 off the Isle of Wight. The Favorite 's commanding officer, Lieutenant Nathan E. Cook received a letter of commendation from the Secretary of the Navy for the salvage of the Narragansett.

The Favorite continued to conduct salvage operations at Brest and also in England until departing for the United States in June 1919. The ship was decommissioned at New York City in April 1920, converted to a seagoing tug, and turned over to the Department of the Interior on 3 April 1920, and on 1 July 1931 was loaned to the Panama Canal.

== Post-war status ==
Although no longer serving in the Navy, Favorite remained Navy property and continued to be listed in Navy publications as an Unclassified District Craft. She was assigned the file symbol YX-10 in the Navy Filing Manual, although this, along with the manual's IX symbol for larger unclassified vessels, was used solely for filing paperwork and not as a designator for the ship. In early 1941 the YX and IX file symbols were consolidated and Favorite became IX-45, and at the same time the IX symbols were added to the Naval Vessel Register as designators for the ships.

== World War II service ==
In the meantime, Favorite resumed her Navy service when she was reacquired by the 15th Naval District on 24 October 1940 and was reclassified IX-45 on 8 March 1941. She continued to operate in the Panama Canal and was once again assigned to the Panama Canal Mechanical Division on 1 November 1943.

== Final disposition ==
The ship was returned to Navy custody for the last time on 13 January 1948, stricken from the Navy List 19 February 1948, and sold by the State Department's Foreign Liquidation Commission in March 1948. She became the Peruvian Navy's submarine salvage ship Guardian Rios, later Rios, and was operated by the Callao Port Authority. Rios was removed from the Peruvian Navy List in July 1958.

== Awards ==
- World War I Victory Medal
- American Defense Service Medal with "BASE" clasp
- American Campaign Medal
- World War II Victory Medal
