= Nathan E. Cook =

United States Navy officer (1885–1992)

Nathan Edward Cook
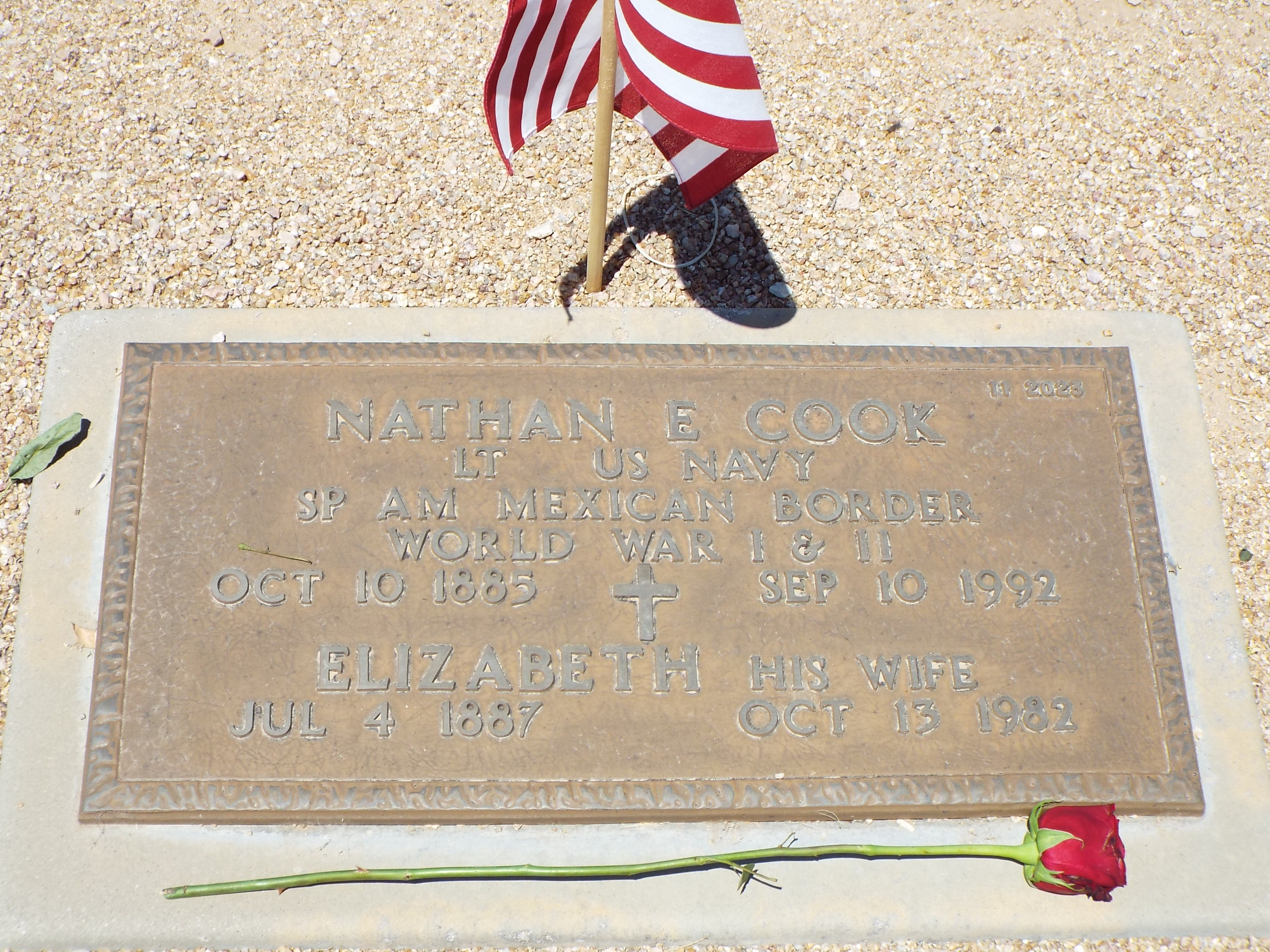
- Born: October 10, 1885; Hersey, Michigan, U.S.
- Died: September 10, 1992 (aged 106); Phoenix, Arizona, U.S.
- Burial place: National Memorial Cemetery of Arizona
- Military career
- Allegiance: United States
- Branch: United States Navy
- Service years: 1901–1942
- Rank: Lieutenant
- Units: USS Pensacola
- Conflicts: Philippine–American War; Boxer Rebellion; Mexican Border War; World War I; World War II

Nathan Edward Cook (October 10, 1885 – September 10, 1992) was an American Navy officer and veteran of the Philippine–American War, Boxer Rebellion, and both World War I and World War II. He enlisted in the Navy in 1901 and retired in 1942 after more than four decades of service.

Cook was widely reported during his later life as the oldest known surviving American war veteran. He died in 1992 at the age of 106. Although contemporary accounts sometimes described him as a Spanish–American War veteran, he enlisted after that war had ended; he was instead a veteran of the Philippine–American War and was the last living member of the United Spanish War Veterans.

== Early life ==
Cook was born on October 10, 1885, in Hersey, Michigan, to William and Ellen Cook. His father died in 1895 and his mother later remarried. The family subsequently moved to Kansas City, Missouri. Cook left a 50-cent-a-day job at a packing plant to join the United States Navy. He lied about his age (then 15) in order to join, enlisting on April 9, 1901. He was inspired to join after seeing a recruiting poster which said, "Join the Navy and See the World." He was assigned to the USS Pensacola.

== Career ==
He served during the Philippine–American War, which began shortly after the First Philippine Republic had been declared. The Philippine–American War lasted from 1899 until July 4, 1902 – one year after Cook's enlistment in the Navy. Cook also saw service in the Boxer Rebellion and clashes along the U.S.–Mexico border. After 12 and a half years of service as an enlisted man, he was appointed to the warrant officer rank of boatswain on January 11, 1913.

During the First World War, he commanded a submarine chaser that sank two German U-boats. Cook was promoted on August 15, 1918, to the temporary rank of lieutenant and was given command of the tugboat USS Favorite on the 21st of the same month.

Cook received a letter of commendation from the Secretary of the Navy for his role in salvaging the USS Narragansett in February 1919. The text of his commendation reads: "As Commanding Officer of the U.S.S. Favorite he took a conspicuous and creditable part in the operation of salvaging the U.S.S. Narragansett."

After the First World War, Cook was reduced to his permanent rank of Boatswain and then promoted to Chief Boatswain on January 11, 1919.

During the early days of World War II, Cook was stationed at Port-au-Prince, Haiti, and in Panama. As of November 1, 1940 he was the executive officer of the SS Mormacyork which served as a transport between the United States and South America.

Cook retired on April 1, 1942, after 40 years in the Navy. He was promoted to the permanent rank of lieutenant the same day in recognition of his service in the First World War. He once said his Navy life was tough but that it beat living on his Missouri farm. During his naval career, Cook's shipmates nicknamed him "Northeast," derived from his first two initials.

== Personal life ==
Cook met his wife, Elizabeth (1887–1982) in New York in 1901 and they married on October 29, 1905. Elizabeth died two weeks before what would have been their 77th wedding anniversary in 1982.

== Later life and legacy ==
Cook spent his last years at the residential section of the VA hospital in Phoenix, Arizona and was buried beside his wife at the National Memorial Cemetery of Arizona.

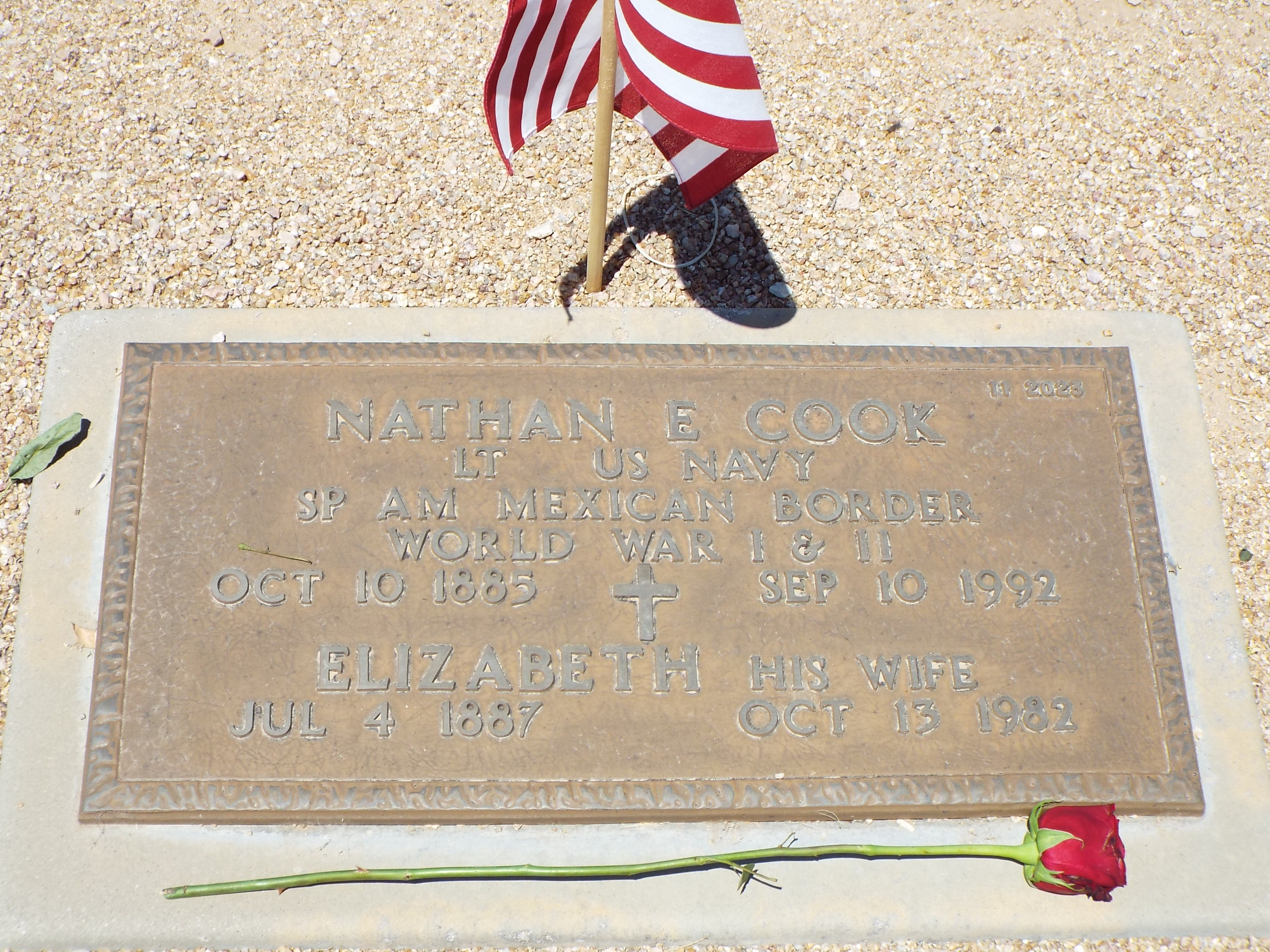
Grave site of Nathan Edward Cook (1885–1992) and his wife Elizabeth Cook (1887–1982).

Cook was the last living member of the United Spanish War Veterans (USWV). The USWV was an organization of veterans of the Spanish–American War and the Philippine–American War who had served between 1898 and 1902. Cook was eligible to be a member of the USWV because he had enlisted during the Philippine–American War.

Cook was often referred to as a veteran of the Spanish–American War, but the Spanish–American War officially ended in August 1898 and Cook did not enlist in the Navy until April 1901. Because Cook was a member of the USWV, many assumed that he was a Spanish–American War veteran.

Cook was mistakenly recognized as the longest surviving U.S. veteran of that war at the time of his death in 1992 (although there is a claim that Jones Morgan was a Spanish–American War veteran and survived longer). Cook was, however, likely the last surviving veteran of the Philippine–American War.

When Cook turned 104, he received a congratulatory letter from George H. W. Bush and guests watched a video presentation about his life. Cook's younger daughter, Eleanor Kay of Tempe, Arizona, also said around this time: "He was a Navy man throughout. Navy. Navy. Navy. He lived for the Navy. Yes, he had a wife and family, and he enjoyed coming home to see them. But he also enjoyed getting back to his ship."

== Awards ==
- Navy Commendation Ribbon (Later changed to the Navy Commendation Medal.)
- Philippine Campaign Medal
- China Campaign Medal
- Mexican Service Medal
- First World War Victory Medal
- American Defense Service Medal
- American Campaign Medal
- World War Two Victory Medal

== See also ==
- Last surviving United States war veterans
