= St. Adalbert Cemetery =

Roman Catholic cemetery in Niles, Cook County, Illinois

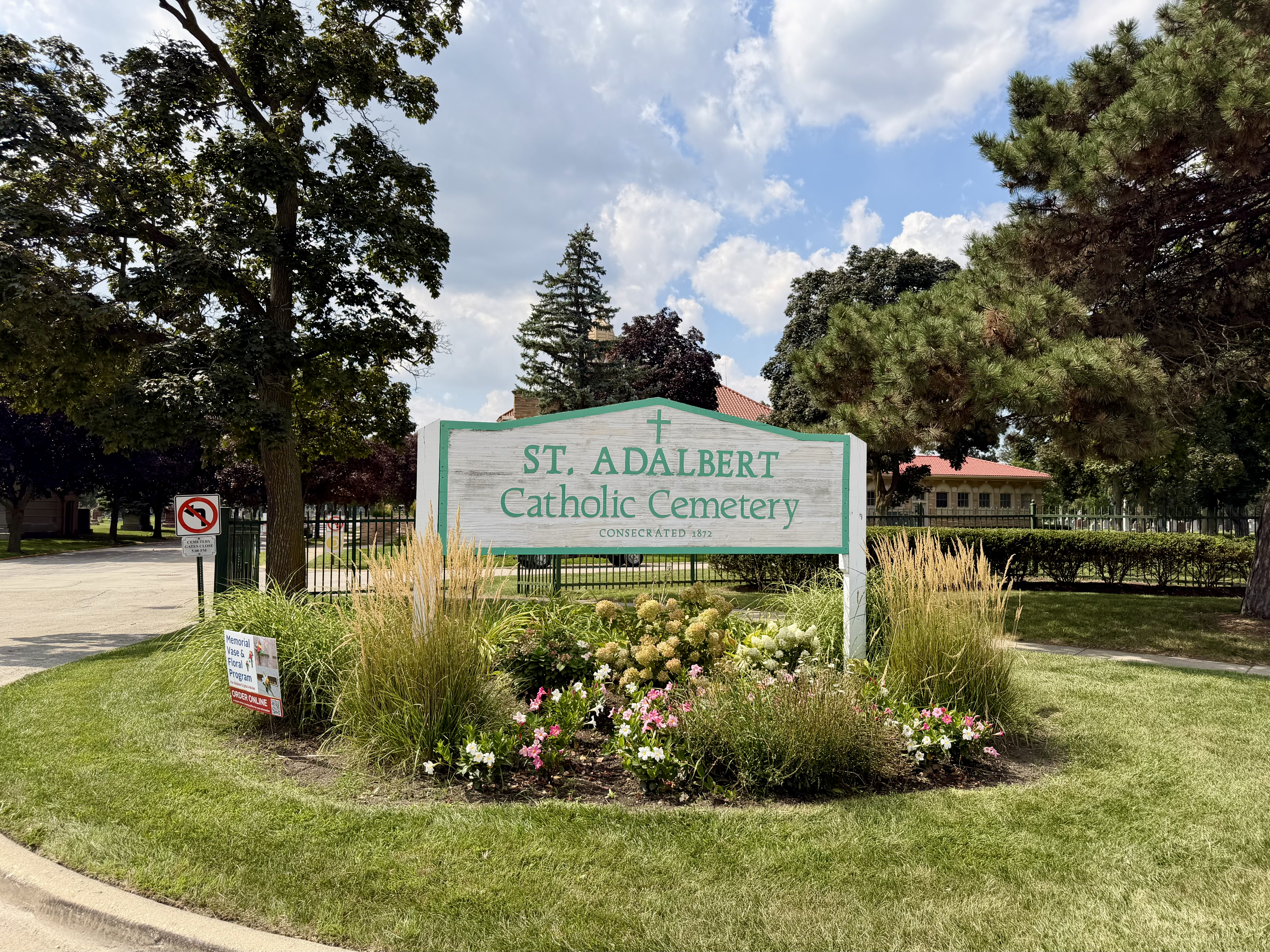
- Main entrance in 2026
- Interactive map of St. Adalbert Cemetery

Details
- Established: 1872
- Location: 6800 North Milwaukee Avenue, Niles, Illinois
- Country: United States
- Coordinates: 42°00′21″N 87°48′03″W
- Owned by: Roman Catholic Archdiocese of Chicago
- No. of interments: >90,000
- Website: website
- Find a Grave: St. Adalbert Cemetery

St. Adalbert Cemetery (Polish: Cmentarz św. Wojciecha) is a Roman Catholic cemetery located in Niles, Illinois. It is bordered by Milwaukee Avenue on the east, Albion and Hayes Streets on the south, and Harlem Avenue on the west. Various non-cemetery properties separate it from Touhy Avenue on the north. It is intersected at its center from north to south by Newark Avenue. Its main entrance is on Milwaukee Avenue, approximately midway between Devon and Touhy.

== History ==
The cemetery is named for Saint Adalbert, the patron saint of Poland. The Mary, Mother of God Garden Crypt Complex was opened in 1990 in the northwest corner of the cemetery. It contains approximately 6,000 crypts.

On May 17, 2009, at the cemetery was unveiled the Katyń Memorial, dedicated to the victims of Katyn massacre, a series of mass executions of nearly 22,000 Polish military and police officers, border guards, and intelligentsia prisoners of war carried out in 1940 by the People's Commissariat for Internal Affairs of the Soviet Union. The sculpture was designed by Wojciech Seweryn.

== Notable burials ==
Chronologically ordered by year of death.

- Vincent Barzynski (1838–1899) Roman Catholic priest and organizer of the Polish-American community in Chicago
- Victims of the Iroquois Theatre Fire (1903)
- Peter Kiolbassa (1837–1905) Chicago Treasurer and Commissioner of Public Works
- Victims of the Eastland Disaster (1915)
- Anthony Michalek (1878–1916) US Congressman
- Peter Wojtalewicz (1898–1917) first Chicago soldier killed during World War I
- Wladyslaw (Wladislaus) Dyniewicz (1843–1928) founder of Gazeta Polska, the first Polish newspaper in Chicago
- John Smulski (1867–1928) Treasurer of Illinois, founder and president of NorthWestern Trust & Savings Bank, the first Polish bank in the United States
- Stanley Henry Kunz (1864–1946) US Congressman
- Miecislaus Haiman (1888–1949) Polish-American historian, first Curator of the Polish Museum of America
- William Walter Link (1884–1950) US Congressman
- Leo Paul Kocialkowski (1882–1958) US Congressman
- Thomas S. Gordon (1893–1959) US Congressman
- William Lelivelt (1884–1968) Major League Baseball pitcher
- Fredrak Fraske (1872–1973) Last surviving veteran of the Indian Wars
- George Halas (1895–1983) Owner, founder, coach of the Chicago Bears
- Stanisław Błaszczak (1901–1983) Lieutenant colonel of the Polish Army, Warsaw Uprising insurgent
- Chester A. Chesney (1916–1986) US Congressman
- Victims of the 1995 Chicago heat wave (1995)
- Dan Rostenkowski (1928–2010) US Congressman
- Steven F. Kordek (1911–2012) pinball game designer
