= National Memorial Cemetery of Arizona =

United States National Cemetery

Coordinates: 33°41′45″N 112°01′07″W

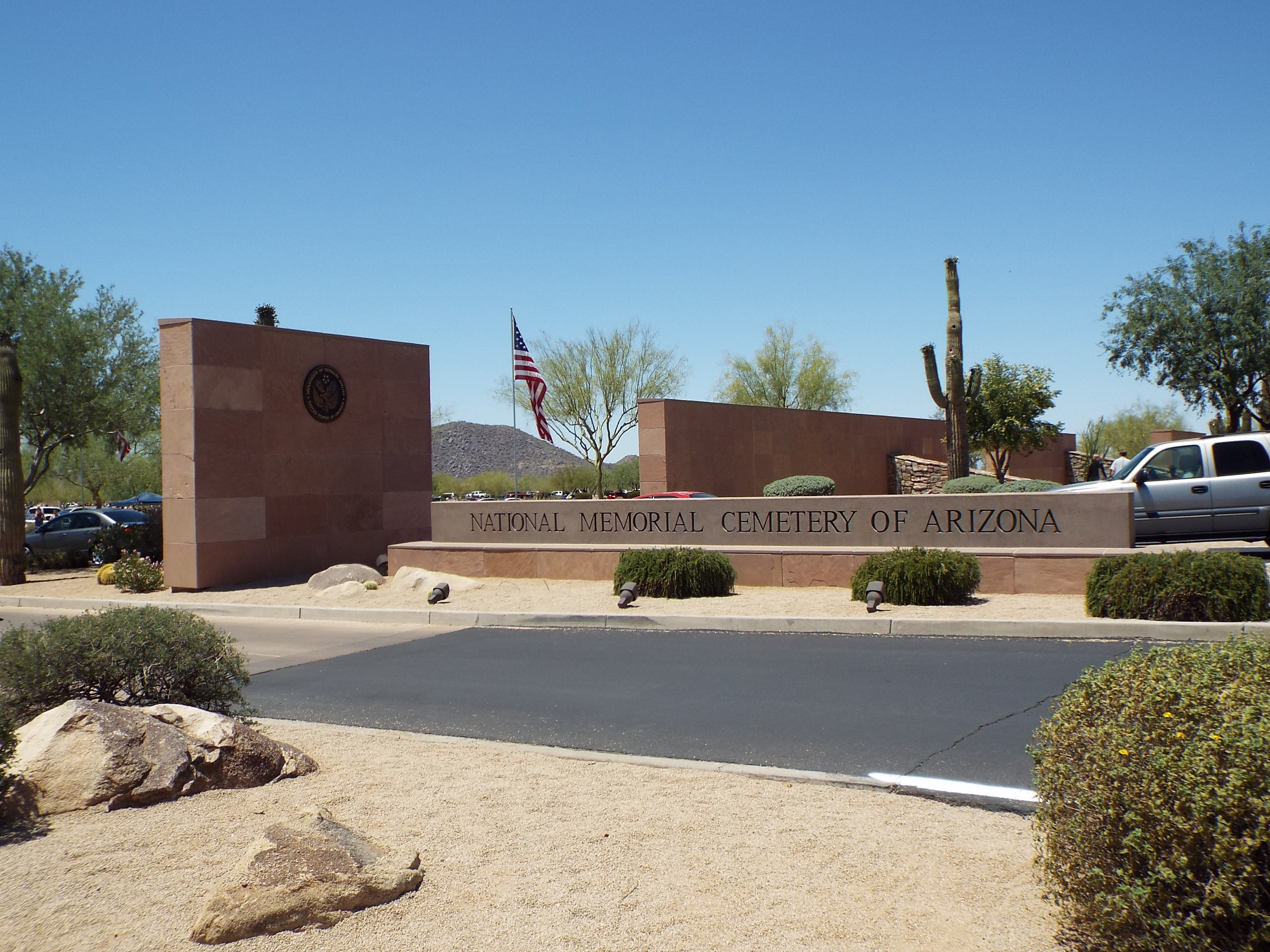
Entrance of the National Memorial Cemetery of Arizona.

National Memorial Cemetery of Arizona, also known as Arizona Veterans Memorial Cemetery, is a United States National Cemetery located in the city of Phoenix in Maricopa County, Arizona. It encompasses 225 acres (91 ha), and as of the end of 2016, had over 78,000 interments. It is one of two national cemeteries in Arizona (the other is Prescott National Cemetery).

== History ==
A state law passed in 1976, by then-Governor Raul Hector Castro, authorized the establishment of a large veterans' cemetery. The location in Phoenix was chosen and the cemetery was dedicated on December 9, 1978. The first interment took place the following spring. It was officially transferred to the control of the United States Department of Veterans Affairs and became a National Cemetery in 1989. In 1999, over 13 million dollars was spent on improving the facilities and developing the area with the intent of serving the burial needs of veterans until the year 2030.

== Notable monuments ==
- Eternal Flame monument (shaped like a pyramid)
- World War II Submarine Torpedo Monument
- The Vietnam Veterans Memorial [Field Cross Memorial]

== Notable interments ==
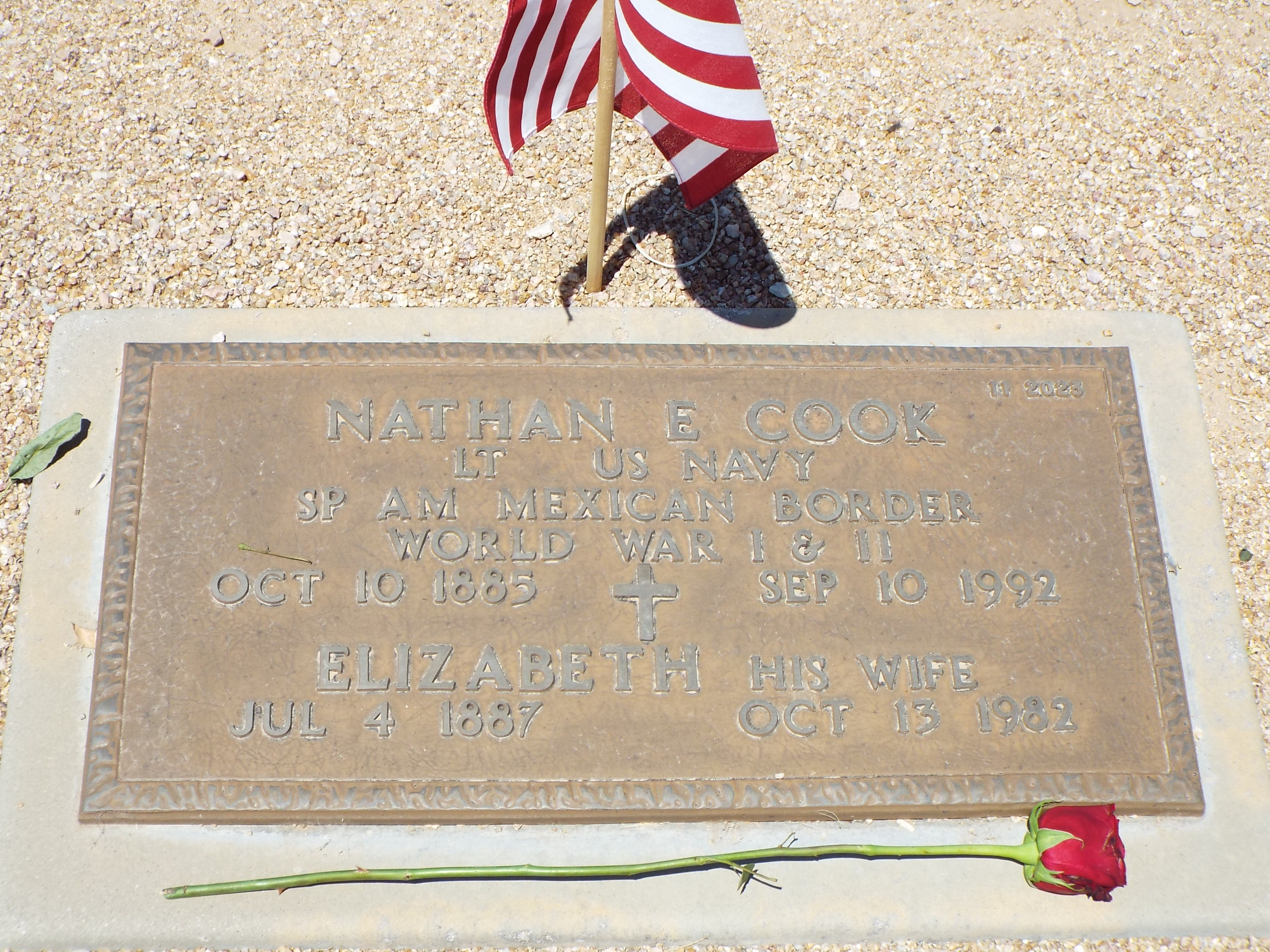
Grave site of Nathan Edward Cook.

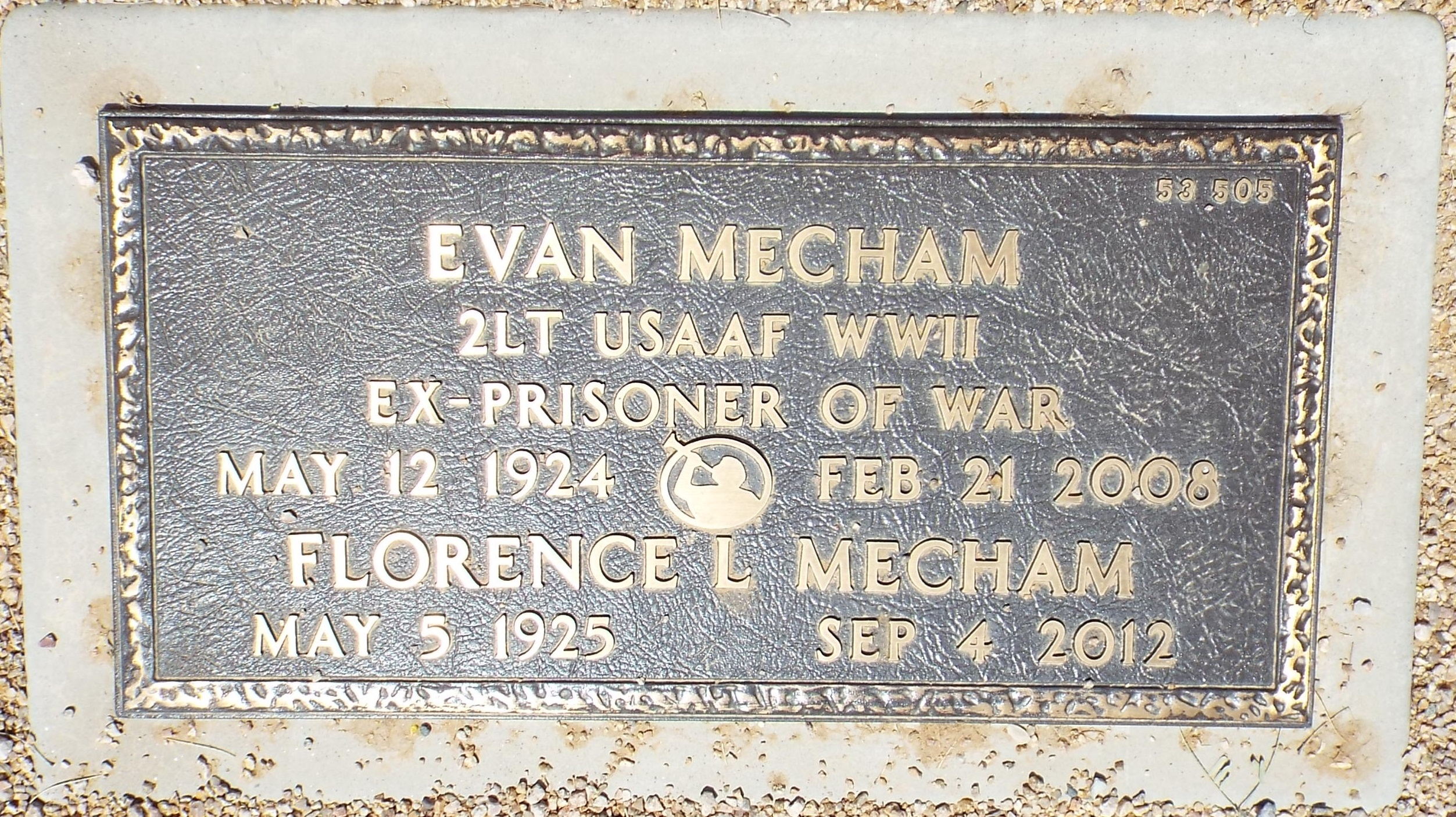
Grave site of Evan Mecham (1924–2008) and Florence Mecham (1925–2012).

- Lee Aaker, actor
- Thomas Bonner, president of Union College and Wayne State University, author
- Nathan E. Cook, the last surviving veteran of the Spanish–American War, died at the age of 106
- Morris Courtright, Arizona state legislator
- Doyle "Porky" Lade, major league baseball player, for the Chicago Cubs
- Evan Mecham, former governor of Arizona
- Donnie Owens, singer, guitarist and music producer
- Henry Polic II, Vietnam War U.S. Army veteran and actor
- Eldon Rudd, former member of the United States House of Representatives from Arizona

== See also ==
- Camp Navajo – site of another veterans' cemetery
