= Prescott National Cemetery =

Veterans cemetery in Yavapai County, Arizona

Coordinates: 34°32′49″N 112°26′51″W

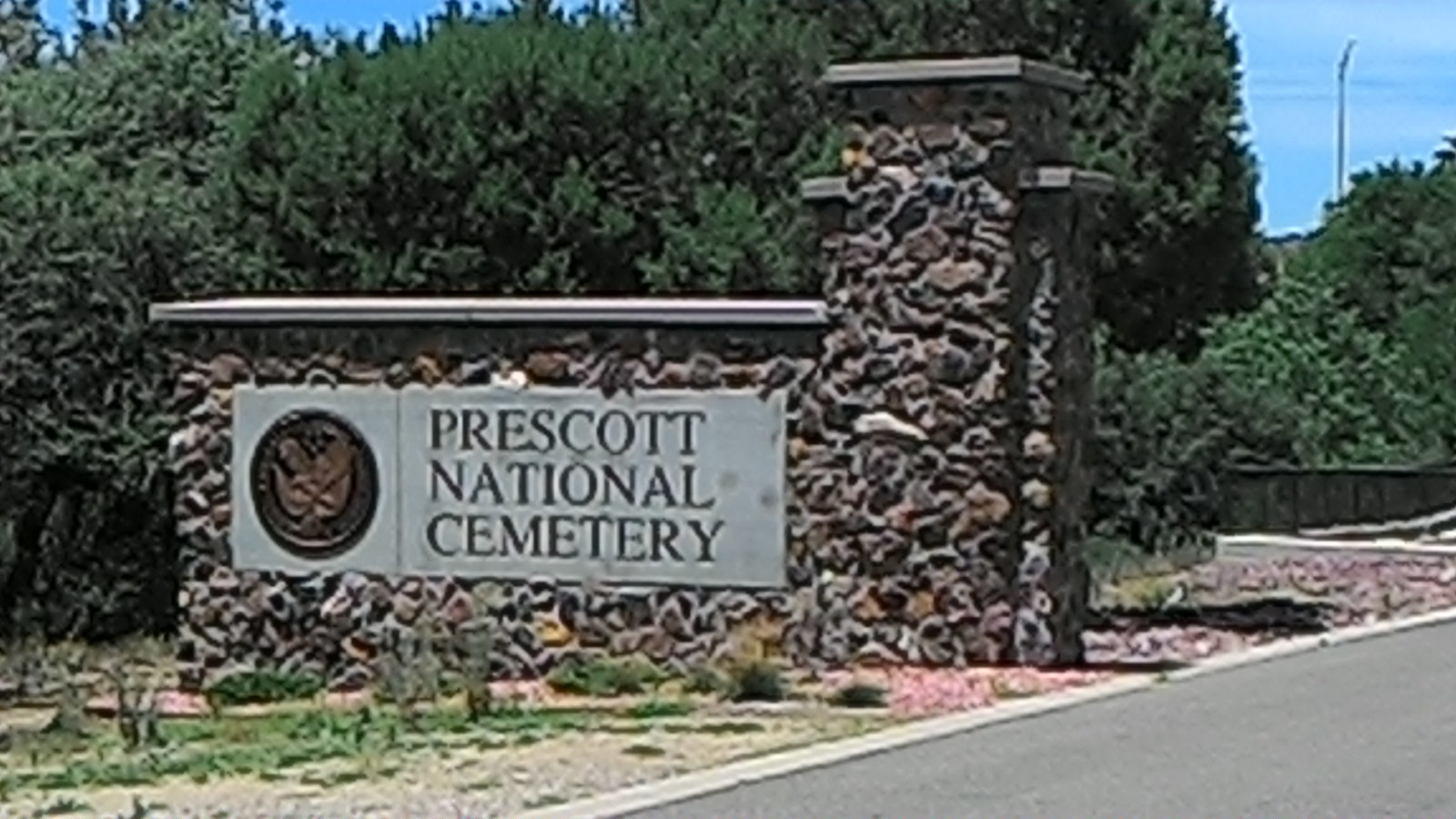

Details
- Established: 1869
- Location: Prescott, Arizona
- Country: United States
- Type: United States National Cemetery
- Size: 15.4 acres (6.2 ha)
- No. of interments: >7,500
- Find a Grave: Prescott National Cemetery

Prescott National Cemetery is a United States National Cemetery located in the city of Prescott, in Yavapai County, Arizona. Administered by the United States Department of Veterans Affairs, it encompasses 15.4 acres (6.2 ha), and has over 7,500 interments. Beginning in 2020 its new columbaria is accepting new inurnments. It is one of two national cemeteries in Arizona (the other being National Memorial Cemetery of Arizona).

== History ==
The cemetery was originally established near Fort Whipple in 1864, but was moved to its present location in 1869 after flash flooding washed out many of the grave sites. The majority of gravesites here span from the American Indian Wars to the Vietnam War.

Prescott National Cemetery was placed on the National Register of Historic Places in 1999.

== Notable monuments ==
- Unknown Soldiers Monument, made of white marble blocks with a cross on top.

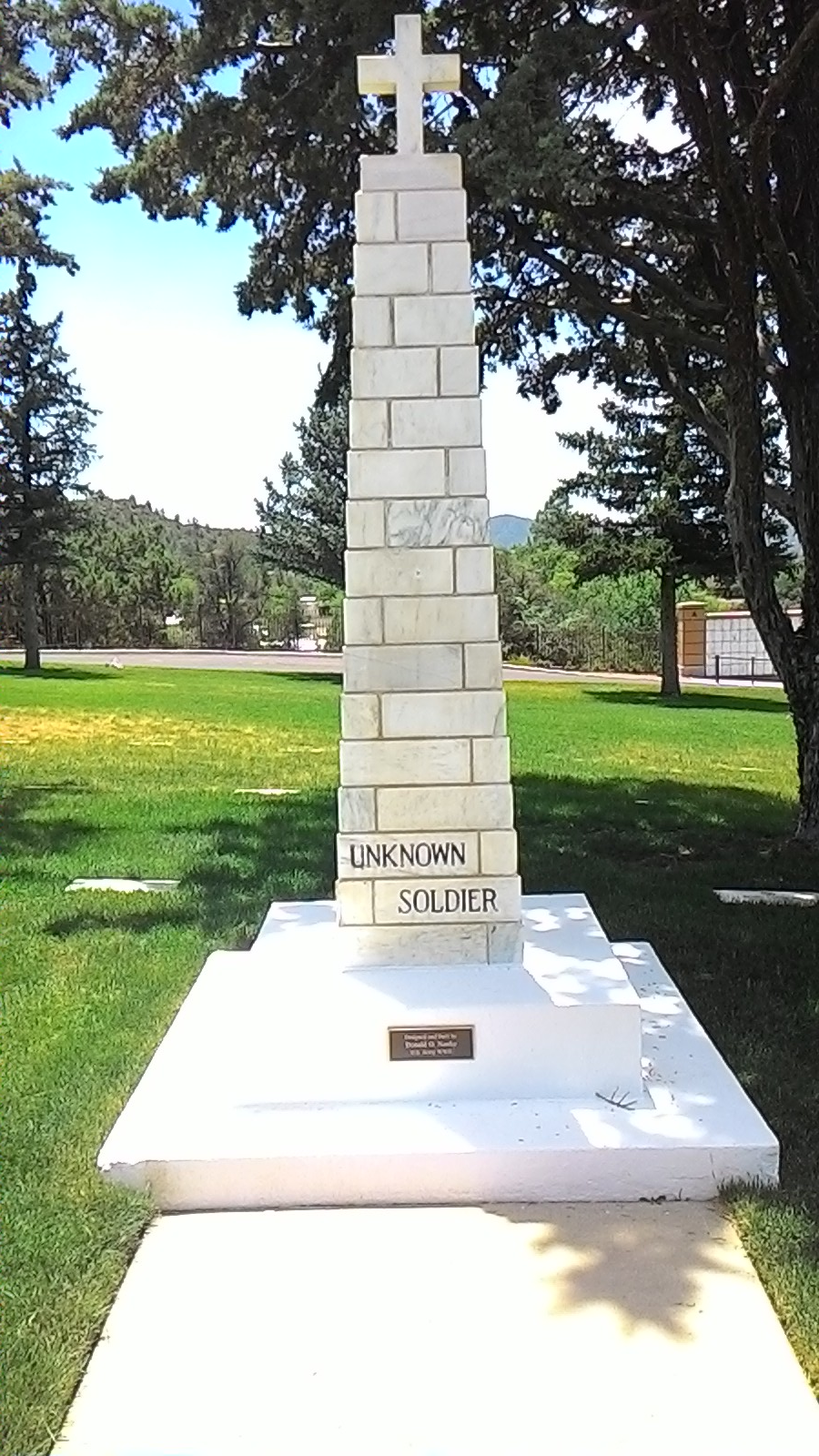
Unknown Soldier Monument

== Notable interments ==
- Medal of Honor recipients
  - Nicholas Foran (1844–1927), recipient for action in Arizona Territory during the Indian Wars
- Others
  - Jim Russell Pike (1936–2019), vocalist with The Lettermen
  - Rufus Danforth (1888–1920), served as Sapper Rufus Davis, World War I soldier of British Royal Engineers, only Commonwealth war grave in the cemetery.

== Gallery ==
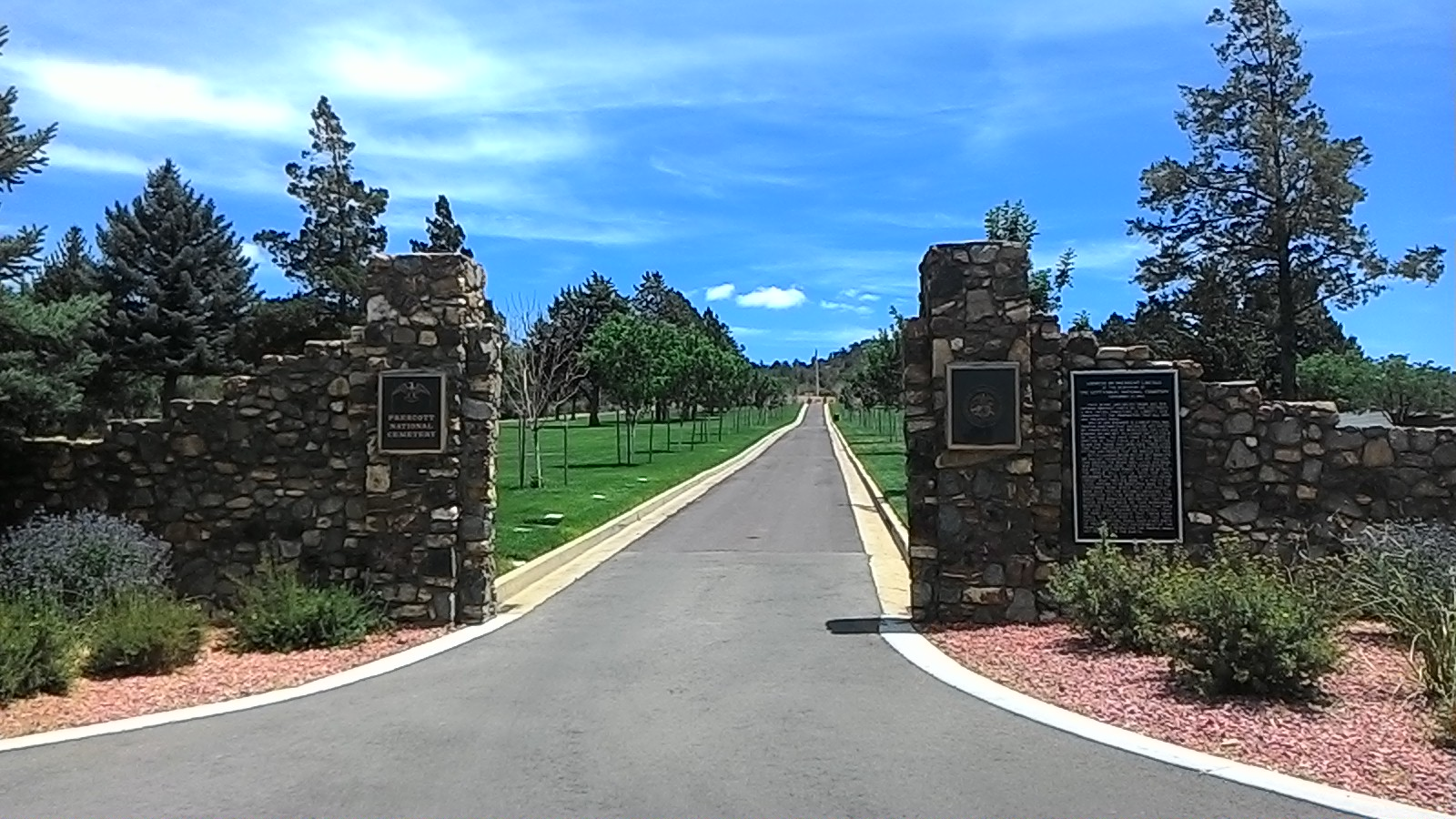
Entrance

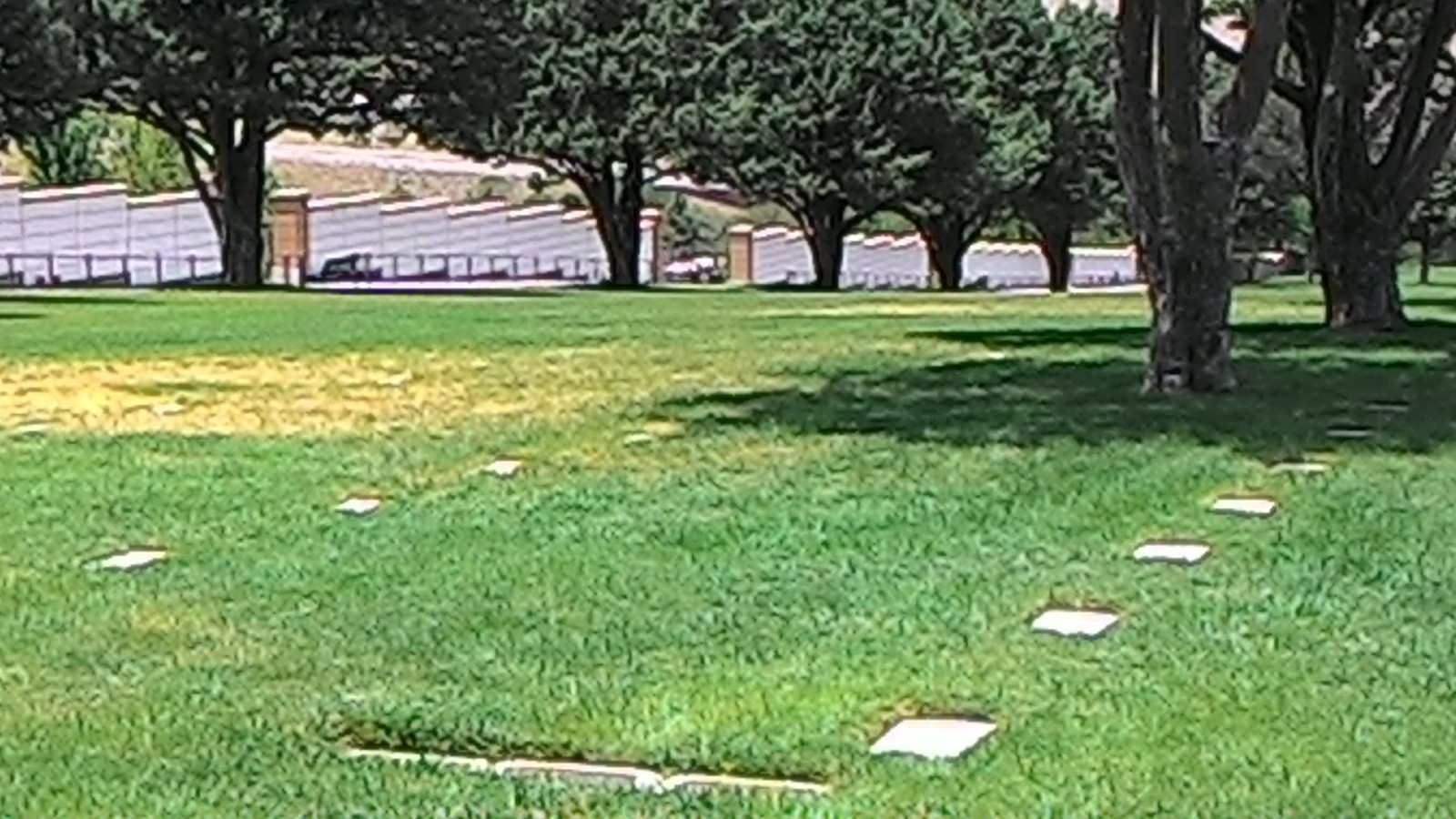
Prescott National Cemetery

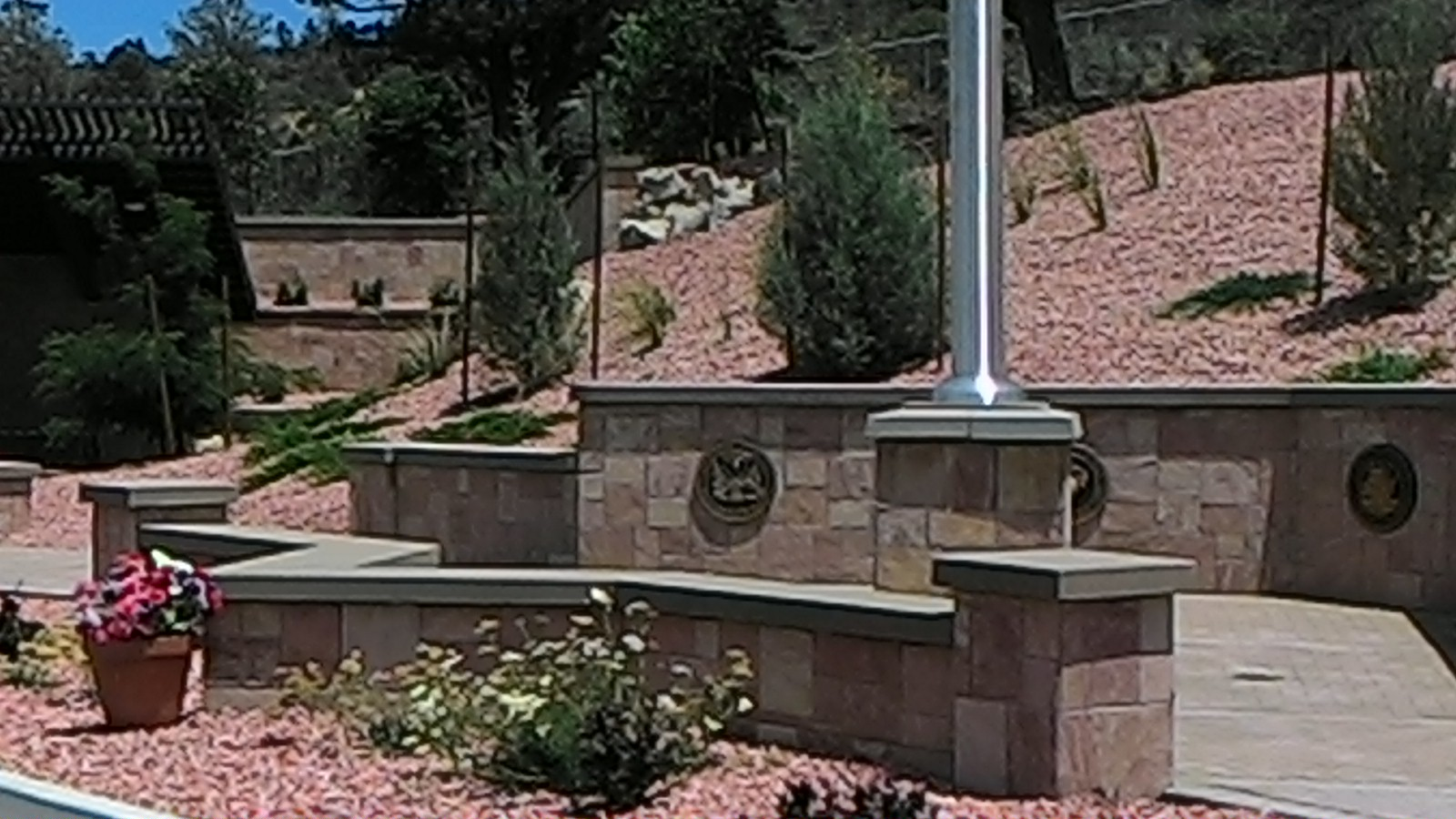
Flagpole
