= Nicholas Foran =

US Army Indian Wars Medal of Honor recipient (1844–1927)

- Born: June 3, 1844; County Waterford, Ireland
- Died: September 29, 1927 (aged 83); Prescott, Arizona, United States
- Burial place: Prescott National Cemetery
- Military career
- Allegiance: United States of America
- Branch: United States Army
- Service years: 1867–1872
- Rank: Sergeant
- Unit: 8th U.S. Cavalry
- Conflicts: Indian Wars; Apache Wars
- Awards: Medal of Honor

Sergeant Nicholas Samuel "Sam" Foran (June 3, 1844 – September 29, 1927) was an American soldier in the U.S. Army who served with the 8th U.S. Cavalry during the Apache Wars. He was one of thirty-four men who received the Medal of Honor for gallantry in several engagements against the Apache Indians in the Arizona Territory from August to October 1868.

== Biography ==
Nicholas Foran was born in County Waterford, Ireland on June 3, 1844. He later emigrated to the United States and enlisted in the U.S. Army in St. Louis, Missouri in 1867. Assigned to frontier duty with the 8th U.S. Cavalry, Foran participated in the Apache Wars in the late-1860s. In the late summer and fall of 1868, Foran was part of a small cavalry detachment ordered to secure settlements and protect the Arizona Territory from Apache raiding parties. From August to October, a group of 50–60 cavalry troopers from Companies B and L frequently fought the Apache during their patrols. Cavalrymen such as Foran experienced ambushes and sniper attacks from hidden ravines. After the campaign's end, he and thirty-four other men received the Medal of Honor for "bravery in scouts and actions against Indians". The award presentation, held on July 24, 1869, was one of the largest held at the time.

Foran was later posted to Fort Whipple in Prescott, Arizona. In 1872, he was finally discharged from Fort Union, New Mexico at the rank of sergeant. Returning to Arizona, he worked the mines in the McCabe district for 35 years before permanently settling in Prescott. His home at 144 North Granite Street, which no longer exists, was opened to the poor and said to be a "haven for all". Foran died in Prescott on September 29, 1927, at the age of 83. He was interred at Prescott National Cemetery. His a biography of his life, in which he was praised as a "typical trail blazer and a Western pioneer", was published in the Evening Courier three days after his death.

On May 27, 1984, a new headstone officially recognizing Foran as an MOH recipient was placed at his gravesite. Although a special government project had started marking gravesites in 1976, it took nearly 8 years before Foran was confirmed as an award recipient in the fall of 1983 by the Medal of Honor Historical Society in Alexandria, Virginia.

== Medal of Honor citation ==
Rank and organization: Private, Company L, 8th U.S. Cavalry. Place and date: Arizona, August to October 1868. Entered service at:------. Birth: Ireland. Date of issue: July 24, 1869.

Citation:

Bravery in scouts and actions against Indians.

== See also ==
- List of Medal of Honor recipients for the Indian Wars
