= List of last surviving Brazilian war veterans =

This is an incomplete list of the last surviving veterans of Brazilian wars. The last surviving veteran of any particular war, upon his death, marks the end of a historic era. Exactly who is the last surviving veteran is often an issue of contention, especially with records from long-ago wars. The "last man standing" was often very young at the time of enlistment and in many cases had lied about his age to gain entry into the service, which confuses matters further. There were also sometimes incentives for men to lie about their ages after their military service ended.

== 18th century ==
=== Inconfidência Mineira (1789) ===
- Padre Manuel Rodrigues da Costa (1754–1844) – Inconfidentes. Also participated in the Independence of Brazil and in the Liberal Rebellions of 1842.
- José de Resende Costa (1766–1841) – Inconfidentes.

== 19th century ==
=== Brazilian War of Independence (1822–25) ===
- Joaquim Marques Lisboa, future Marquis of Tamandaré (1807–1897) – Imperial Brazilian Navy. Volunteer cabin boy on the frigate Niterói. Last known combatant.

=== Ragamuffin War (1835–45) ===
- Manuel Lucas de Oliveira Filho (1795–1874) – Riograndense Republic. Last Ragamuffin Army Brazilian-born commander.
- Giuseppe Garibaldi (1807–1882) – Riograndense Republic. Last Ragamuffin Army commander.
- Anísio Manoel de Souza (1822(18?)– Feb 28, 1938) – Riograndense Republic. Later served in the Paraguayan War. Oldest soldier in Brazilian Army's history.

=== Paraguayan War (1864–70) ===
- Prince Gaston of Orleans, Count of Eu (1842–1922) – Last commander of the Triple Alliance army.
- Manuel do Nascimento Vargas (1844–1943) – Corporal Volunteer of the 28th Provisional Cavalry Corps of the National Guard.. Later served in the Federalist Revolution. Father of president Getúlio Vargas.
- Pedro Hahn (1850–1949) – Brazilian Army. Last German-Brazilian veteran.
- Pedro Guedes do Amaral (1846–1954) – Brazilian Army. Later served in the Federalist Revolution and in the War of Canudos.
- Major Luiz Hilário Pereira Garro (1851–1958) – Brazilian Army. Later served in the War of Canudos.

=== Proclamation of the Brazilian Republic (1889) ===
==== Aggrieved monarchists. ====
- Pedro II of Brazil (1825–1891) – Last Brazilian Emperor.
- Cândido Luís Maria de Oliveira (1845–1919) – Minister of Justice at the time of the Coup. Last living Minister of the Empire.
- Prince Ludwig Gaston of Saxe-Coburg and Gotha (1870–1942) – Grandson of the Emperor. Last living member of the Brazilian Imperial Family at the time of the Coup.
- José da Costa Azevedo, Baron of Ladário (1825–1904) – Last physically injured during the Coup.
- João Alfredo Correia de Oliveira (1835–1919) – Last living Prime Minister of the Empire of Brazil.
- Isabel Maria de Alcântara, Duchess of Goiás (1824–1898) – Last Duchess of the Empire of Brazil.
- Luís Alves de Lima e Silva, Duke of Caxias (1803–1880) – Last Duke of the Empire of Brazil.
- João Lustosa da Cunha Paranaguá, Marquis of Paranaguá (1821–1912) – Last Marquis of the Empire of Brazil.
- Joaquim José Moreira Lima, Count of Moreira Lima (1842–1926) – Last Count of the Empire of Brazil.
- Luís Otávio de Oliveira Roxo, Viscount of Vargem Alegre (1850–1937) – Last Viscount of the Empire of Brazil.
- Alfredo da Rocha Faria, Baron of Nioaque (1859–1942) – Last known baron of the Empire of Brazil.

==== Republican coup nucleus. ====
- Eduardo Wandenkolk (1838–1902) – Brazilian Rear-Admiral. Last military leader of the Coup.
- Ruy Barbosa (1849–1923) – Last civilian leader of the Coup.
- Cândido Rondon (1865–1958) – Military, second lieutenant at the time. Future Marshal.

=== War of Canudos (1896–97) ===
- José Ciríaco (?–1974) – Canudos inhabitants.
- Honório Vila Nova (1864–1969) – Canudos inhabitants. Later served in the Revolt of Juazeiro.
- Antonio de Isabel (1894?–2005) – Canudos inhabitants. Child or baby who lived in Canudos, being the last survivor.

== 20th century ==
=== Revolt of the Lash (1910) ===
- João Cândido (1880–1969) – Leader and last known rebel. Also served in the Federalist Revolution.

=== Contestado War (1912–16) ===
- Firmino Rodrigues Martim (1894–c.2000) – Brazilian Army (vaqueanos).
- Sebastiana da Silva Medeiros (1908–2013) – Child survivor of the crimes of beheading.
- Altino Bueno da Silva (1903–2014) – Last rebellious child and witness of the slaughter.

=== World War I (1914–18) ===
- José Pessoa (1885–1959) – Brazilian Army. Last officer.
- Maximiano José dos Santos (1893–2006) – Brazilian Navy. Last veteran in Naval Division in War Operations.
- Waldemar Levy Cardoso (1900–2009) – Brazilian Army. Also participated in the São Paulo Revolt of 1924, the Revolution of 1930, the Constitutionalist Revolution of 1932, World War II and the 1964 Brazilian coup d'état. Last Brazilian Field Marshal.

=== Tenentist campaigns (1922–30) ===
Legalists.

- Brasílio Taborda (1877–1973). Major.
- Edgar de Góis Monteiro (1901–1973). Lieutenant of the Brazilian Army.
- Eurico Gaspar Dutra (1883–1974). Lieutenant Colonel.
- Salvador César Obino (1886–1979). Major.
- Ademar de Queirós (1899–1984). Captain.
- Augusto Rademaker (1905–1985). Lieutenant of the Brazilian Navy.
- Gabriel Grün Moss (1904–1989). Lieutenant of the Brazilian Navy.
- Ângelo Mendes de Moraes (1894–1990). Major.
- Ismar de Góis Monteiro (1906–1990). Lieutenant of the Brazilian Army.
- Olímpio Martins Pires (1910–2020). Brazilian Army Soldier.

Rebel Lieutenants.

- Eduardo Gomes (1896–1981).
- Osvaldo Cordeiro de Farias (1901–1981).
- Henrique Teixeira Lott (1894–1984).
- Odylio Denys (1892–1985).
- Nélson de Melo (1899–1989).
- Luís Carlos Prestes (1898–1990).
- Waldemar Levy Cardoso (1900–2009).

Rebel Soldiers.

- Gregório Bezerra (1900–1983).
- Augusto Amaral Peixoto (1901–1984).
- Altino Gomes da Silva (1904–1996).

Rebel Aspirants.

- Waldetrudes do Amarante Brandão (1903–1980).
- Siseno Sarmento (1907–1983).
- Emílio Médici (1905–1985).
- Ernâni do Amaral Peixoto (1904–1989).
- Márcio de Sousa Melo (1906–1991).
- Amaury Kruel (1901–1996).
- Ernesto Geisel (1907–1996).
- Jurandir de Bizzaria Mamede (1906–1998).
- Casimiro Montenegro Filho (1904–2000).
- Antonio Carlos Muricy (1906–2000).
- Juracy Magalhães (1905–2001).

Rebel Civilians.

- Pedro Aleixo (1901–1975).
- José Américo de Almeida (1887–1980).
- Themístocles Cavalcanti (1899–1980).

=== 18 of the Copacabana Fort revolt (1922) ===
- Altino Gomes da Silva (1904–1996) – Tenentistas.

=== São Paulo Revolt of 1924 ===
- Eduardo Gomes (1896–1981) – Tenentistas. Last of the lieutenant leaders. Also a veteran of the Constitutionalist Revolution of 1932.
- Waldemar Levy Cardoso (1900–2009) – Tenentistas. Also a veteran of the World War I, the Revolution of 1930, the Constitutionalist Revolution of 1932, the World War II and the 1964 Brazilian coup d'état. Last Brazilian Field Marshal.
- Hercules Caetano Castagna (1918–2011) – Last witness of Mooca.

=== Revolution of 1930 ===
- Olimpio Martins Pires (1910–2020) – New State. Served as an MP in Minas Gerais. Also participated in the Revolution of 1932.

=== Constitutionalist Revolution (1932) ===
- Brasílio Taborda (1877–1973) – São Paulo. Last commander of the Constitutionalist Army.
- Ivo Borges (1890–1980) – São Paulo. Last commander of the Constitutionalist Air Force.
- Eduardo Gomes (1896–1981) – Brazil. Air major at the time. Last commander of the Federal Force.
- José Luiz Silveira (1909–c. 2011) – Brazil. Served in the BMRS. Last Battle of Cerro Alegre combattant. Also participated in the Revolution of 1923 and in the Revolution of 1930.
- Osvaldo Rafael Santiago (1915–2013) – São Paulo. Last Itapetininga rebel combattant.
- Natalino Antonio Augusto (1910–2014) – São Paulo. Last Campinas rebel combattant.
- José Mango (1913–2015) – São Paulo. Last rebel veteran of the Battle of Gravi.
- Zuleika Sucupira Kenworthy (1912–2017) – São Paulo. Last Jundiaí rebel combattant.
- Irany Paraná do Brasil (1913–2017) – São Paulo. Last male São Paulo rebel combattant. Author "1932 - A Guerra de São Paulo".
- Agenor Silva Lima (1912–c. 2018) – São Paulo. Last Ipiranga rebel combattant.
- Arlindo Leonardo Ribeiro (1913–2019) – São Paulo. Last Barretos rebel combattant and last male combattant.
- Maria de Lourdes Pinto Picarelli (1913–2019) – São Paulo. Last rebel combattant.
- Olimpio Martins Pires (1910–2020) – Brazil. Served in the PMMG. Also participated in the Revolution of 1930.
- Alfredo Pires Filho (1920–2021) – São Paulo. Last rebel Boy Scout messenger. Later trained the Brazilian pilots during the World War II.

=== Communist uprising of 1935 ===
- Antero de Almeida (1906–2014) – National Liberation Alliance.

=== World War II (1939–45) ===
- Oswaldo Cordeiro de Farias (1901–1981) – Brazilian Expeditionary Force Divisional Artillery Commander. Last FEB general.
- Ibá Jobim Meirelles (1903–1984) – Brazilian Expeditionary Force Lieutenant colonel. Last FEB commander.
- José Albino (1916–1989) – Brazilian Army. Soldier of the 5th Battalion of Hunters. Coastal Surveillance and Defense in Santos.
- Nero Moura (1910–1994) – 1st Brazilian Fighter Squadron General Commander. Last commander of the air forces in war.
- Pierre Henri Clostermann (1921–2006) – Royal Air Force. French-Brazilian. Only Brazilian-born to participate in D-Day.
- José Carlos de Miranda Corrêa (1920–2013) – Brazilian Air Force. Last Brazilian Air Force pilot.
- José Salvador de Quevedo (1921–2014?) – Brazilian Expeditionary Force. Last Terena combattant.
- John William Buyers (1920–2016) – Brazilian Air Force. Last Brazilian Air Force combattant.
- Adolfo José Klock (1922–2018) – Brazilian Expeditionary Force. Last Blumenau combattant.
- Otacílio Teiceira (1921–2019) – Brazilian Expeditionary Force. Black and Terena indigenous parents. Last Terena descendant.
- Geraldo Perdigão (1922–2020) – Brazilian Expeditionary Force. Last member of the 1st Esquadrilha de Ligação e Observação (Liaison and Observation Squadron; mixed Army and Air Force unit).
- Justino Alfredo (1920–2021) – Brazilian Expeditionary Force. Last Campinas combattant.
- Carlos Henrique Bessa (1920–2022) – Brazilian Expeditionary Force. 2nd Lieutenant Physician. Last FEB doctor.
- Orlando Pires (1919–2022) – Brazilian Expeditionary Force. Last Araraquara combattant.
- Victorio Nalesso (1922–2022) – Brazilian Expeditionary Force. 11th Infantry Regiment (Tiradentes). Penultimate Itapetininga combattant.
- Argemiro de Toledo Filho (1925–2022) – Brazilian Expeditionary Force. 1st Infantry Regiment (Sampaio). Last Itapetininga combattant.
- Sebastião Paulino de Lima (1919–2022) – Brazilian Expeditionary Force. Taurepang indigenous. Last veteran of the state of Roraima.
- João Caetano da Silva (1924 –2022) – Brazilian Expeditionary Force. Last veteran of the state of Rondônia.
- Anselmo Alves (1922–2022) – Brazilian Expeditionary Force. Last veteran in the state of Maranhão.
- Luiz Cardoso Ferreira (?–2022) – Brazilian Expeditionary Force. Last veteran in the state of Piauí.
- Andor Stern (1928–2022) – Holocaust survivor. Only Brazilian-born Holocaust survivor.
- Virgínia Maria de Niemeyer Portocarrero (1917–2023) – Brazilian Expeditionary Force. Last FEB nurse.
- João Lício Júnior (1921–2023) – Brazilian Expeditionary Force. Last FEB interpreter.
- Edson Corrêa dos Santos (1920–2023) – Brazilian Expeditionary Force. Last of the 148 combatants born in state of Alagoas.
- Joatan Conegundes de Araújo (1922–2023) – Brazilian Expeditionary Force. Last veteran in the state of Acre.
- José Etelvino dos Santos (1919–2024) – Brazilian Expeditionary Force. Last veteran resident in the state of Goiás.
- Mário Expedito Neves Guerreiro (1920–2024) – Brazilian Expeditionary Force. Last veteran in the state of Amazonas.
- José Pedro Pinheiro (1923–2024) – Brazilian Expeditionary Force. Last veteran in the state of Bahia.
- Orlando Donadio (1920–2024) – Brazilian Expeditionary Force. Last FEB watcher.
- José Bernardino Coelho (1921–2024) – Brazilian Expeditionary Force. Last FEB stretcher bearer.
- Walter Carlos Hertel (1922–2024) – Brazilian Expeditionary Force. Last veteran from Jaraguá do Sul.
- Elmo Diniz (1922–2025) – Brazilian Expeditionary Force. Last living FEB 2nd Sergeant.
- Oscar de Abreu Paiva (1923–1925) – Brazilian Expeditionary Force. Graduated from the Military School of Realengo (class of November 1944), he embarked for Italy a week after being declared an Aspirant. Appointed as the last FEB veteran graduated from EMR. Retired as Colonel.
- Mário Marques de Macedo (1925–2026) – Brazilian Expeditionary Force. Last veteran in the state of Mato Grosso.
- Nestor da Silva (1917–2026) – Brazilian Expeditionary Force. Last living FEB Lieutenant. Promoted from 2nd Sergeant to 2nd Lieutenant during the Battle of Montese, for bravery. Appointed as the last veteran living in the Federal District and the last of the approximately 643 awarded the 1st Class Combat Cross still alive.
- Justino Pires de Arruda (1919–living) – Brazilian Expeditionary Force. Wounded in combat (hit in the head by shrapnel from a grenade), he received the Blood of Brazil Medal. Appointed as the last living veteran among the 649 natives of the region that today comprises the state of Mato Grosso do Sul, and the last veteran resident in the state.
- Hugo Pedro Felisbino (1919–living) – Brazilian Expeditionary Force. Last FEB male nurse. Last veteran in the state of Santa Catarina.
- João Carlos de Lima (1922–living) – Brazilian Expeditionary Force. Last veteran in the state of Rio Grande do Norte.
- Geraldo Rodrigues de Oliveira (1922–living) – Brazilian Expeditionary Force. Last veteran born in the state of Ceará.
- José Cícero de Araújo (1923–living) – Brazilian Expeditionary Force. Last veteran in the state of Paraíba.
- Agostinho Ferreira da Silva (1923–living) – Brazilian Expeditionary Force. Last veteran in the state of Espírito Santo.
- José Santana Baltazar (1924–living) – Brazilian Expeditionary Force. Last veteran in the state of Pará.
- Joaquim Ignacio Goulart Mayer (1925–living) – Brazilian Expeditionary Force. Youngest FEB combat veteran still alive. Last veteran in the state of Paraná.
- José Osório de Oliveira Filho (1923–living) – Coastal Surveillance and Defense.
- Sano Toshiyuki (1940–living) – Hibakusha (survivor of atomic bombing, in Hiroshima) living in Brazil.

At present, there is still more than one veteran of the Brazilian Expeditionary Force living in their respective Brazilian states.

- Minas Gerais (3), Pernambuco (2), Rio de Janeiro (2), Rio Grande do Sul (2), São Paulo (2).

There are also ~ 55 living veterans who were in charge of Brazil's Coastal Surveillance and Defense.

== See also ==
- Military history of Brazil
- List of last surviving veterans of military insurgencies and wars
- List of last surviving veterans of military operations
- Last European veterans by war
- Last surviving United States war veterans
- List of last surviving Canadian war veterans
