= John Daw =

U.S. Army Navajo Scout (1870–1965)

- Born: Hastiintsoh; 1870; Navajo Nation
- Died: 1965 (aged 94–95); Coconino County, Arizona, U.S.
- Burial place: Red Lake, Coconino County, Arizona
- Military career
- Allegiance: United States
- Branch: United States Army
- Service years: 1891–1894
- Rank: Private
- Unit: 2nd U.S. Cavalry
- Conflicts: American Indian Wars

John Daw (1870–1965), also known by his Navajo name Hastiintsoh, was a Navajo Scout who served in the United States Army during the American Indian Wars. He enlisted in the Army on May 7, 1891, and served with the 2nd U.S. Cavalry at Fort Wingate in the New Mexico Territory until December 5, 1894.

Daw worked as a tracker, including tracking Apache people, during his military service. In his later years, he lived with his wife at the Red Lake Trading Post near Tonalea, Arizona, on Navajo Nation land, where he worked as a sheep herder. He died in 1965 and was buried at Red Lake in Coconino County, Arizona. His grave is listed as a historic grave site, and John Daw Mesa was named after him.

== See also ==
- Last surviving United States war veterans
- Frederick Fraske
