= Grand Prix (pinball) =

1976 pinball machines

- Manufacturer: Williams
- Release date: December 1976
- System: Electro-mechanical
- Design: Steve Kordek
- Artwork: Christian Marche
- Production run: 10,554

Grand Prix is a pinball machine released by Williams in December 1976 after a sample run in June 1976. It is among the last electro-mechanical (EM) pinball machines produced by Williams, with all production lines converted to solid state by December 1977. It is the also the second machine used by Williams to create a small run of prototypes of solid state machines.

== Design ==
Similar to other games produced in 1976, the machine uses AC, with a bridge rectifier used to convert this to DC for powering the slingshots and pop bumpers. These bumpers are more powerful than versions used in earlier machines using AC, and are sometimes called thumper bumpers.

Although the sample run of 218 units began production on June 30, 1976 the main production run only began on December 15, 1976.

The game has settings in the backbox to adjust the hi-score value; another setting sets the award for achieving this score or collecting a special to a free credit, or an extra ball. Another difficulty setting is used for lighting the special on either the third or fourth star.

=== Artwork ===
The backglass shows a scene inspired by the marina area of the Monaco Grand Prix. The cabinet uses stencil art, with three stylized racing cars on either side of the cabinet, and another on either side of the backbox. Most of the playfield uses simple colors with various insert lights, with additional themed artwork on the playfield plastics.

== Layout ==
Other than the plunger lane, this is a symmetrical game. The plunger lane leads to the top of the playfield where a saucer (eject hole) is located. Below this are two thumper bumpers with two drop targets labelled "A" and "B". Below these is a diamond shape with two further drop targets on the lower sides labelled "C" and "D". On either side of the playfield is a lane containing a spinner which leads to the top of the playfield; just below the entrance to these lanes is a saucer near the side of the machine. The lower part of the playfield includes two inlanes and two outlanes, each with rollovers.

There are several posts which can be moved to change the difficulty of the game.

== Gameplay ==
The game is set to 3 or 5 ball play, and is controlled with a manual plunger and two flippers. Changing the number of balls changes some of the scoring and bonus features.

The top eject hole advances the bonus on both sides, and the spinners each advance the bonus on one side only. The left and right eject holes score the bonus lit on that side of the machine. When the ball drains the bonus is collected from the side indicated by a red arrow. Four stars in the middle of the playfield each multiply the bonus and can be lit be completing pairs of drop targets. An extra ball is lit in one inlane by completing two pairs of targets, and the special is lit by completing the third or fourth star.

The spinners are increased in value when the bonus on that side reaches the maximum 50,000.

== Reception ==
When put on test locations, feedback from players indicated this would be a successful game.

In a review for Play Meter Roger Sharpe rated the game 3.5/4. After calling 1976 the year of the spinner, the reviewer noted that skill from both flippers was needed to hit the games two spinners. The game was found to play fast, with action in the thumper bumpers where nudging was recommended. The use of color in the artwork produced by Ad Poster was appreciated.

Steve Kordek thought Grand Prix was a "great game".

== In popular culture ==
The machine features prominently in an early scene of F1: The Movie, when it is played by Brad Pitt as Sonny Hayes.

== Solid State version ==
Grand Prix (solid state)
- Manufacturer: Williams
- System: Williams system 1
- Design: Steve Kordek
- Artwork: Christian Marche
- Manufacturing date: May 1977
- Production run: 5

Following on from the solid state prototypes manufactured using Aztec pinball machines, five Grand Prix solid state prototypes were produced. This is the only machine to use the Williams system 1 electronics. The electronics of this system were designed by Ken Fedesna who started work at Williams on February 21, 1977. These prototypes were completed by May 30, 1977, less than 3.5 months after starting the project. The microprocessor replaced the relays used in the EM version of this machine. Only four of the prototypes were placed in test locations. The score reels used in the EM version were replaced with a numeric display. One of these prototypes was retained by Ken Fedesna.

The production lines at Williams fully converted to solid state by December 1977.

This version was referred to in witness testimony in a court case when Bally took legal action for patent infringement.
