= Frederick Fraske =

Last surviving veteran of the Indian Wars

Frederick W. Fraske
- Born: March 8, 1872; Posen, German Empire
- Died: June 18, 1973 (aged 101); Chicago, Illinois, U.S.
- Burial place: St. Adalbert Cemetery, Niles, Illinois
- Military career
- Allegiance: United States of America
- Branch: United States Army
- Service years: 1894-97
- Rank: Private
- Unit: 17th U. S. Infantry
- Conflicts: Indian Wars

Frederick (Fredrak) W. Fraske (March 8, 1872 – June 18, 1973) was a German-born American soldier, believed to have been the last surviving veteran of the Indian Wars.

== Biography ==
Fraske was an ethnic German born in the city of Posen, which at that time was in the Province of Posen, part of Prussia, which itself was part of the German Empire. As a young child in 1877, he migrated to the United States with his family, including his parents and four brothers. At the age of 21, on February 22, 1894, in Chicago, which was his home town, he enlisted in the U.S. Army to help his widowed mother support her family of seven. He was assigned to Fort D.A. Russell, which was near Cheyenne, Wyoming, serving as a private with company F of the 17th infantry as a first aid man and letter carrier. He spoke about Cheyenne of that time as a quiet but wild town, where cattle were unloaded, and the residents were a tough breed.

His starting pay in the Army was the standard $9 a month, and then it increased $1 each year. The time that he was in the service was spent preparing for confrontation at the fort, which never occurred. Fraske later said he was glad that he never fired a shot in battle with American Indians, and didn't feel any ill will towards them either. He also felt that he understood the difficult position they were in. Fraske never personally had anything other than peaceful encounters with them.

In that era, the Army allowed a soldier to be discharged after three years and three months of service instead of serving the full five years, if requested by a soldier with excellent character, and so Fraske took advantage of that law and left the Army in 1897, at the age of 25.

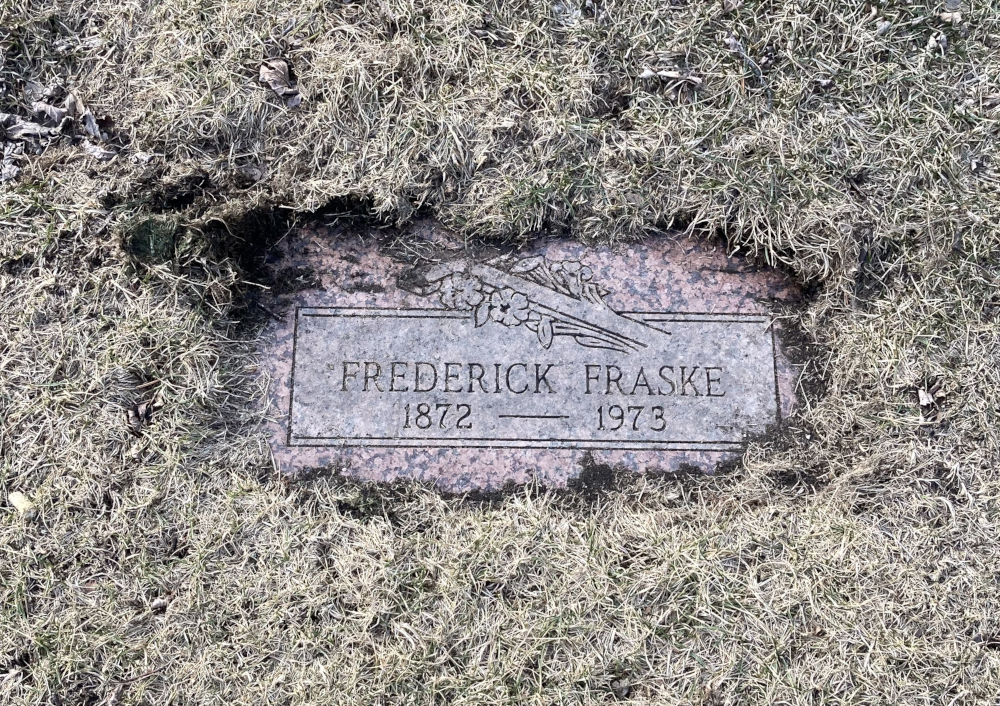
Fraske's grave at St. Adalbert Cemetery

After his service ended, he returned to Chicago and worked as a building painter for nearly 40 years, retiring because union work rules didn't allow anyone over age 65 to climb scaffolds. He continued working as a security guard for the Salerno-McGowan Biscuit company for the next 23 years, and then retired at age 88. At the time of his death at age 101, he was living with his daughter Lillian in Chicago, and was receiving part-time nursing assistance from the Veterans Administration. He was buried at St. Adalbert Cemetery in Niles, Illinois.

== See also ==
- Last surviving United States war veterans
- John Daw
