= Aztec (pinball) =

1976 pinball machines

- Manufacturer: Williams
- Release date: February 1976
- System: Electro-mechanical
- Design: Gordon Horlick
- Artwork: Christian Marche
- Production run: 10,150

Aztec is a pinball machine released by Williams in February 1976. It is also the first machine used by Williams to create a small run of prototypes of solid state machines.

== Design ==
The game has five moving score reels per player, with the sixth and final reel an unpowered reel which always stays on the digit "0", with every score in the game a multiple of 10. This final reel only has the "0" and parts of the "9" and "1" marked on it. All Williams games released in 1975 had the more typical four powered reels per player, but some other 1976 games also used five reels per players.

The game has 10, 100, 1,000, and 10,000 point relays which advance the scoring reels as targets are hit. Many elements of scoring are based on "5" due to the configuration of the score motor which includes five reels with stacked switches linked to scoring. There are several configurable scores that a replay credit can be awarded at, set by adjusting wires in the backbox.

At the start of each ball, the ball release coil kicks the ball from the outhole into the shooter lane ready for the player to plunge. The game is set to 3 or 5 ball play with a physical adjustment in the cabinet. The ball in play lights on the backbox are arranged as 1-4-2-5-3 so that players with only 3 balls don't feel their game has been cut short. If an extra ball has been earned then the ball in play number does not increment when a ball drains into the outhole.

The game includes three tilt mechanisms, a standard tilt bob, an incline tilt which is a channel with a ball in it to detect if the machine is lifted from the front, a third mechanism is on the underside of the playfield. Additionally there is an anti-slam tilt mechanism on the inside of the coin door to prevent banging on the coin door to trigger the leaf switch to obtain free credits.

The game includes three chimes located in the base of the cabinet.

Electro-mechanical version of Aztec

Similar to other games produced in 1976, the machine uses AC, with a bridge rectifier used to convert this to DC for powering the slingshots and pop bumpers. These bumpers are more powerful than versions used in earlier machines using AC, and are sometimes called thumper bumpers.

In an early job at Williams, future pinball designer Barry Oursler worked on the production of this game.

=== Artwork ===
The cabinet uses red and gold colored stencil art created by Ad Poster, with that on the side of the backbox based on an Aztec pyramid, and a stylized design on the cabinet with the head of a creature facing to the left and right.

The playfield features a large figure in front of the same pyramid which extends into the bumper area; a series of decorative plastics are mounted which give the game visual depth.

The backglass shows a scene using several figures, a waterway, and a temple. This seems to have been inspired by drawings by H. M. Herget in the book National Geographic on Indians of the Americas: a Color-Illustrated Record.

== Layout ==
A photo of Aztec's playfield

The plunger lane leads to the top of the machine where three rollover buttons are above three centrally and symmetrically located rollovers above three pop bumpers. The A of AZTEC is the middle of these rollovers, with Z, and E, on two stand-up targets on the left side of the machine, with T, and C on two stand-up targets on the right side of the machine. A lane on the left side of the machine contains the spinner, and leads back towards the upper rollovers. The kickback-lane is on the right side of the machine, and includes a kicker to eject the ball from the lane. There are two more stand-up targets, one near the bumpers, and one below them in the centre of the playfield. The slingshots above the flippers have four posts.

Lights show which AZTEC letters have been collected in the middle of the playfield, and in the kickback-lane. Eleven lights arranged in an arc on the lower part of the playfield are used to show the bonus points.

== Gameplay ==
The game is played with a single ball at a time with either 3 or 5 balls played in total, and has three difficulty settings.

Hitting the A target lights the spinner for higher points, the Z or T targets light double bonus. Completing A-Z-T or A-E-C from AZTEC lights the extra ball at the centre stand-up. Hitting all A-Z-T-E-C targets and advancing the bonus to 50,000 lights the special in the outlanes. Only one of the special lights can be lit, and it alternates with hitting other targets. An adjustment inside the cabinet sets the value of this special to a free credit or an extra ball.

The player can win a free game by the last 2 digits in their score randomly matching the number displayed in the top left of the backglass.

== Reception ==
In the first of his review articles for Play Meter, Roger Sharpe rated this machine 2.5/4 and found the artwork a great disappointment.

By November 1976 it had become the fifth highest earning pinball machine of the month.

== Solid State version ==
Aztec (solid state)
- Manufacturer: Williams
- System: Williams system 2
- Design: Gordon Horlick
- Artwork: Christian Marche
- Manufacturing date: November 1976
- Production run: 10

This version of Aztec, along with the solid state version of Grand Prix, was created to test the technology and reliability of the games. Over half the switches, relays, and solenoids in the electro-mechanical version were able to be removed for this version. The electronic components were supplied by Rockwell, with components for up to 50 prototype units.

Adjustments to settings are made using the "diode grid".

The solid state version received nearly twice the number of plays as the electro-mechanical version in the same period.

The production lines at Williams fully converted to solid state by December 1977.

This version was referred to in witness testimony in a court case when Bally took legal action for patent infringement.
