= Jones Morgan =

American Spanish–American War veteran (1882–1993)

- Born: October 23, 1882; Newberry County, South Carolina, U.S.
- Died: August 29, 1993 (aged 110); Richmond, Virginia, U.S.
- Military career
- Allegiance: United States
- Branch: United States Army
- Service years: 1896–1900
- Unit: 9th Cavalry Regiment
- Conflicts: Spanish–American War: Battle of San Juan Hill

Jones Morgan (October 23, 1882 – August 29, 1993) was an American man who claimed to have served as a Buffalo Soldier with the 9th Cavalry Regiment during the Spanish–American War. Contemporary accounts reported that Morgan joined the regiment while underage and served with the unit in Cuba in 1898, where he performed support duties rather than participating in combat.

Morgan was widely reported as the last surviving veteran of the Spanish–American War, but his military service could not be confirmed through surviving official records. His military records were reportedly destroyed in a fire, and the lack of documentation led to continuing uncertainty over his status as a veteran.

== Service ==
Morgan, being an African-American, joined the 9th Cavalry Regiment as a Buffalo Soldier in 1896. Being underage upon his enlistment would later contribute to the argument surrounding the legitimacy of Morgan's claims. Morgan served in a primary maintenance role, tending the horses of the Rough Riders and cooking meals for his fellow soldiers.

== Later years ==
Morgan fell into poverty in his old age, being provided free meals from church charity efforts. By 1986 he was renting a room, surviving on his Social Security pension check.

In the much later years of his life, especially after the death of Nathan E. Cook, who had long been hailed as not only the last surviving veteran of the Spanish–American War but of any American engagement, debate raged over the trustworthiness of Jones Morgan's claim to have served. Morgan did not receive any military benefits due to a lack of official papers providing evidence of his time in the army. Morgan attributed this to a fire in 1912 which destroyed the papers. Several experts, including military archivist Mike Knapp and Commander Carlton Philpot, USN, say no concrete evidence can be brought forth of Morgan's time in the army, but that they did not doubt him. Army record-keeping in the 1890s, to begin with, was inadequate, especially for black soldiers, who were treated like second-class citizens.

On October 5, 1992, the representative from Virginia's 3rd congressional district, Thomas J. Bliley, Jr., proposed on the floor of the United States House of Representatives a bill which would "grant Mr. Morgan the benefits he deserves," via an honorable discharge. In the three years before his death, Morgan became a popular local figure in Virginia. Morgan met former president George H. W. Bush and then-Chairman of the Joint Chiefs of Staff, General Colin Powell, and led the Veterans of Foreign Wars parade.

== Death ==
Jones died on August 23, 1993, aged 110. He was interred at the Forest Lawn Cemetery in Richmond, Virginia with a commemorative plaque atop his tombstone denoting Morgan as a Buffalo Soldier.

== See also ==
- Last surviving United States war veterans
- Nathan E. Cook
