= Steve Kordek =

Inventor (1911–2012)

- Born: Steven Francis Kordek; December 26, 1911; Chicago, Illinois, U.S.
- Died: February 19, 2012 (aged 100); Park Ridge, Illinois, U.S.
- Resting place: St. Adalbert Cemetery, Niles, Illinois, U.S.
- Known for: Pinball machine innovator
- Spouse: Harriet (Pieniazek) Kordek

Steven Francis Kordek (December 26, 1911 – February 19, 2012) was an American businessman of Polish descent who was best known for the design of pinball machines.

Kordek is credited with designing over 100 pinball machines, which in total sold about 180,000 units. Notable games include Grand Prix.The last game Kordek helped design was 2003's Vacation America, after his retirement from full time work in 2000. Among the companies that Kordek designed for are Genco, Williams and Bally.

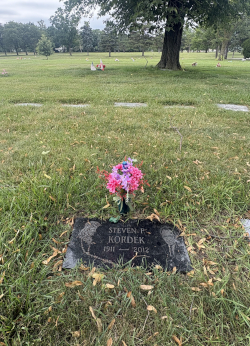
Kordek's grave at St. Adalbert Cemetery

He inadvertently entered the pinball business when visiting Chicago in 1937, and took shelter from the rain in Genco's building. He was mentored by game designer Harvey Heiss. After seeing the newly invented flippers on Gottlieb's Humpty Dumpty, Kordek designed a game in time for the January 1958 trade show, Triple Action. He used two flippers at the bottom of the machine, in what would subsequently become the traditional place. He remained at Genco until the company closed in 1958, joining Bally. 18 months later he accepted an offer from Sam Stern to join Williams, taking over design from Harry Mabs. Between 1961-1963, Kordek was the sole designer for Williams. During that time he designed 28 games, including Vagabond, the first pinball machine with a modern type of drop-target. Norm Clark joined as a second designer at Williams in 1964, alternating with Kordek's designs.

Kordek was credited with many innovations to pinball machines. He revised the pin game machines of the 1930s by putting two inward-facing flippers at the bottom of the playing field that were controlled by two buttons on the side of the machine. Other innovations credited to him include drop targets and multi-ball mode.

In 1993, Kordek appeared in an episode of Wild Chicago that toured the Williams factory.

Kordek died on February 19, 2012, at age 100, and was buried at St. Adalbert Cemetery in Niles, Illinois.
