= Katyń Memorial (Niles, Illinois) =

Monument in Niles, Illinois, United States

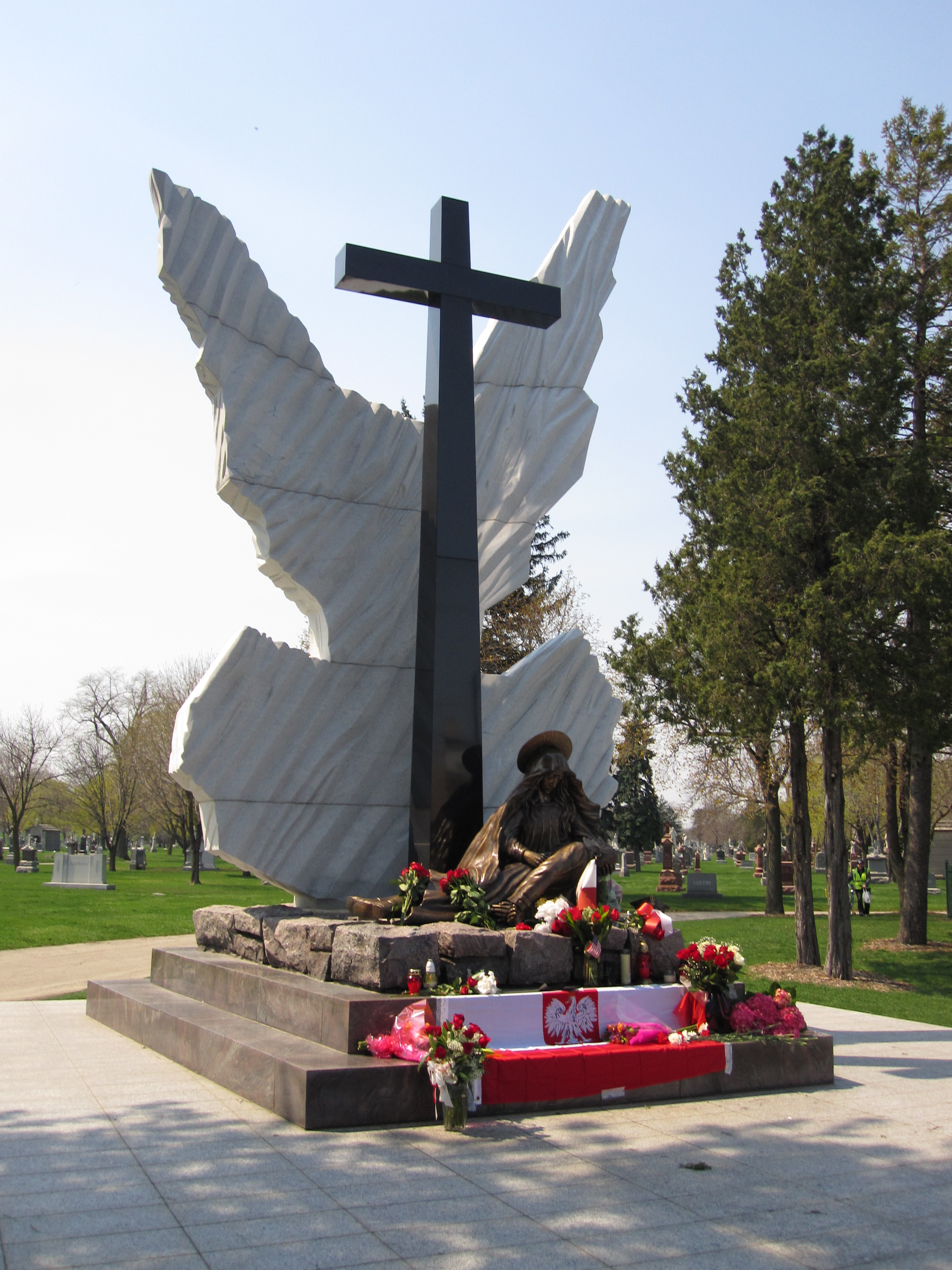
- The monument in 2010
- Interactive map of Katyń Memorial
- Location: 6800 North Milwaukee Avenue, St. Adalbert Cemetery, Niles, Illinois, United States
- Coordinates: 42°00′18.26″N 87°47′42.72″W
- Designer: Wojciech Seweryn
- Type: Statue
- Opening date: May 17, 2009
- Dedicated to: Katyn massacre

The Katyń Memorial (Polish pronunciation: [ˈka.tɘ̟ɲ]; Polish: Pomnik Katyński) is a monument in Niles in Illinois, United States, located at the St. Adalbert Cemetery. It commemorates the victims of the Katyn massacre, a series of mass executions of nearly 22,000 Polish military and police officers, border guards, and intelligentsia prisoners of war carried out in 1940 by the People's Commissariat for Internal Affairs of the Soviet Union. The sculpture was designed by Wojciech Seweryn, and unveiled on May 17, 2009. The monument features a statue of keeling Mary of Nazareth, holding in her arms a dead Polish soldier, with a large granite Christian cross behind her, and a sculpture made from white stone, forming outline of a military eagle, a symbol of the Polish Armed Forces, with a missing head.

== History ==
The monument was proposed and designed by sculptor Wojciech Seweryn, to commemorate the victims of the Katyn massacre, a series of mass executions of nearly 22,000 Polish military and police officers, border guards, and intelligentsia prisoners of war carried out in 1940 by the People's Commissariat for Internal Affairs of the Soviet Union. This included his father, lieutenant Mieczysław Seweryn, an officer of the 16th Infantry Division of the Polish Armed Forces. In 1994, Wojciech Seweryn founded the Committee for the Construction of the Katyn Memorial, and received a plot of land at the St. Adalbert Cemetery in Niles, Illinois from Francis George, the archbishop of the Archdiocese of Chicago. The fundraising activities lasted for nine years.

The cornerstone laying ceremony, begging its construction, was held on October 8, 2000, during a visit of cardinal Józef Glemp, the primate of Poland. The memorial was unveiled on May 17, 2009, in a consecration ceremony held by Glemp, and attended by almost 2,000 people, including representatives of the Polish diaspora, the veterans of the Second World War, and members of the scouting organizations. Witold Waszczykowski, the deputy chief of the National Security Bureau of Poland read the letter by President of Poland Lech Kaczyński, addressed to the attendants. A day prior, Seweryn was awarded the Officer's Cross of the Order of Merit of the Republic of Poland by Kaczyński.

On April 17, 2010, a ceremony was held in front of the monument, in memory of 96 casualties of the crash of the Tupolev Tu-154 aircraft in Smolensk, Russia, including President of Poland, Lech Kaczyński, First Lady Maria Kaczyńska, and other high-ranking government officials. Among them was also Wojciech Seweryn. The plane was en route to commemorations of the Katan massacre anniversary. A day prior, Sewery was posthumously awarded with the Commander's Cross of the Order of Polonia Restituta.

On September 25, 2011, a ceremony was held in front of the monument, during which a portion of Milwaukee Avenue was designated as Wojciech M. Seweryn Memorial Road. A commemorative plaque dedicated to him and other casualties of the air disasters was also unveiled. It was funded by the city of Tarnów, Poland.

== Design ==
The monument, revoking the motives of pietà, features a statue of keeling Mary of Nazareth, holding in her arms a dead Polish soldier who was a victim of the Katyn massacre. Behind her is a large granite Christian cross. At the back, is placed a sculpture made from white stone, depicting an outline of a military eagle, symbol of Polish Arm Forces, with a missing head, symbolising the loss of life in the Katyn massacre. Near the monument is also placed a plaque in memory of 96 casualties of the 2010 plane crash in Smolensk, Russia, including President of Poland, Lech Kaczyński, First Lady Maria Kaczyńska, and other high-ranking government officials, as well as author of the monument, Wojciech Seweryn.
