= Daniel F. Bakeman =

Last surviving American Revolutionary War soldier (1759–1869)

Daniel Frederick Bakeman
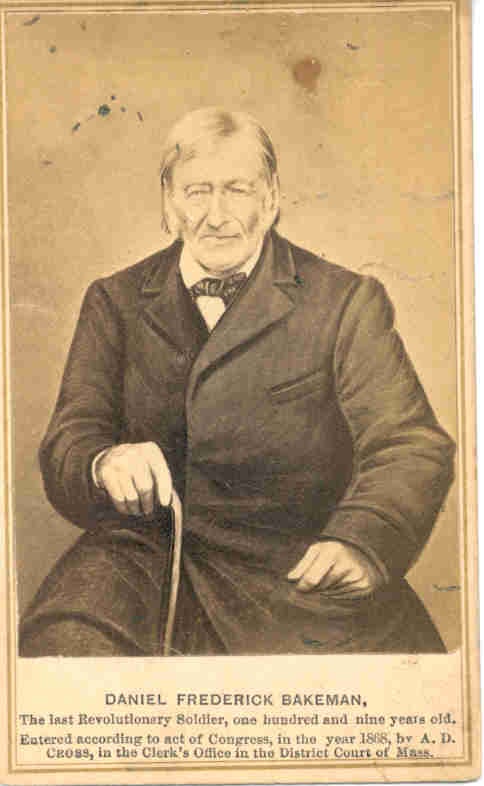
- Bakeman in 1868
- Born: October 9, 1759; Schoharie County, New York, British America
- Died: April 5, 1869 (aged 109); Freedom, New York, U.S.
- Burial place: Sandusky Cemetery, Freedom, New York, U.S.
- Spouse: Susan Brewer (m. 1782; died 1863)
- Children: 8
- Military career
- Allegiance: United States; New York
- Service years: 1777–1781
- Units: Tryon County Militia
- Conflicts: American Revolutionary War; Battle of Johnstown
- Other work: Farmer

Daniel Frederick Bakeman (October 9, 1759 – April 5, 1869) was the last survivor receiving a veteran's pension for service in the American Revolutionary War (1775–1783).

== Early life ==
Bakeman claimed that he was born on October 9, 1759, in Schoharie County, New York. Other sources indicate that he may have been born in northern New Jersey, near the Delaware River, and that his parents moved to the Schoharie County area when he was a boy. His parents were Dutch immigrants Andreas Phillip Bakeman and Catarien Miller, and his name sometimes appears in written records as "Bochman". He was baptized in Schenectady on November 27, 1773.

== American Revolution ==
According to Bakeman's later testimony, during the American Revolution, he served as a private in the Tryon County militia for the last four years of the war, and was a member of the company commanded by a captain named Van Arnum during the period when the county militia was commanded by Marinus Willett. According to an obituary, Bakeman took part in the 1781 Battle of Johnstown, and served as a teamster for the militia following his time in the ranks.

Though no captain named Van Arnum (possibly Van Aernam, a prominent family in Cattaraugus County in Bakeman's later life) or anything approximating it appears in the rolls of the Tryon County militia, and though no soldier named Bakeman or Bochman appears in the roll; the descriptions Bakeman provided of his Revolutionary service in the pension application he submitted later in life were judged to be credible. The US Department of the Interior had one listing of "Bakeman": "Bakeman, Henry of Granbry, Oswego" [County] with the following remarks: "Suspended for evidence of identity of the service credited to a soldier of the same name of Colonel Willett's regiment, Captain Peter B. Teare's company."

His Pension File is available online, containing 132 pages of details of his life and service.

== Post-war ==
After the war, Bakeman farmed in the Mohawk Valley. In 1782, he married Susan Brewer, and they were the parents of eight children: Philip, Richard, Christopher, Betsey, Margaret, Susan, Mary, and Christine. Records show that in 1825 the Bakeman family settled in Arcade, New York, where they owned a home on the north side of the County Line Road. In 1845 they moved to Freedom, New York, and they later moved to Stark. Bakeman appeared in the 1860 United States census as "Frederick Bakeman" living in Freedom with his wife, his daughter Susan, and a grandchild, Jacob N. Bakeman (born 1838). His wife died on September 10, 1863, at the age of 105, after 81 years of marriage.

In Bakeman's later years, he was often called upon by local leaders to take part in important ceremonies, and on Independence Day he was known to march around Freedom firing salutes with his musket.

== Later life ==
Bakeman was the victim of house fires at least three times during his lifetime, including once while on a four-day trip from central New York to Albany to buy wheat and other farm supplies. In the mid-1860s, he applied for a pension, and stated that the records of his service burned in one of his house fires. As with many veterans who could not provide discharge certificates or other verifying documents, Bakeman's application included affidavits from friends and neighbors, who attested that he had a reputation for honesty, and that they had previously heard him describe his military service. The testimony of these individuals and Bakeman's own affidavit were judged to be credible, and on February 14, 1867, the United States Congress passed a special act which granted Bakeman a pension of $500 per year. At the time, the longest surviving veterans who were on the pension rolls were Lemuel Cook of Clarendon, New York (died May 20, 1866), and Samuel Downing of Edinburgh, New York (died February 19, 1867). George Fruits (died August 6, 1876) also claimed to be the last surviving veteran of the Revolutionary War, but he was never on the pension rolls, and research by A. Ross Eckler Jr. in the 1970s indicated that Fruits was 17 years younger than he claimed, and was not a veteran of the Revolution.

== Death and burial ==
Bakeman died in Freedom on April 5, 1869, and is buried in Freedom's Sandusky Cemetery. The Annual Report of the U.S. Commissioner of Pensions for 1874 noted that "With the death of Daniel T. Bakeman, of Freedom, Cattaraugus County, N.Y., April 5, 1869, the last of the pensioned soldiers of the Revolution passed away."

== See also ==
- Last surviving United States war veterans
- List of centenarians
