= Hiram Cronk =

American veteran of the War of 1812 (1800–1905)

- Born: April 19, 1800; Frankfort, New York, U.S.
- Died: May 13, 1905 (aged 105); Dunn Brook, Oneida County, New York, U.S.
- Burial place: Cypress Hills National Cemetery
- Occupations: Farmer, shoemaker
- Spouse: Mary Thornton (m. 1824; died 1885)
- Children: 7
- Military service
- Allegiance: United States
- Branch: New York Militia
- Service years: 1814
- Rank: Private
- Units: Captain Edmund Fuller's Company
- Wars: War of 1812

Hiram Cronk (April 19, 1800 – May 13, 1905) was an American soldier and the last surviving U.S. veteran of the War of 1812. He served as a private in the New York Militia in 1814.

Cronk was born in Frankfort, New York, in 1800. He later worked as a farmer and shoemaker and had seven children. He died in 1905 at the age of 105 and was buried at Cypress Hills National Cemetery.

== Early life and military service ==
Hiram Cronk was born in Frankfort, New York, on April 19, 1800. He was mustered into federal service as a private in Captain Edmund Fuller's Company (detached from the New York Militia) on October 8, 1814. Having served five weeks in defense of Sackett's Harbor, he was mustered out on November 16, 1814. The Cronk family was of Dutch descent.

== Later life and death ==
Cronk's funeral procession, 1905

Cronk spent most of his life working as a shoemaker. For his wartime service, he received a pension of $12 per month. In 1903, Congress increased it to $25 per month. He also received a special pension of $72 per month from the State of New York. He died in Dunn Brook, Oneida County, New York, on May 13, 1905, at the age of 105.

After his death, Cronk's body was displayed in the main lobby of New York City Hall. An estimated 925,000 people paid their respects. He is interred in the Mount of Victory, Cypress Hills National Cemetery, Brooklyn, New York.

== Personal life ==
Cronk married Mary Thornton in 1825, with whom he had seven children. At the time of his death, he had 14 grandchildren and eight great-grandchildren (his great-granddaughter Jane lived to over 100 years of age, making the two "serial centenarians").

== See also ==
- Last surviving United States war veterans
