= Wojciech Seweryn =

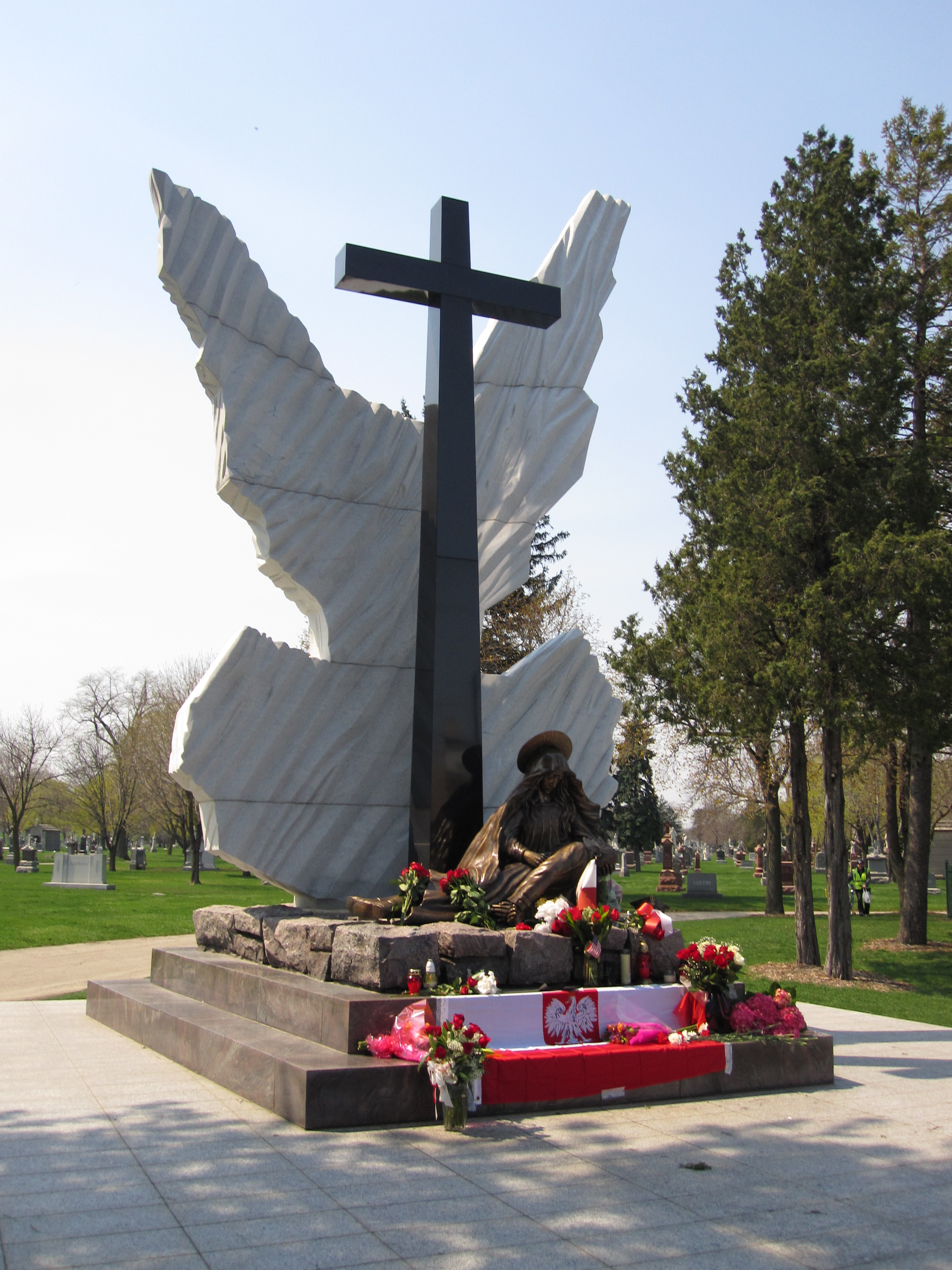
The Katyn Memorial in Niles, Illinois, designed by Wojciech Seweryn.

Wojciech Seweryn (August 31, 1939 – April 10, 2010) was a Polish sculptor and longtime resident of the United States. Seweryn was born in Tarnów, graduated from the School of Fine Arts in Tarnów, and studied at the Jan Matejko Academy of Fine Arts in Kraków. He immigrated to Chicago in the mid-1970s. The son of a 16th Infantry Regiment reserve officer killed in the Katyn massacre, he later designed and constructed a memorial commemorating the Katyn massacre in Niles, Illinois; this was inaugurated in 2009. He was among those killed along with President of Poland, Lech Kaczyński, First Lady Maria Kaczyńska, and many other prominent Polish leaders in the 2010 Polish Air Force Tu-154 crash near Smolensk.

He was awarded the Officer's Cross of the Order of Merit of the Republic of Poland, by order of President Lech Kaczynski on 8 May 2009, "for outstanding achievements in commemorating the fate of the Polish nation, for social and charitable activities. Six days after the Tu-154 crash in Smolensk on April 16, 2010, Seweryn was posthumously awarded the Commander's Cross of the Order of Polonia Restituta.

A stretch of Milwaukee Avenue in Niles, Illinois was renamed in his honor in 2011.
