= Israel Adam Broadsword =

American Civil War veteran (1846–1952)

- Born: Israel Aaron Broadsword; December 23, 1846; Ottawa, Ohio
- Died: July 25, 1952 (aged 105); Spokane, Washington
- Spouse(s): Sarah Elizabeth Hamilton (m. 1871; div. 1872); Amy Diana Viola Morris (m. 1872)
- Children: 11
- Military career
- Allegiance: Union
- Branch: Union Army
- Service years: 1861–1865, 1868–1869
- Rank: Sergeant
- Units: 51st Missouri Infantry Regiment; 19th Kansas Cavalry Regiment
- Conflicts: American Civil War; First Battle of Lexington; American Indian Wars; Battle of the Washita River

Israel Adam Broadsword (December 23, 1846 – July 25, 1952) was an American Civil War veteran from Ohio and a Free-Stater. He served in the Union Army during the Civil War and later served in the American Indian Wars.

Broadsword served in the 51st Missouri Infantry Regiment during the Civil War and later in the 19th Kansas Cavalry Regiment. His wartime service included the First Battle of Lexington and the Battle of the Washita River. He died in Spokane, Washington, in 1952 at the age of 105.

== Early Years ==
Israel was second eldest child of John Adam Broadsword (1820–1894) and Mary Magdalene Crites (1822–1910). Israel and his family lived in Kansas during Bleeding Kansas. Israel and his family were Free-Staters, those who believed that Kansas should be free of slavery.

== Military career ==
=== Civil War ===
During the Civil War, when Israel was 14-years-old, he enlisted in the Company H of the 51st Missouri Infantry Regiment and fought in the Siege of Lexington from September 13, to September 20, 1861.

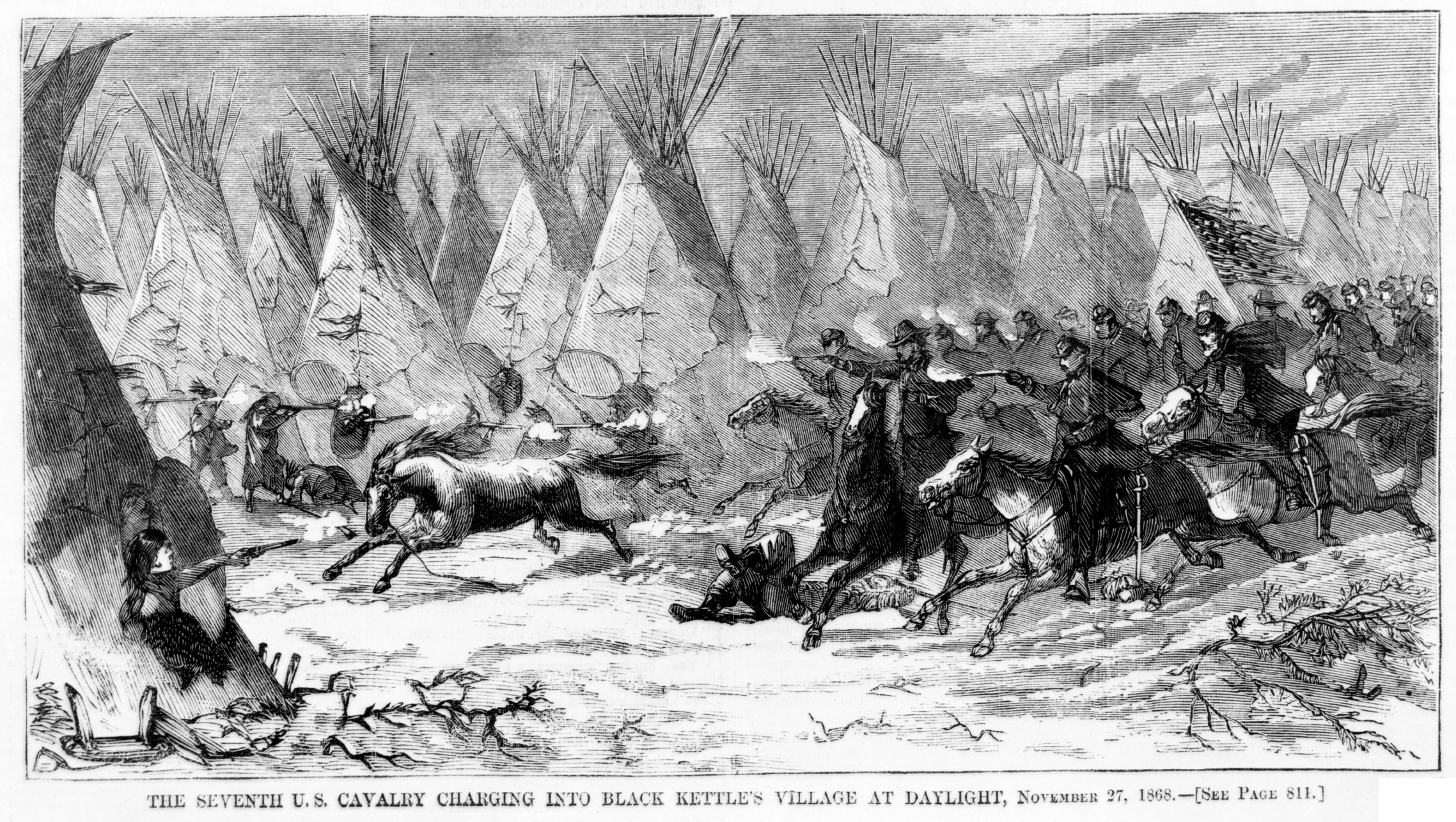
Battle of the Washita River (1868)

=== American Indian Wars ===
From 1868 to 1869, Israel enlisted in the 19th Kansas Calvary and fought Sioux warriors in Oklahoma. On November 27, 1868, Israel fought in the Battle of Washita River in Cheyenne, Oklahoma, which saw Major Joel Elliott be murdered and mutilated.

== Post War ==
Following his service, Israel married his first wife, Sarah Elizabeth Hamilton (1854–1930), on May 18, 1871. However, Israel divorced Sarah and married Amy Diana Viola Morris (1855–1900) on June 15, 1872. Israel and Amy had 11 children between 1873 and 1900, among these children was William Strout Broadsword (1893–1976), a World War I veteran and father of Edward Dalton Broadsword (1927–1995) and a World War II veteran. In 1929, he moved to Idaho and stayed there until his death in 1952. At the time of his death he was one of the four last surviving Civil War veterans, the others were James A. Hard, William A. Magee, and Albert Woolson.
