= Warren Upton =

World War II veteran and Pearl Harbor survivor

- Born: 17 October 1919; El Dorado, California, United States
- Died: 25 December 2024 (aged 105); Los Gatos, California, United States
- Military career
- Allegiance: United States
- Branch: United States Navy
- Service years: 1941–1945; 1950–1953
- Known for: Survivor of the attack on Pearl Harbor

Warren "Red" Upton (17 October 1919 – 25 December 2024) was an American World War II veteran who served in the United States Navy. He was one of the last living survivors of the attack on Pearl Harbor on December 7, 1941, having been stationed aboard the battleship USS Utah.

== Early life ==
Upton was born in El Dorado, California. He enlisted in the United States Navy as a teenager prior to the United States' entry into World War II, part of a generation of young servicemen who joined during the rapid military buildup of the early 1940s.

== Military service ==
Upton was assigned to the battleship USS Utah, which was moored at Pearl Harbor, Hawaii, on the morning of December 7, 1941. During the Japanese attack, Utah was struck by torpedoes and capsized within minutes.

Upton survived by escaping the overturned vessel under hazardous conditions. Sixty-four crew members were killed aboard Utah, many of whom remain entombed within the ship, which is now a designated war grave.

Following the attack, Upton continued to serve in the Navy as a radioman throughout World War II before being discharged at the conclusion of the conflict. He later served again during the Korean War.

== Later life ==
After the war, Upton returned to civilian life and later settled in California. In his later years, he became active in public education and remembrance efforts, frequently speaking at schools, museums, and memorial events about his experiences at Pearl Harbor and the importance of historical memory.

As the number of living Pearl Harbor survivors declined, Upton gained national recognition as one of the final firsthand witnesses to the attack, often emphasizing the lesser-known loss of the USS Utah compared with other ships sunk that day.

== Death ==
Warren Upton died on 25 December 2024 in Los Gatos, California, at the age of 105. At the time of his death, he was widely reported to be the last surviving crew member of the USS Utah and among the final living survivors of the Pearl Harbor attack.
