= USS Narragansett (SP-2196) =

US Navy transport ship

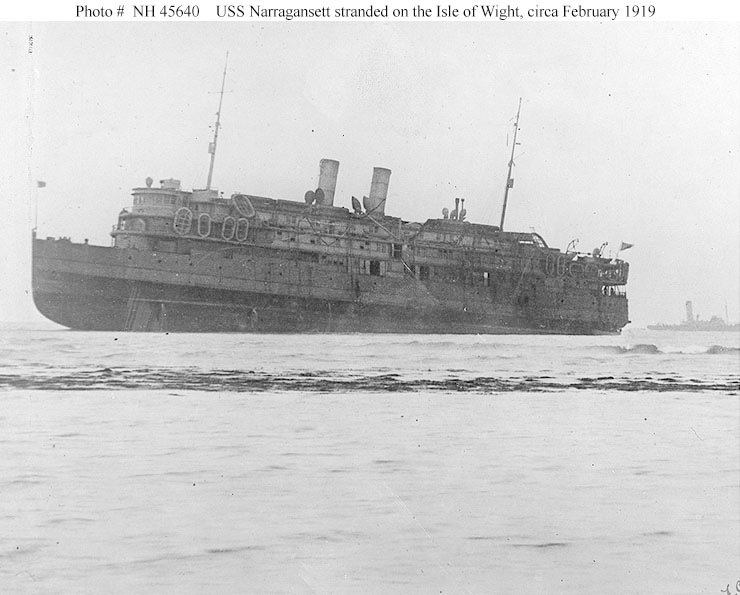

History

United States
- Name: USS Narragansett
- Builder: Harlan and Hollingsworth, Wilmington, Delaware
- Launched: 1913
- Acquired: by purchase, 11 January 1918
- Commissioned: 28 January 1918
- Decommissioned: 12 September 1919
- Fate: Sold, 13 August 1920

General characteristics
- Type: Transport ship
- Displacement: 19,503 long tons (19,816 t)
- Length: 320 ft 2 in (97.59 m)
- Beam: 48 ft 1 in (14.66 m)
- Draft: 16 ft (4.9 m)
- Speed: 23 knots (43 km/h; 26 mph)
- Troops: 1,400
- Complement: 165 officers and enlisted
- Armament: None

The second USS Narragansett (SP-2196) was a transport ship in the United States Navy.

Narragansett was launched by Harlan and Hollingsworth, Wilmington, Delaware, in 1913. She was acquired through purchase from the Central Vermont Transportation Co., on 11 January 1918, and commissioned at New London, on 28 January 1918.

== Service history ==
On 14 February 1918, Narragansett departed New London and steamed to Wilmington, Delaware, for overhaul and alterations necessary for troop transport service. In May, she shifted to Philadelphia, whence she sailed, in June, to New York. On 10 July, she departed New York, in convoy, arriving at Saint-Nazaire and reporting for duty in the Cross Channel Fleet on the 21st. From that time until the Armistice, Narragansett served as a unit of that fleet, which was charged with the highly important mission of keeping men and materiel, especially coal, flowing from the British Isles to the Continent. During August and September, Narragansett crossed from Southampton to Le Havre twice a week. In October, she cut back to once a week, but, throughout, she carried an average of over 1,400 troops per voyage.

After the Armistice, the transport reversed her mission and commenced carrying troops from France to England. With the new year, 1919, she extended her operational area to include the North Sea and the Baltic Sea ports of Rotterdam, Hamburg, and Copenhagen.

On 31 January, however, Narragansett, en route to Southampton, went aground due to the Pilot losing his bearings in a snowstorm, on the Bembridge Ledge, Isle of Wight. All the troops were taken off by relief boats from Southampton that night . She was successfully refloated and back in Southampton 3 weeks later. Repairs required two months.

She departed Plymouth for New York on 30 May and arrived in New York on 15 June. Decommissioned on 12 September at Hoboken, N.J., she was sold on 13 August 1920.
