= List of last surviving veterans of military operations =

This is a chronological list of the last known surviving veterans of battles, sieges, campaigns, and other military operations throughout history. The listed operations span from the 5th century BC to the end of World War II. Excluded from this list are last living veterans of wars and insurgencies.

== Pre-17th century ==
Engagement	Starting date	Service	Name	Lifespan	Notes
Battle of Thermopylae	30 August/ 8–10 September, 480 BC	Spartan Army	Aristodemus of Sparta	?–479 BC	Killed in action at Plataea.
Battle of Badr	13 March 624	Muslim Army	Abu al-Yusr Ka'b ibn Amr	599–675	Last soldier to serve under Muhammad at the battle.
Battle of Hastings	14 October 1066	Norman Army	Robert de Beaumont, 1st Earl of Leicester	c.1050 – 1118	Last Norman nobleman to participate.

== 17th century ==
Engagement	Starting date	Service	Name	Lifespan	Notes
Battle of Edgehill	23 October 1642	Royalist Army	William Hiseland	1620–1732	Last veteran of the English Civil War.
Battle of Killiecrankie	27 July 1689	Scottish militia	John Dennis	c.1668 – 1770	

== 18th century ==
Engagement	Starting date	Service	Name	Lifespan	Notes
Battle of Malplaquet	11 September 1709	British Army	Ambrose Tennant	c.1693 – 1800	
Battle of Sheriffmuir	13 November 1715	British Army	John Hastie	1698–1798	
Battle of Culloden	16 April 1746	Jacobite Army	Auld Dubrach	1714?–1824	Claimed last Jacobite.
Siege of Fort William Henry	3 August 1757	British Army	David Thompson Jr.	1736–1836	
Siege of Louisbourg	8 June 1758	British Army	James Thompson	1733–1830	Served as an engineer.
Battle of Quebec	13 September 1759	British Army	James Thompson	1733–1830	Served as an engineer.
Siege of Havana	6 June 1762	British Army	Ezekiel Blackmar	1742–1841	
Battle of Point Pleasant	10 October 1774	Virginia militia	Samuel Bonnifield	1752–1848	
Battles of Lexington and Concord	19 April 1775	Massachusetts Minutemen	Jonathan Harrington	1758–1854	Last Lexington veteran.
Battles of Lexington and Concord	19 April 1775	Massachusetts Minutemen	Amos Baker	1756–1850	Last Concord veteran.
Battle of Kings Mountain	7 October 1780	Continental Army	Robert Henry	1767–1863	
Battle of Dogger Bank	5 August 1781	Dutch Royal Navy	Abraham Losgert	1764–1856	Served on Admiraal Piet Hein.
Battle of Groton Heights	6 September 1781	Continental Army	Robert Gallup	1760–1858	
Siege of Yorktown	28 September 1781	Continental Army	John Gray	1764–1868	
Battle of Turnhout	27 October 1789	Brabant Revolutionary Army	Antoon Coninckx-Bollen	1775–1868	
Battle of Maciejowice	10 October 1794	Polish Army	Antoni Piórecki	1764–1870	
Battle of Cape St Vincent	14 February 1797	British Royal Navy	Henry King	1783–1874	Served on HMS Namur.

== 19th century ==
Engagement	Starting date	Service	Name	Lifespan	Notes
Battle of Trafalgar	21 October 1805	Spanish Navy	Gaspar Costela Vasquez	1787–1892	Served on Santa Ana.
Battle of Trafalgar	21 October 1805	French Navy	Emmanuel Louis Cartigny	1790–1892	Served on Redoutable.
Battle of Trafalgar	21 October 1805	British Royal Navy	Joseph Sutherland	1789–1890	Served on HMS Beaulieu.
Battle of Austerlitz	2 December 1805	French Army	Philippe C. Drummel	1797–1892	
Battle of Corunna	16 January 1809	British Army	Thomas Palmer	1789–1889	
French invasion of Russia	24 June 1812	French Army	Nicolas Savin	1792?–1894	
French invasion of Russia	24 June 1812	Russian Army	Vasilij Nikolaevich Kochetkov	1785–1892	
Battle of Smolensk	16 August 1812	French Army	Hector Nizole	1793–1893	
USS Constitution vs HMS Guerriere	19 August 1812	United States Navy	Joseph Burrows Tifftz	1782–1878	Served on USS Constitution.
Battle of Borodino	7 September 1812	Russian Army	Vasilij Nikolaevich Kochetkov	1785–1892	
Capture of USS Chesapeake	1 June 1813	British Royal Navy	Provo Wallis	1791–1892	Served on HMS Shannon.
Capture of USS Chesapeake	1 June 1813	United States Navy	Benjamin Trefethen	1790–1886	Served on USS Chesapeake.
Battle of the Thames	5 October 1813	United States Army	David McCoy	1790–1895	
Battle of Leipzig	16 October 1813	Austrian Army	Anton Lipp	1793?–1895	
Battle of Leipzig	16 October 1813	Russian Army	Vasilij Nikolaevich Kochetkov	1785–1892	
Battle of Paris	30 March 1814	French Army	Émile Mellinet	1798–1894	
Battle of Paris	30 March 1814	Russian Army	Vasilij Nikolaevich Kochetkov	1785–1892	
Battle of Baltimore	12 September 1814	United States Army	Elijah Bouldin Glenn	1796–1898	
Battle of North Point	12 September 1814	United States Army	William Welsh	1800–1894	
Battle of New Orleans	8 January 1815	United States Army	Joseph Coffman	1804–1897	
Battle of Ligny	16 June 1815	French Army	Constantin Benoit Joseph Denis	1793–1893	
Battle of Waterloo	16 June 1815	French Army	Louis-Victor Baillot	1793–1898	
Battle of Waterloo	16 June 1815	British Army	Ferdinand Scharnhorst	1799–1893	King's German Legion.
Battle of Quatre Bras	18 June 1815	French Army	Louis-Victor Baillot	1793–1898	
Siege of Salvador	2 July 1823	Imperial Brazilian Navy	Marquis of Tamandaré	1807–1897	Served on frigate Niterói
Battle of Juncal	9 February 1827	Argentine Navy	Enrique Sinclair	1805–1904	
Battle of Navarino	20 October 1827	British Royal Navy	John W. Stainer	1808–1907	Served on HMS Talbot.
Battle of Navarino	20 October 1827	French Navy	Louis Pèlabon	1814–1906	Served on Sirène.
Ten Days' Campaign	2 August 1831	Dutch Royal Army	Corstiaan Hagers	1811–1915	Last holder of the Metal Cross.
Ten Days' Campaign	2 August 1831	Belgian Revolutionary Army	Jean-Philippe Lavallé	1809–1913	Fought at Leuven.
Battle of the Alamo	23 February 1836	Texan Army	Benjamin Franklin Highsmith	1817–1905	Left as a courier during the siege.
Battle of San Jacinto	21 April 1836	Texan Army	William Physick Zuber	1820–1913	
Battle of Sidi Brahim	22 September 1845	French Army	Guillaume Rolland	1821–1915	
Siege of Fort Texas	3 May 1846	United States Army	Josiah Turner	1826–1916	
Battle of Monterey	7 July 1846	United States Army	Anson A. Pike	1820–1916	
Siege of Veracruz	9 March 1847	United States Navy	Owen Thomas Edgar	1831–1929	Served on USS Potomac.
Battle of Churubusco	20 August 1847	Mexican Army	Antonio Rincón Gallardo	1833–1928	
Battle of Churubusco	20 August 1847	United States Army	Amasa Gleason Clark	1825–1927	
Battle for Mexico City	8 September 1847	United States Navy	Owen Thomas Edgar	1831–1929	Served on USS Allegheny.
Battle of Chapultepec	12 September 1847	United States Army	Calvin E. Myers	1830–1928	
Battle of Isaszeg	6 April 1849	Hungarian Revolutionary Army	József Fischl	1827–1929	
Battle of Segesvár	31 July 1849	Hungarian Revolutionary Army	József Fischl	1827–1929	
Battle of Bomarsund	21 June 1854	British Royal Navy	Francis John Peake Shapcote	1837–1937	Served on HMS St Jean d'Acre.
Charge of the Light Brigade	25 October 1854	British Army	Edwin Hughes	1830–1927	
Thin Red Line	25 October 1854	British Army	Charles Ellingworth	1833–1927	
Battle of Inkerman	5 November 1854	British Army	Joseph Pritchard Wellspring	1839–1933	
Battle of the Eureka Stockade	3 December 1854	Stockade rebels	William Edward Atherdon	1838–1936	
Defence of the Magazine at Delhi	11 May 1857	British East India Company	John Buckley	1813–1876	
Battle of Magenta	4 June 1859	Sardinian Army	Simone Piffaretti	1843–1940	
Battle of Solferino	24 June 1859	Austrian Army	Anton Neubauer	1836–1941	
Battle of Solferino	24 June 1859	Sardinian Army	Simone Piffaretti	1843–1940	
Battle of Fort Sumter	12 April 1861	Union Army	William Henry Hamner	1838–1925	
Battle of Philippi	3 June 1861	Union Army	James Wesley Bodley	1842–1935	
Battle of Boonville	17 June 1861	Union Army	Charles John Walden	1844–1932	
First Battle of Bull Run	21 July 1861	Union Army	James Hard	1841–1951	
Battle of Hampton Roads	8 March 1862	Confederate Navy	John Patrick Kevill	1844–1941	Served on CSS Virginia.
Battle of Hampton Roads	8 March 1862	Union Navy	John Ambrose Driscoll	1839–1921	Served on USS Monitor.
Battle of Shiloh	6 April 1862	Union Army	Daniel A. Wedge	1841–1947	
Andrews' Raid	12 April 1862	Union Army	John Reed Porter	1838–1923	
Andrews' Raid	12 April 1862	Confederate Army	Henry P. Haney	1846–1923	
Battle of Puebla	5 May 1862	Mexican Army	Francisco Arellano Zenteno	1842–1935	
Seven Days Battles	25 June 1862	Union Army	James Hard	1841–1951	
Battle of Gaines's Mill	27 June 1862	Union Army	James Hard	1841–1951	
Battle of Malvern Hill	1 July 1862	Union Army	James Hard	1841–1951	
Battle of Fort Ridgely	20 September 1862	Union Army	Charles Marian Culver	1849–1943	
Battle of Antietam	17 September 1862	Union Army	James Hard	1841–1951	
Battle of Fredericksburg	11 December 1862	Union Army	Charles Douglass	1847–1950	
Battle of Stones River	31 December 1862	Confederate Army	Samuel Merrill Raney	1847–1950	
Battle of Stones River	31 December 1862	Union Army	George Washington Grizzle	1845–1949	
Battle of Chancellorsville	30 April 1863	Union Army	James Hard	1841–1951	
Battle of Camerone	30 April 1863	French Army (French Foreign Legion)	Hippolyte Kuwasseg	1843–1904	Served in the 3rd company of the 1st Foreign Regiment.
Siege of Vicksburg	18 May 1863	Union Army	Derritt Higgins Chapman	1845–1948	
Siege of Vicksburg	18 May 1863	Confederate Army	Solomon Bedford Strickland	1839?–1947	
Morgan's Raid	11 June 1863	Union Army	Thomas F. Ambrose	1849–1949	
Battle of Gettysburg	1 July 1863	Union Army	James Marion Lurvey	1847–1950	
Battle of Gettysburg	1 July 1863	Confederate Army	James D. Dickerson	1844–1948	
Second Battle of Fort Wagner	18 July 1863	Union Army	Eli G. Biddle	1846–1940	Last member of the 54th Massachusetts.
Defence of Pukekohe East	13 September 1863	British Army	Joseph Corbett Scott	1838–1940	
Battle of Chickamauga	18 September 1863	Union Army	William Evan Whittinghill	1848–1949	
Battle of Missionary Ridge	25 November 1863	Union Army	William Evan Whittinghill	1848–1949	
Battle of Dybbøl	7 April 1864	Danish Army	Ove Henning Jacobsen	1841–1941	
Battle of the Wilderness	5 May 1864	Union Army	John Henry Grate	1845–1949	
Battle of Spotsylvania Court House	8 May 1864	Union Army	Charles H. Duckworth	1846–1949	
Battle of Heligoland	9 May 1864	Danish Royal Navy	Hans Hansen	1842–1939	Served on Jylland.
Battle of New Market	15 May 1864	Union Army	Charles H. Duckworth	1846–1949	
Siege of Petersburg	15 June 1864	Confederate Army	Pleasant Crump	1847–1951	
Siege of Petersburg	15 June 1864	Union Army	Charles Lysander Chappel	1847–1949	
Battle of Cherbourg	19 June 1864	Union Navy	William Alsdorf	1843–1933	Served on USS Kearsarge.
Battle of Cherbourg	19 June 1864	Confederate Navy	Arthur Sinclair	1837–1925	Served on CSS Alabama.
Battle of the Crater	30 July 1864	Confederate Army	Theodore Norman Mayo	1845–1948	
Battle of the Crater	30 July 1864	Union Army	Alvin Smith	1843–1948	
Battle of Mobile Bay	2 August 1864	Union Navy	Henry Doll	1848–1947	Served on USS Hartford.
Sherman's March to the Sea	15 November 1864	Union Army	John Simon Dumser	1847–1949	
Battle of Franklin	30 November 1864	Union Army	Michael Joseph Thralls	1843–1950	
Battle of Nashville	15 December 1864	Union Army	Michael Joseph Thralls	1843–1950	
Second Battle of Fort Fisher	13 January 1865	Confederate Army	George Washington Benson	1846–1948	
Second Battle of Fort Fisher	13 January 1865	Union Navy	Henry Doll	1848–1947	Served on USS Brooklyn.
Battle of Bentonville	19 March 1865	Confederate Army	Ruffin Van Buren Collie	1844–1951	
Battle of Bentonville	19 March 1865	Union Army	John Simon Dumser	1847–1949	
Wilson's Raid	22 March 1865	Union Army	Charles H. Duckworth	1846–1949	
Battle of Palmito Ranch	12 May 1865	Confederate Army	Henry Spangler	1845–1938	
Battle of Lissa	20 July 1866	Italian Royal Navy	Giovanni Simoncini	1840?–1940	Served on Gaeta.
Paris Commune	18 March 1870	Communard revolutionaries	Adrien Lejeune	1847–1942	
Paris Commune	18 March 1870	French Army	Eugène François Louis Liné	1850–1940	
Battle of Bazeilles	1 September 1870	French Army	Alexandre Rioland	1847–1935	
Siege of Paris	19 September 1870	French Army	Émile Chausse	1850–1941	
Second Battle of Adobe Walls	27 June 1874	Comanche warriors	Yellowfish	1856–1943	
Second Battle of Adobe Walls	27 June 1874	Adobe Walls bison hunters	Wesley Kavanaugh Myers	1854–1939	
Battle of the Little Bighorn	25 June 1876	Lakota warriors	Dewey "Iron Hail" Beard	1858–1955	Miniconjou Lakota.
Battle of the Little Bighorn	25 June 1876	United States Army	Charles Windolph	1851–1950	
Battle of Rorke's Drift	22 January 1879	British Army	Frank Bourne	1854–1945	
Battle of Iquique	21 May 1879	Chilean Navy	Wenceslao Vargas	1861–1958	Served on Esmeralda.
Battle of Angamos	8 October 1879	Peruvian Navy	Manuel Elías Bonnemaison	1862–1961	Served on Huáscar.
Battle of Majuba Hill	27 February 1881	Boer Army	Jacob Coetzer	1866–1969	
Battle of Fish Creek	24 April 1885	Canadian Army	William Dickie Mills	1866–1971	
Battle of Batoche	9 May 1885	Canadian Army	William Dickie Mills	1866–1971	
Battle of Dogali	26 January 1887	Italian Royal Army	Luigi Zoli	1865–1956	
Battle of Adwa	1 March 1896	Italian Royal Army	Luigi Naccarato	1870–1975	
Battle of Manila Bay	1 May 1898	United States Navy	Archibald M. Forbis	1878–1981	Served on USS McCulloch.
Battle of San Juan Hill	1 July 1898	United States Army	Ralph Waldo Taylor	1882–1987	
Siege of Baler	1 July 1898	Spanish Army	Emilio Fabregat Fabregat	1878–1960	
Battle of Omdurman	2 September 1898	British Army	James Richard Miles	1879–1977	
Battle of Sugar Point	5 October 1898	United States Army	Hubert V. Eva	1869–1971	
Battle of Spion Kop	23 January 1900	Boer Army	Pieter Arnoldus Krueler	1885–1986	
Siege of Catubig	15 April 1900	United States Army	William John Otjen	1879–1973	

== 20th century ==
Engagement	Starting date	Service	Name	Lifespan	Notes
Battle of Tsushima	27 May 1905	Imperial Japanese Navy	Okura Meiji	1884–1982	Served on Asama.
Battle of Tsushima	27 May 1905	Imperial Russian Navy	Jerzy Wołkowicki	1883–1983	Served on Imperator Nikolai I.
Battle of Yangxia	18 October 1911	Tongmenghui Revolutionary Army	Yu Yuzhi	1889–1993	
Battle of Sciara Sciatt	23 October 1911	Italian Royal Army	Luigi Gilardi	1892–1993	
Battle of Misrata	16 June 1912	Italian Royal Army	Guido Bellucci	1890–1994	
Battle of Coyotepe Hill	3 October 1912	Liberal Party revolutionaries	José Pánfilo Ramos Sevilla Pánfilo	1893–2001	
First Dogfight	30 November 1913	Carrancistas	Dean Ivan Lamb	1886–1955	Mercenary pilot hired to fly for General Benjamín G. Hill's forces.
Battle of the Frontiers	7 August 1914	French Army	Lazare Ponticelli	1897–2008	
Battle of Halen	12 August 1914	Belgian Army	Arsène Joseph Becuwe	1891–1992	
Battle of Mons	23 August 1914	British Army	James Davidson	1897–1999	BEF.
Battle of Le Cateau	26 August 1914	British Army	Michael Lally	1894–1999	BEF.
Siege of Tsingtao	27 August 1914	Imperial German Navy	Paul Kley	1894–1992	Seebataillon.
First Battle of the Marne	6 September 1914	French Army	Raymond Abescat	1891–2001	
Battle of Zanzibar	20 Sep 1914	British Royal Navy	Leonard Claude Lawrance	1890–1982	Served on HMS Pegasus.
First Battle of Ypres	19 October 1914	British Army	William Elder	1897–2005	BEF.
Battle of Tanga	3 November 1914	German East African colonial Army	Malonde Maseru	1894–1996	Schutztruppe.
Battle of Cocos	9 November 1914	Australian Royal Navy	Sidney Sullivan	1896–1997	Served on HMAS Sydney.
Battle of Cocos	9 November 1914	Imperial German Navy	Heyo Aden-Emden	1890–1989	Served on SMS Emden.
Christmas Truce	24–26 December 1914	British Army	Alfred Anderson	1896–2005	1/5th Angus and Dundee Battalion of the Black Watch (Royal Highland Regiment).
Gallipoli Campaign	17 February 1915	Australian Army	Alec Campbell	1899–2002	ANZAC.
Gallipoli Campaign	17 February 1915	British Army	Percy Goring	1894–2001	MEF.
Gallipoli Campaign	17 February 1915	French Army	Ernest Stocanne	1894–1999	CEO.
Gallipoli Campaign	17 February 1915	French Navy	Pierre L'Huillier	1895–1998	Served on the battleship Saint Louis.
Gallipoli Campaign	17 February 1915	Ottoman Army	Adil Şahin	1898–1998	III Corps. Fought at the Landing at Anzac Cove.
Gallipoli Campaign	17 February 1915	British Royal Navy	John "Jack" Walter Gearing	1894–1997	Served on HMS Theseus.
Gallipoli Campaign	17 February 1915	New Zealand Army	Alfred Douglas Dibley	1896–1997	ANZAC.
Gallipoli Campaign	17 February 1915	Australian Royal Navy	Charles George Suckling	1893–1984	Served on HMAS AE2.
Battle of Neuve Chapelle	10 March 1915	British Army	Alfred Anderson	1896–2005	BEF. Last known participant of the Christmas truce.
Second Battle of Ypres	2 April 1915	British Army	William Elder	1897–2005	BEF.
First Battle of the Isonzo	23 June 1915	Italian Royal Army	Carlo Orelli	1894–2005	
Landing at Suvla Bay	6 August 1915	British Army	Robert Richard Barron	1895–1999	MEF.
Battle of the Nek	7 August 1915	Australian Army	Leonard "Len" Hall	1897–1999	ANZAC.
Battle of Loos	25 September 1915	British Army	Alfred Anderson	1896–2005	
Serbian army's retreat through Albania	25 November 1915	Serbian Army	Aleksa Radovanović	1900–2004	
Battle of Verdun	21 February 1916	French Army	René Marie-Martial Moreau	1897–2005	
Battle of Columbus	9 March 1916	Villistas	Juan Carlos Caballero Vega	1900–2010	División del Norte.
Battle of Jutland	31 May 1916	British Royal Navy	Henry Allingham	1896–2009	Royal Naval Air Service. Served as a seaplane mechanic on the HMT Kingfisher.
Battle of Jutland	31 May 1916	British Royal Navy	Henry St John Fancourt	1900–2004	Served on HMS Princess Royal
Battle of Jutland	31 May 1916	Imperial German Navy	Willy Schinkel	1896–2002	Served on SMS Kaiser.
Storming of Fort Vaux	1 June 1916	French Army	Ferdinand Viviès	1895–1995	
Battle of the Somme	1 July 1916	French Army	Claude-Marie Boucaud	1895–2005	
Battle of the Somme	1 July 1916	British Army	Albert Marshall	1897–2005	
Battle of Delville Wood	14 July 1916	South African Army	Joeseph Samuels	1897–1998	SAOEF.
Battle of Pozières	23 July 1916	Australian Army	Marcel Caux	1899–2004	I ANZAC Corps
Battle of Bucharest	27 November 1916	Romanian Army	Titus Gârbea	1893–1998	
Second Battle of Kut	23 February 1917	Ottoman Army	Yakup Satar	1898–2008	
First Battle of Gaza	26 March 1917	Australian Army	McRae Archibald Cameron	1898–1997	I ANZAC Corps. ANZAC Mounted Division.
Bloody April	1 April 1917	British Army	Norman Baillie Lovemore	1895–1993	Royal Flying Corps.
Battle of Arras	9 April 1917	British Army	Albert Marshall	1897–2005	BEF.
Battle of Vimy Ridge	9 April 1917	British Army	Alfred Finnigan	1896–2005	BEF.
Battle of Vimy Ridge	9 April 1917	Canadian Army	Clifford Holliday	1898–2004	CEF.
Battle of Chemin des Dames	16 April 1917	French Army	Louis de Cazenave	1897–2008	
Second Battle of Gaza	17 April 1917	Australian Army	McRae Archibald Cameron	1898–1997	I ANZAC Corps. ANZAC Mounted Division.
Battle of Messines	7 June 1917	Australian Army	Edward Smout	1898–2004	RAAMC.
Battle of Messines	7 June 1917	New Zealand Army	Bright Williams	1897–2003	NZEF.
Battle of Zborov	1 July 1917	Imperial Russian Army	Alois Vocásek	1896–2003	Czechoslovak Legion.
Battle of Passchendaele	31 July 1917	British Army	Harry Patch	1898–2009	BEF.
Battle of Passchendaele	31 July 1917	New Zealand Army	Bright Williams	1897–2003	NZEF.
Battle of Mărășești	6 August 1917	Romanian Army	Dumitrașcu Lăcătușu	1891–1999	
Third Battle of Oituz	8 August 1917	Romanian Army	Dumitrașcu Lăcătușu	1891–1999	
Battle of Caporetto	24 October 1917	Italian Royal Army	Delfino Borroni	1898–2008	
Battle of Beersheba	31 October 1917	British Army	Jasper Cecil Hankinson	1896–2004	EEF.
Battle of Beersheba	31 October 1917	Australian Army	Leonard "Len" Hall	1897–1999	EEF. Desert Mounted Corps. Last participant of the Light Horse charge.
Third Battle of Gaza	1 November 1917	Australian Army	Albert Ernest Whitmore	1899–2002	EEF. Last Australian Light Horse veteran.
Battle of Hareira and Sheria	6 November 1917	British Army	Harold Judd	1898–1998	EEF.
Charge at Huj	8 November 1917	British Army	Darcy Harold Jones	1896–2000	EEF.
Battle of Monte Grappa	13 November 1917	Italian Royal Army	Lazare Ponticelli	1897–2008	
Battle of Jerusalem	17 November 1917	British Army	Jasper Cecil Hankinson	1896–2004	EEF.
Battle of Jerusalem	17 November 1917	Australian Army	Albert Ernest Whitmore	1899–2002	EEF. Desert Mounted Corps.
Battle of Cambrai	20 November 1917	British Army	Albert Marshall	1897–2005	BEF.
Battle of Cambrai	20 November 1917	British Army	Norman Margrave Dillon	1896–1997	Tank Corps.
Battle of Kruty	29/ 30 January 1918	Ukrainian People's Army	Matthew Danyluk	1892–1994	
Ice March	9 February 1918	Volunteer Army	Boris Mikhailovich Ivanov	1895–1993	
Steppe March	25 February 1918	Don Army	Nikolai Mikhailovich Pokhlebin	1901–1991	
Battle of the Lys	7 April 1918	Portuguese Army	José Maria Hermano Baptista	1895–2002	CEP.
Battle of Tampere	21 April 1918	Finnish White Army	Lauri Nurminen	1906–2009	
Zeebrugge Raid	23 April 1918	British Royal Navy	Sidney Hesse	1899–2002	Served on HMS Phoebe.
Zeebrugge Raid	23 April 1918	British Royal Navy	Alfred Ambrose Hutchinson	1895–2002	Royal Marines. Served on HMS Iris II.
Battle of Vyborg	21 April 1918	Finnish Red Army	Aarne Arvonen	1897–2009	
Second Battle of Jordan	30 April 1918	Australian Army	Albert Ernest Whitmore	1899–2002	EEF. Desert Mounted Corps.
Battle of Sardarabad	22 May 1918	Armenian Army	Senekerim "Sam" Arakelian	1902–2000	
Third Battle of the Aisne	27 May 1918	French Army	Ferdinand Gilson	1898–2006	
Third Battle of the Aisne	27 May 1918	British Army	Frank S. Deane	1899–2002	BEF.
Battle of Moreuil Wood	30 May 1918	Canadian Army	Frank E. Richmond	1896–1996	CEF.
Battle of Belleau Wood	1 June 1918	United States Marine Corps	William Eugene "Gene" Lee	1899–2004	5th Marine Regiment.
Kuban Offensive	9 June 1918	Volunteer Army	Boris Vitalyevich Pryanishnikov	1902–2002	
Second Battle of the Piave River	15 June 1918	Austro-Hungarian Army	Franz Künstler	1900–2008	
Second Battle of the Piave River	15 June 1918	Italian Royal Army	Domenico De Cristofaro	1899–2006	
Second Battle of the Marne	15 July 1918	French Army	Jean Grelaud	1898–2007	
Second Battle of the Marne	15 July 1918	Imperial German Army	Charles Kuentz	1897–2005	
Battle of Amiens	8 August 1918	Australian Army	Peter Casserly	1898–2005	AIF.
Second Battle of the Somme	21 August 1918	French Army	Ferdinand Gilson	1898–2005	
Second Battle of the Somme	21 August 1918	Australian Army	Edward "Ted" Rayns	1899–2004	Australian Corps.
Battle of Saint-Mihiel	12 September 1918	United States Army	Antonio Pierro	1896–2007	82nd Infantry Division
Capture of Damascus	1 October 1918	Australian Army	Albert Ernest Whitmore	1899–2002	EEF. Desert Mounted Corps.
Battle of Vittorio Veneto	3 November 1918	Italian Royal Army	Francesco Domenico Chiarello	1898–2008	
Capture of Le Quesnoy	4 November 1918	New Zealand Army	Lawrence Morris Blyth	1895–2001	NZEF.
Soloheadbeg Ambush	21 January 1919	Irish Republican Army	Pádraig Mac Cormaic	1894–1982	
Vilna offensive	16 April 1919	Polish Army	Walenty Florysiak	1898–2004	
Battle of Warsaw	12 August 1920	Polish Army	Józef Kowalski	1900–2013	
Battle of Radzymin	13 August 1920	Polish Army	Witold Bublewski	1904–2007	
Battle of Komarów	30 August 1920	Polish Army	Józef Kowalski	1900–2013	
Kilmichael Ambush	28 November 1920	Irish Republican Army	Edward "Ned" Young	1892–1989	
Kilmichael Ambush	28 November 1920	Royal Irish Constabulary	Frederick Henry Forde	1896–1941	Only RIC survivor of the ambush.
Second Battle of İnönü	23 March 1921	Turkish Army	Veysel Turan	1899–2007	
Battle of Sakarya	23 August 1921	Turkish Army	Yakup Satar	1898–2008	
Great Offensive	26 August 1922	Turkish Army	Mustafa Şekip Birgöl	1903–2008	
January 28 incident	28 January 1932	Chinese Army	Huang Shengyong	1905–2017	
Battle of Boquerón	7 September 1932	Paraguayan Army	Gabino Ayala	1913–2014	
Long March	16 October 1934	Chinese Red Army	Tu Tongjin	1914–2023	
Siege of the Montaña barracks	18 July 1936	Spanish Republican Army	Bibiano Morcillo	1915–2012	
Siege of the Alcázar	21 July 1936	Nationalist Army	Federico Fuentes Gómez de Salazar	1918–2018	
Battle of El Mazuco	6 September 1937	Spanish Republican militia	Antonio Batalla	1919–2018	Unified Socialist Youth.
Defense of Sihang Warehouse	26 October 1937	Chinese Army	Yang Yangzheng	1914–2010	Last of the "800 Heroes".
USS Panay incident	12 December 1937	Imperial Japanese Navy	Kaname Harada	1916–2016	Naval Air Service.
USS Panay incident	12 December 1937	United States Navy	Fon Huffman	1913–2008	Served on USS Panay.
Battle of Cape Palos	5 March 1938	Nationalist Navy	Manuel Aneiros Saavedra	1917–2020	Served on Baleares.
Battle of Cape Machichaco	5 March 1938	Basque Auxiliary Navy	Juan Azkarate	1922–2019	Served on Nabarra. Last survivor of the Basque Auxiliary Navy.
Battles of Khalkhin Gol	11 May 1939	Mongolian People's Army	Tserengiin Chimedtseren	1924	Served as a nurse.
Battle of Westerplatte	1 September 1939	Polish Army	Ignacy Skowron	1915–2012	
Battle of Mikołów	1 September 1939	Polish Army	Franciszek Grzegorzek	1919?–2014	
Battle of the River Plate	13 December 1939	New Zealand Royal Navy	John Richard Thomson	1922?–2021	Served on HMNZS Achilles.
Battle of the River Plate	13 December 1939	British Royal Navy	Basil Arthur Trott	1919–2021	Served on HMS Exeter.
Battle of the River Plate	13 December 1939	German Navy	Hans Eubel	1916–2017	Served on Admiral Graf Spee.
Battle for The Hague	10 May 1940	Dutch Royal Air Force	Jan Linzel	1915–2019	
Battle of Rotterdam	10 May 1940	Dutch Royal Navy	William "Bill" Ramakers	1922–2018	Last marine.
Battle of the Afsluitdijk	12 May 1940	Dutch Royal Army	Roelof Korporaal	1919–2014	
Battle of Britain	10 July 1940	British Royal Air Force	John Hemingway	1919–2025	Last pilot and last of The Few.
Battle of Britain	10 July 1940	British Royal Air Force	Paul Farnes	1918–2020	Last ace.
Capture of Kufra	31 January 1941	Free French Army	Daniel Paul Mathurin Nevot	1920–2019	
Battle of the Denmark Strait	24 May 1941	British Royal Navy	Ted Briggs	1923–2008	Served on HMS Hood.
Battle of the Denmark Strait	24 May 1941	German Navy	Bernhard Heuer	1922–2018	Served on Bismarck.
Sinking of the Bismarck	26 May 1941	German Navy	Bernhard Heuer	1922–2018	
Attack on Pearl Harbor	7 December 1941	Imperial Japanese Navy	Masamitsu Yoshioka	1918–2024	Naval Air Service. Last airman.
Attack on Pearl Harbor	7 December 1941	Imperial Japanese Navy	Kaname Harada	1916–2016	Naval Air Service. Last pilot.
Attack on Pearl Harbor	7 December 1941	United States Navy	Lou Conter	1921–2024	Last surviving crew member of the USS Arizona
Sinking of Prince of Wales and Repulse	10 December 1941	British Royal Marines	James Wren	1920–2026	Served on HMS Repulse
Raid on Alexandria	19 December 1941	Italian Royal Navy	Emilio Bianchi	1912–2015	
Battle of Pasir Panjang	12 February 1942	British Malayan Army	Ujang Mormin	1920–2021	
Bataan Death March	9–17 April 1942	United States Army Air Forces	James Bollich	1921	27th Bombardment Group, 16th Squadron.
Doolittle Raid	18 April 1942	United States Army Air Forces	Richard E. Cole	1915–2019	17th Bombardment Group.
Battle of Bir Hakeim	26 May 1942	(Free France) Free French Forces	Paul Leterrier	1921–2025	Last surviving French veteran of the battle.
Defense of Pavlov's House	27 September 1942	Soviet Army	Kamoljon Turgunov	1921–2015	
Operation Frankton	7–12 December 1942	British Royal Navy	Bill Sparks	1922–2002	
Warsaw Ghetto Uprising	19 April 1943	Jewish Combat Organization	Aliza Melamed Vitis-Shomron	1928	Last participant.
Warsaw Ghetto Uprising	19 April 1943	Jewish Combat Organization	Michael Smuss	1926–2025	Last known combatant.
Operation Chastise	16 May 1943	British Royal Air Force	Johnny Johnson	1921–2022	
Operation Jaywick	26 September 1943	Australian Royal Navy	Mostyn "Moss" Berryman	1923–2020	Z Special Unit.
Battle of Peleliu	15 September 1944	Imperial Japanese Army	Keiji Nagai	1921–2019	
Liberation of Auschwitz concentration camp	27 January 1945	Soviet Army	Ivan Martynushkin	1923	
Georgian uprising on Texel	20 May 1945	Georgian Legion rebels	Grigor Baindurashvili	1918?–2021	

== See also ==
- List of last surviving veterans of military insurgencies and wars
- Last European veterans by war
- Last surviving United States war veterans
- List of last surviving Canadian war veterans
- List of last surviving World War I veterans by country
