= Last surviving Confederate veterans =

In Lee's Last Retreat: The Flight to Appomattox, historian William Marvel identified Private Pleasant Riggs Crump, of Talladega County, Alabama, who died December 31, 1951, as the last confirmed surviving veteran of the Confederate States Army. Citing English professor and biographical researcher Dr. Jay S. Hoar, Marvel states that after Crump's death a dozen other men claimed to have been Confederate soldiers, but military, pension, and especially census records prove they were impostors. Marvel further wrote that the names of two other supposed Confederate survivors alive in April 1950, according to Hoar, are not on the Appomattox parole lists and one, perhaps both, of their Confederate service claims were faked. An extensively researched book by Frank L. Gryzb, The Last Civil War Veterans: The Lives of the Final Survivors State by State, published March 29, 2016, supports the conclusion by Hoar, Marvel, Serrano and others that Pleasant Crump was the last confirmed and verified surviving veteran of the Confederate States Army.

Following the entry in the table below for Pleasant Crump is a list of the discredited or unproven Confederate veteran claimants who died after Crump's death.

== Table of last survivors ==
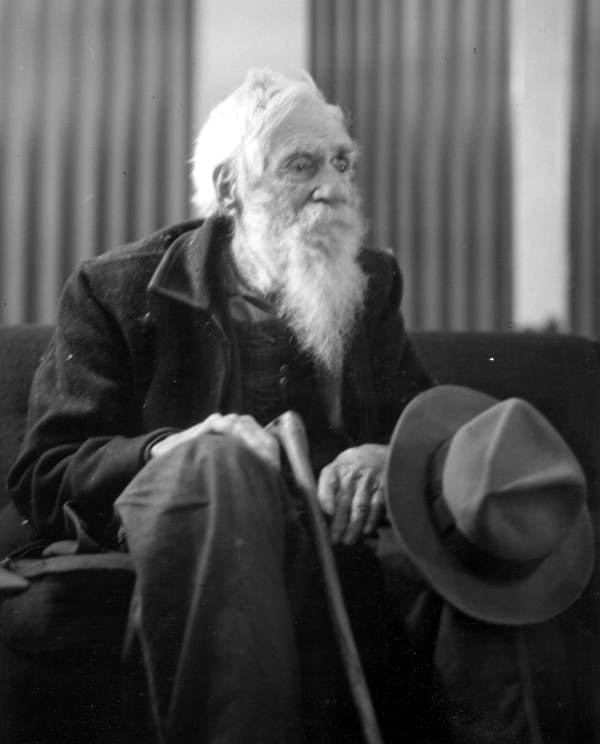
William "Uncle Bill" Lundy

Name	Claimed birth date	Believed birth date	Death date
Pleasant Crump	23 December 1847		31 December 1951
Felix M. Witkoski	5 January 1850	October 1854	3 February 1952
Thomas Edwin Ross	19 July 1850		27 March 1952
Richard William Cumpston	23 May 1841		5 September 1952
William Loudermilk	23 October 1848	April 1851	18 September 1952
William Jordan Bush	10 July 1845	July 1850	11 November 1952
Arnold Murray	10 June 1846	1854/1855	26 November 1952
William Townsend	12 April 1846		22 February 1953
William Albert Kinney	10 February 1843	10 February 1861	23 June 1953
Thomas Riddle	16 April 1846	1862	2 April 1954
William Lundy	18 January 1848	May 1860	1 September 1957
John B. Salling	15 May 1846	15 May 1856	16 March 1959
Walter Williams	14 November 1842	14 November 1854	19 December 1959

On December 19, 1959, Walter Washington Williams (sometimes referred to as Walter G. Williams), reputed near the time of his death to be the last surviving veteran of the Confederate States Army, died in Houston, Texas. Williams's status as the last Confederate veteran already had been debunked by a September 3, 1959 story in the New York Times by Lloyd K. Bridwell. In his 1991 article in Blue and Gray magazine entitled The Great Imposters, William Marvel gave further details, including census records from before his 1932 Confederate pension application, showing Williams's birth as having occurred between October 1854 and April 1855 in Itawamba County, Mississippi. Those records showed he was too young to have served in the Confederate Army. Also, he did not identify himself as a Confederate veteran in the 1910 census which included a question about whether a person had that status. Nonetheless, since all the other claimants were dead, Williams was celebrated as the last Confederate veteran after his death on December 19, 1959.

When Williams's status was disproved, attention turned to the alleged second longest surviving Confederate veteran, John B. Salling of Slant in Scott County, Virginia. Marvel also showed that Salling had been too young to have served in the Confederate Army. In a post on the Library of Virginia blog on October 6, 2010, Craig Moore, Virginia State Records Appraisal Archivist, wrote that when Salling applied for a pension in 1933, Pension Clerk John H. Johnson could not find a war record for Salling at the Library of Virginia, which held the records of the Department of Confederate Military Records. Salling received a pension after providing a notarized statement attesting to his service. Moore wrote that Marvel had found census records which put Salling's birth date in 1858. After stating Marvel's finding, Moore concluded that although existing Confederate pension records do not confirm or deny Salling's claim, the Commonwealth of Virginia accepted his claimed status.

In the Blue & Gray article, Marvel wrote, "Every one of the last dozen recognized Confederates was bogus. Thomas Riddle was only five when the Confederacy collapsed, and Arnold Murray only nine. William Loudermilk, who insisted he fought through the Atlanta Campaign at 16, did not turn 14 until after Appomattox. William Bush and a reputed Confederate nurse named Sarah Rockwell were not 20 years old in the summer of 1865, but 15."

The motive for fabrications of Confederate Army service almost always was to support a claim for a veteran's pension during the hard times of the Great Depression.

In his 1991 article in Blue & Gray magazine, Marvel confirmed Albert Woolson's (February 11, 1850 – August 2, 1956) claim to be the last surviving Union Army veteran and asserted that Woolson was the last genuine surviving American Civil War veteran from either side. On October 10, 1864, Albert enlisted in Company C, 1st Minnesota Heavy Artillery Regiment, becoming the company's drummer. However, the company never saw action, and Albert Woolson was discharged on September 7, 1865. Union Army veteran James Albert Hard (July 15, 1843 – March 12, 1953) was the last verified surviving American Civil War veteran who was in combat.
