= Yakup Satar =

Ottoman veteran of the First World War

- Born: 11 March 1898; Crimea, Russian Empire
- Died: 2 April 2008 (aged 110 years, 22 days)
- Military career
- Allegiance: Ottoman Empire; Turkey
- Service years: 1915–1923
- Conflicts: World War I; Second Battle of Kut (POW); Turkish War of Independence

Yakup Satar (Ottoman Turkish: یعقوب ستر; 11 March 1898 – 2 April 2008) was a Turkish and Ottoman soldier who is believed to have been the last Ottoman veteran of the First World War. He died at age 110.

Born in Crimea, Satar joined the army of the Ottoman Empire in 1915. On 23 February 1917, he was taken prisoner by the British in the Baghdad campaign's Second Battle of Kut. Freed after the end of the war, Satar then served in the forces of Mustafa Kemal Atatürk in the Turkish War of Independence, which lasted from 1919 to 1923.

Shortly before his 110th birthday, he was treated for a minor infection at a military hospital before being released home, where he lived with his daughter in the Seyitgazi district of Eskişehir. He died soon after turning 110.

His memories from the War of Independence and his daily life along with those of two other veterans, Ömer Küyük and Veysel Turan, are depicted in the documentary film Son Buluşma (2007) (English: The Last Meeting) by Nesli Çölgeçen.

== See also ==
- Crimean Tatars
- List of last surviving World War I veterans
- Mustafa Şekip Birgöl, last veteran of the Turkish War of Independence
- Muazzez İlmiye Çığ, a Turkish Sumerologist and fellow supercentenarian
