= Son Buluşma =

- Directed by: Nesli Çölgeçen
- Written by: Nesli Çölgeçen
- Starring: Ömer Küyük; Veysel Turan; Yakup Satar
- Production company: Plan Prodüksiyon
- Distributed by: Chantier Films
- Release date: November 14, 2008 (Çorum)
- Country: Turkey
- Language: Turkish

Son Buluşma (English: The Last Meeting) is a Turkish documentary film produced in 2007 and directed by Nesli Çölgeçen. The film depicts the memoires and the daily life of the three last veterans of the Turkish War of Independence, Ömer Küyük, Veysel Turan and Yakup Satar.

The last witnesses of the war of independence (1919–1923) tell their memories. "Nişancı Er Ömer" (English: Marksman Private Ömer) from Çorum pays first a visit to his commander, Mustafa Kemal Atatürk, at Anıtkabir in Ankara. He then travels to meet his comrades, "Sıhhiyeci Onbaşı Veysel" (English: Combat Medic Corporal Veysel) in Konya and "Süvari Yakup" (English: Cavalryman Yakup) in Eskişehir. At the time of the film shooting in 2006, Ömer Küyük was 106 years of age, Veysel Turan 105 and Yakup Satar 108. In the film, they remember the wartime and say farewell to each other.

Not long after the material for the documentary was filmed, all three veterans died, Ömer Küyük on January 13, 2006, Veysel Turan on March 25, 2007, and Yakup Satar on April 2, 2008. No one of them was able to watch the premiere held on November 14, 2008, in Çorum, the hometown of Ömer Küyük. The screenwriter and director of the documentary film, Nesli Çölgeçen, was not aware of another veteran of the independence war, retired Colonel Mustafa Şekip Birgöl, who died as the last veteran on November 11, 2008, in Istanbul at the age of 105.
