= Ömer Küyük =

Turkish veteran (1900–2006)

Ömer Küyük (1900 – 12 January 2006) was one of the last Turkish veterans of the Turkish War of Independence (1919–1923).

Called Turkish: Nişancı Er Ömer, he fought in the Independence War as a marksman private.

He lived in the small town of Iskilip in Çorum Province, and died on January 12, 2006, at the age of 106.

His memories from the War of Independence and his daily life along with those of two other veterans, Veysel Turan and Yakup Satar, are depicted in the documentary film Son Buluşma (2007) (English: The Last Meeting) by Nesli Çölgeçen.
