= Albert Woolson =

American Civil War Union Army drummer and last surviving Union veteran

Albert Henry Woolson
- Woolson at about age 102 or 103
- Born: Henry Albert Woolson; February 11, 1850; Antwerp, New York, U.S.
- Died: August 2, 1956 (aged 106); Duluth, Minnesota, U.S.
- Burial place: Park Hill Cemetery, Duluth, Minnesota
- Military career
- Allegiance: United States
- Branch: Union Army
- Service years: 1864–1865
- Rank: Drummer boy
- Unit: 1st Minnesota Heavy Artillery Regiment
- Conflicts: American Civil War
- Memorials: Monument at Gettysburg
- Other work: Carpenter; member of the Grand Army of the Republic

Albert Henry Woolson (February 11, 1850 – August 2, 1956) was an American Union Army drummer who served during the American Civil War. He is generally regarded as the last surviving Union Army veteran of the war and, following his death, as the last surviving Civil War veteran whose military service was undisputed.

At least three men who outlived Woolson claimed to have been Confederate veterans. One of these claims was subsequently disproven, while the other two remain unverified. The last surviving Union veteran known to have seen combat was James Hard (1843–1953).

== Biography ==
Woolson was born in Antwerp, New York, to Willard P. Woolson (1811–1862) and Caroline Baldwin (1823–1909). He claimed to be born on February 11, 1847, but his entry in the 1850 United States census lists him as born in 1850. Entries in the later census records and in the 1905 Minnesota state census support the conclusion that he was born in 1850.

His father, Willard Woolson, enlisted in the Union Army. Willard was wounded at the Battle of Shiloh and was transported to an Army hospital in Windom, Minnesota, where he would die of his wounds. Albert and his mother had moved to Windom to accompany Willard. Albert enlisted as a drummer boy in Company C, 1st Minnesota Heavy Artillery Regiment on October 10, 1864, becoming the company's drummer. However, the company never saw action, and Albert Woolson was discharged on September 7, 1865.

Woolson returned to Minnesota, where he lived the rest of his life. He was a carpenter and later a member of the Grand Army of the Republic (G.A.R.), a powerful political organization made up of Civil War veterans where he became senior vice commander in chief in 1953.

In his final days, he lived at 215 East Fifth Street in Duluth, Minnesota. Woolson died at St. Luke's Hospital in Duluth on August 2, 1956, at what was then thought to be the age of 109, of a "recurring lung congestion condition". He was twice widowed and was survived by six daughters and two sons. Woolson was buried with full military honors by the National Guard at Park Hill Cemetery.

Following his death, President Dwight D. Eisenhower said:

The American people have lost the last personal link with the Union Army ... His passing brings sorrow to the hearts of all of us who cherished the memory of the brave men on both sides of the War Between the States.

== Legacy ==
Woolson and fellow drummer boy Frank Mayer marched together, both aged 99, in the Memorial Day Parade in May 1949, to lay a wreath at the tomb of General Grant in New York City.

Life magazine ran a seven-page article upon the death of Albert Woolson, in the August 20, 1956, issue. The article included much information about the G.A.R., with pictures or drawings of several encampments (conventions). Also included were photos of the last three living Confederate soldiers (status and age disputed): William Lundy, 108; Walter Williams, 113; and John Salling, 110.

In mid-2006, new census research indicated that Albert Woolson was actually 106 years old, being listed as less than one year old in the 1850 census. Previous research in 1991 had suggested he was only a year younger than claimed (108 instead of 109), although this does not affect his veteran status.

After his death, the Grand Army of the Republic was dissolved because Woolson was its last surviving member.

Some of Woolson's artifacts are on display at the Veterans Memorial Hall gallery, a program of St. Louis County Historical Society, in the St. Louis County Depot in downtown Duluth, Minnesota.

The 2011–2012 Minnesota Legislative Manual was dedicated to him.

In 1956, a monument of Woolson was erected in Gettysburg as a memorial to the Grand Army of the Republic. A twin statue is on display outside the St. Louis County Depot in downtown Duluth, Minnesota.

== Images ==
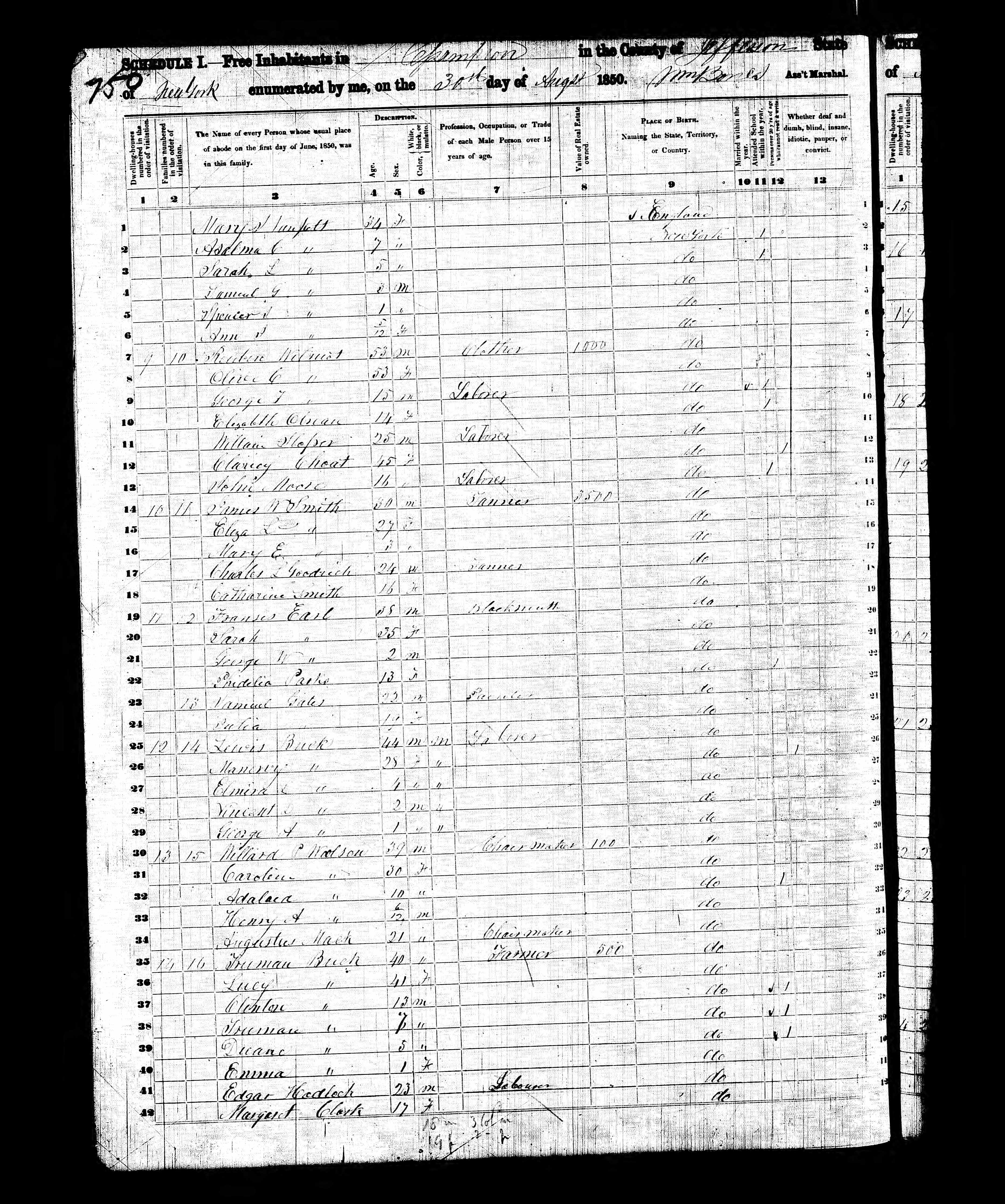
Woolson as "Henry Albert Woolson" in the 1850 census as a newborn

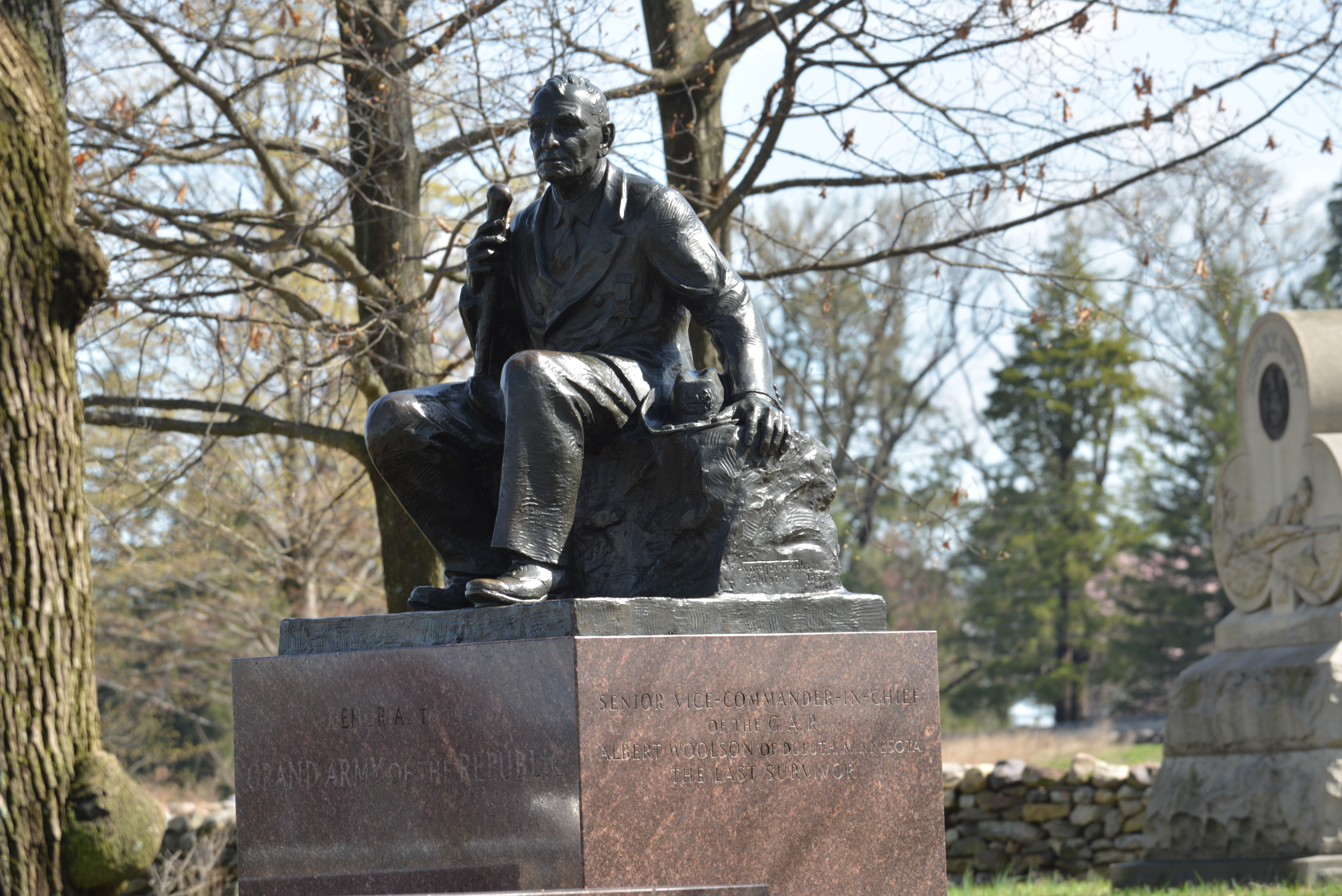
Statue of Albert Woolson at Gettysburg National Military Park

== See also ==
- 1st Minnesota Heavy Artillery Regiment
- Last surviving United States war veterans
- Pleasant Crump, last surviving Confederate veteran of the same Civil War
- Samuel J. Seymour
