= Pleasant Crump =

American Confederate soldier and last verified Confederate Civil War veteran

Pleasant Riggs Crump
- Born: Pleasant Riggs Crump; December 23, 1847; St. Clair County, Alabama, U.S.
- Died: December 31, 1951 (aged 104); Lincoln, Alabama, U.S.
- Burial place: Hall Cemetery, Lincoln, Alabama, U.S.
- Military career
- Allegiance: Confederate States of America
- Branch: Confederate States Army
- Service years: 1864–1865
- Rank: Private
- Unit: 10th Alabama Infantry Regiment
- Conflicts: American Civil War: Siege of Petersburg; Battle of Hatcher's Run

Pleasant Riggs Crump (December 23, 1847 – December 31, 1951) was an American soldier who served in the Confederate States Army during the American Civil War. He is generally regarded as the last surviving Confederate veteran whose military service has been verified. Crump served as a private in the 10th Alabama Infantry Regiment from 1864 to 1865.

Although several other men claimed to have been Confederate veterans and survived Crump, including William Lundy, John B. Salling, and Walter Williams, subsequent historical research found their claims to be unsupported or otherwise disputed. Crump died in Lincoln, Alabama, on December 31, 1951, at the age of 104.

== Life and career ==
Born in Crawford's Cove, St. Clair County, Alabama, Crump and a friend left home and traveled to Petersburg, Virginia, where Crump enlisted as a private in the 10th Alabama Infantry Regiment in November 1864. Assigned to Company A, Crump saw action at the Battle of Hatcher's Run, and participated in the siege of Petersburg before witnessing General Robert E. Lee's surrender at Appomattox Court House to Union General Ulysses S. Grant.

Returning home to rural Alabama, Crump soon relocated to Lincoln, in nearby Talladega County. There, at the age of 22, he married a local woman named Mary Hall. They had five children from their marriage, which lasted until she died on December 31, 1901. Crump later married Ella Wallis of Childersburg in 1905. After her death in July 1942, he lived with a grandson's family.

The United Confederate Veterans awarded Crump the honorary title of colonel in its organization. In 1950, he met with 98-year-old "General" James Moore, who was recognized as the only other Confederate veteran remaining in Alabama.

Crump died shortly after his 104th birthday, exactly fifty years after his first wife, Mary Hall died. He is buried in Hall Cemetery, in Lincoln.

== See also ==
- Albert Woolson
- Last surviving United States war veterans
