= Christmas Eve truce of 1944 =

Christmas Eve truce during the Battle of the Bulge in 1944

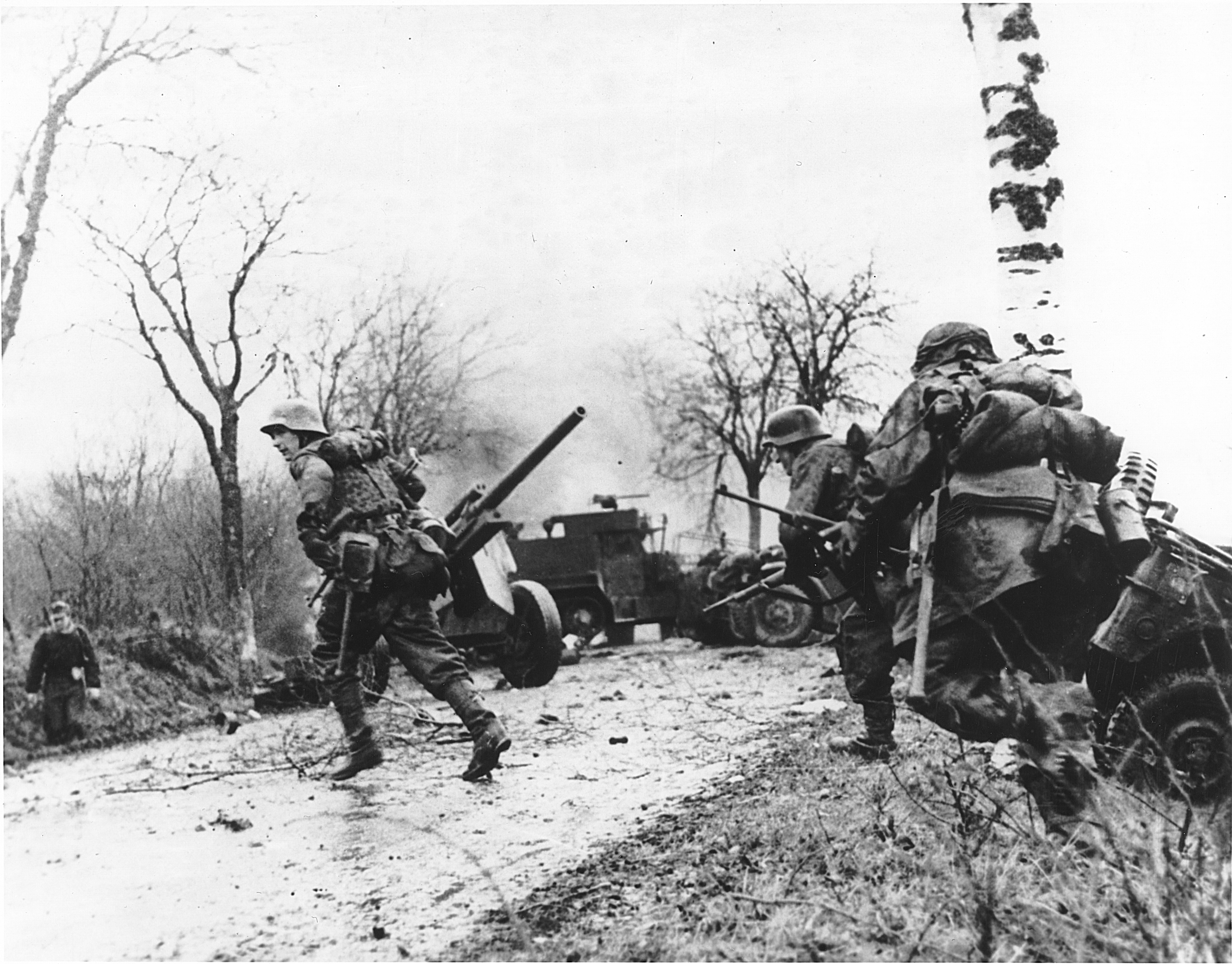
The Battle of the Bulge in 1944

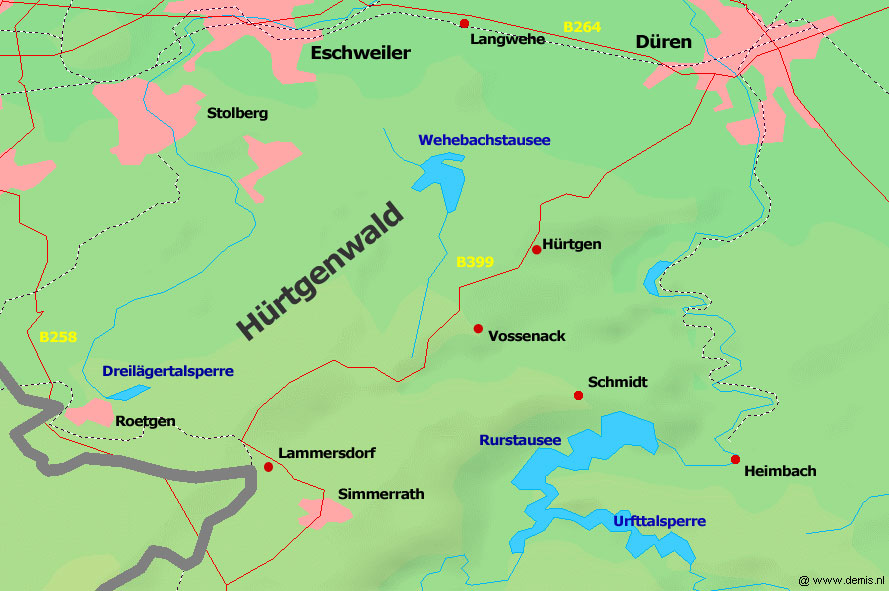
Map of the Huertgen Forest

Truce in the Forest, also known as the Christmas Eve truce of 1944, was an informal ceasefire between American and German soldiers during World War II, said to have occurred on Christmas Eve of 1944 in the Hürtgen Forest during the Battle of the Bulge. The incident was described in a later account by Fritz Vincken, who as a child reportedly witnessed the event in a remote cabin near the German–Belgian border.

This truce was actually a temporary suspension of hostilities during which opposing soldiers shared shelter, food, and medical assistance under the direction of a German civilian woman - a mother. While widely circulated in popular histories and media, the episode is based primarily on retrospective testimony and is not extensively documented in contemporaneous military records.

== Background ==
In December 1944, German forces launched a major offensive through the Ardennes region, initiating the Battle of the Bulge, the last significant German offensive on the Western Front. The fighting took place in harsh winter conditions, with widespread confusion, heavy casualties, and dislocated units on both sides.

The truce is said to have occurred in the Hürtgen Forest area, near the border between Germany and Belgium, where isolated groups of soldiers were cut off from their units.

== Account ==
The incident was later recounted by Fritz Vincken, who stated that he was 12 years old at the time and living with his mother in a forest cabin after their home in Aachen had been damaged by bombing.

According to the account, on the evening of 24 December 1944, three American soldiers —one of them wounded— approached the cabin seeking shelter. Vincken's mother allowed them inside and began treating the injured soldier. Later that evening, four German soldiers arrived at the cabin and requested refuge only for one night as they had been lost in the forest.

Vincken's mother reportedly insisted that no fighting would take place inside the home and required all soldiers to surrender their weapons before entering. Both groups complied. The soldiers then shared a meal prepared by the woman, consisting of a slaughtered rooster and potatoes, and spent the night together.

The account further states that a German soldier with medical training treated the wounded American. The group observed a moment of silence on Christmas Eve and remained in an informal truce overnight. The following morning, the German corporal allegedly provided directions to the American soldiers to help them return to their lines, after which the groups parted away.

== Sources and publication ==
The story became more widely known after Fritz Vincken recounted it publicly in the 1970s. It has since been republished in various articles, sermons, and historical retrospectives.

The event has been described in publications such as newspaper features and online historical essays, including a 2012 article in The Washington Post that discussed similar wartime anecdotes.

== Historical assessment ==
Unlike the well-documented Christmas truce of 1914 during World War I, the 1944 incident is not widely corroborated by official military records. Historians generally regard the story as plausible but anecdotal, relying primarily on a single eyewitness narrative given decades after the event.

Some researchers note that conditions during the Battle of the Bulge were such that several isolated units existed and communication broke down. However, the lack of independent verification has led to cautious treatment of the story in academic histories.

This event has been shared in popular culture as a good example of compassion and real humanity among enemies, especially during the wartime. The story has also been adapted into books, short films, and educational materials, often emphasizing its moral and symbolic significance.

== See also ==
- Christmas truce
- Battle of the Bulge
- Hürtgen Forest
- Truce in the Forest (film of 1977)
