= Bertie Felstead =

British soldier and WWI veteran

- Born: 28 October 1894; London, England
- Died: 22 July 2001 (aged 106); Gloucester, England
- Military career
- Allegiance: United Kingdom
- Branch: British Army
- Unit: Royal Welsh Fusiliers
- Conflicts: First World War: Battle of the Somme

Bertie Felstead (28 October 1894 – 22 July 2001) was a British soldier, World War I veteran and centenarian who gained fame at the end of his life as (or was believed so at the time to be) the last surviving soldier to have taken part in the Christmas truce of 1914.

Felstead, who was born in London in October 1894, was called to action earlier in 1914 and went to the battlefields of France with the 15th (London Welsh) Battalion, Royal Welsh Fusiliers. On Christmas Day that year, he took part in the famous truce with German soldiers which took place in the form of Christmas songs and then a game of football. The battalion was stationed in the trenches near a village west of Lille.

Felstead was discharged in 1916 after sustaining an injury at the Battle of the Somme. After demobilisation he worked as a civilian at RAF Uxbridge, and later with the General Electric Company.

He died in July 2001 aged 106 at an old people's home in Gloucester. After his death, he was reported to be the last surviving veteran of the truce. His death also made the News of the World Football Annual's obituary section when it was published a year later, a rare occurrence for someone who was never employed in football or football journalism.

After Felstead's death, however, it was reported that Alfred Anderson (another participant of the truce) was still living. Anderson died on 21 November 2005 aged 109. The last known World War I veteran to have fought in the trenches (Englishman Harry Patch) died on 25 July 2009 aged 111, and the last World War I veteran of any kind from any country (Florence Green) died on 4 February 2012 aged 110.
