= Christmas truce =

Informal ceasefires along the Western Front of WWI

The Christmas Truce
- Part of the First World War
- Soldiers from both sides (the British and the German) exchange cheerful conversation (an artist's impression from The Illustrated London News of 9 January 1915: "British and German Soldiers Arm-in-Arm Exchanging Headgear: A Christmas Truce between Opposing Trenches").
- Date: 24–26 December 1914
- Location: Europe
- Participants: Soldiers from: United Kingdom; France; Austria-Hungary; German Empire; Russian Empire
- Outcome: Temporary informal ceasefires in Europe

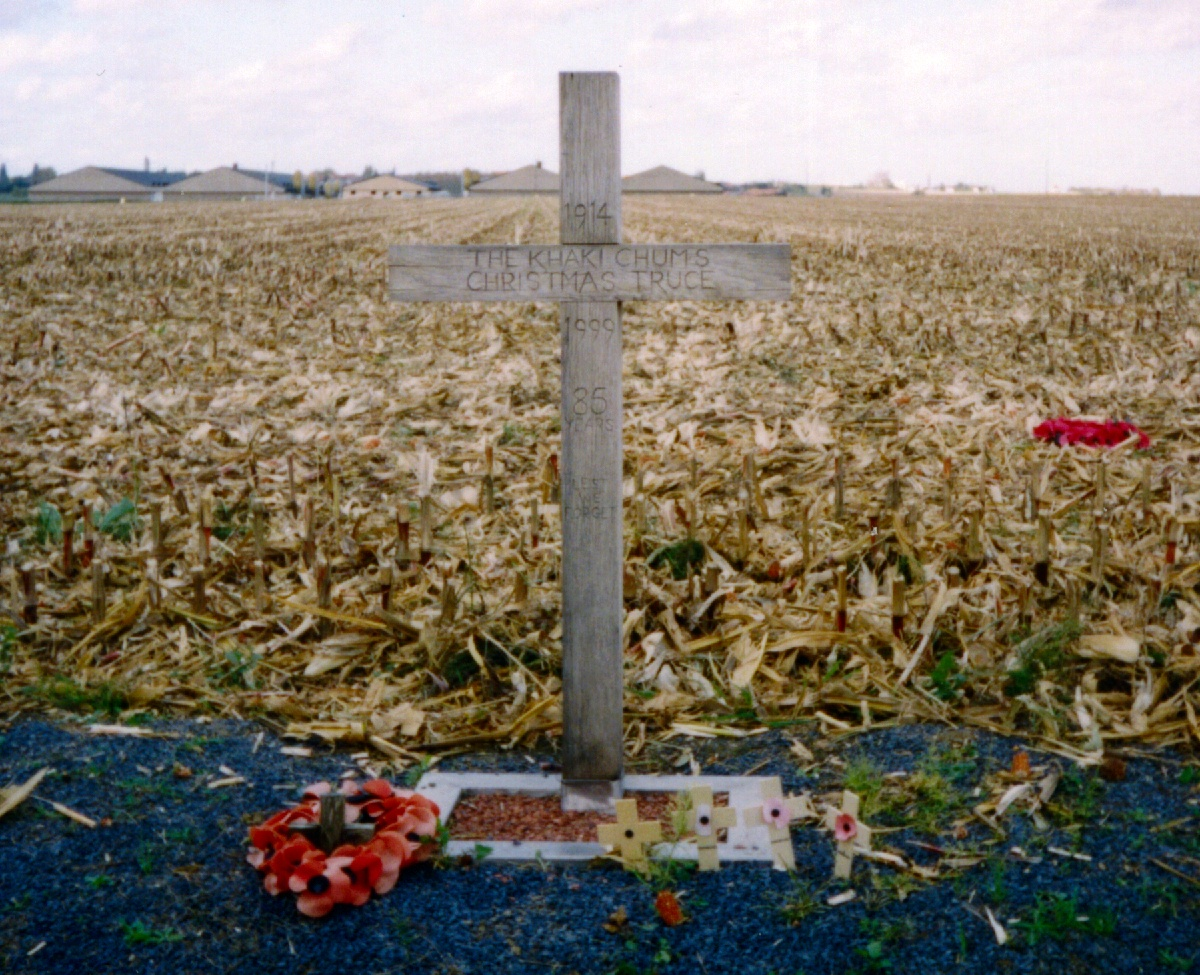
A cross, left in Saint-Yves (Saint-Yvon – Ploegsteert; Comines-Warneton in Belgium) in 1999, to commemorate the site of the Christmas Truce. The text reads: "1914 – The Khaki Chums Christmas Truce – 1999 – 85 Years – Lest We Forget".

The Christmas truce was a series of widespread unofficial ceasefires mainly along the Western Front of the First World War around Christmas in 1914.

The truce occurred five months after hostilities had begun. Lulls occurred in the fighting as armies ran out of men and munitions and commanders reconsidered their strategies following the stalemate of the Race to the Sea and the indecisive result of the First Battle of Ypres. In the week leading up to 25 December, French, German, and British soldiers crossed trenches to exchange seasonal greetings and talk. In some areas, men from both sides ventured into no man's land on Christmas Eve and Christmas Day to mingle and exchange food and souvenirs. There were joint burial ceremonies and prisoner swaps, while several meetings ended in carolling. They also played football against each other. Hostilities continued in some sectors, while in others the sides settled on little more than arrangements to recover bodies.

The following year, a few units arranged ceasefires, but the truces were not nearly as widespread as in 1914; this was, in part, due to strongly worded orders from commanders, prohibiting truces. Subsequently, soldiers themselves became less amenable to truce by 1916; the war had become increasingly bitter after the human losses suffered during the battles of 1915.

The truces were not unique to the Christmas period and reflected a mood of "live and let live", where infantry close together would stop fighting and fraternise, engaging in conversation. In some sectors, there were occasional ceasefires to allow soldiers to go between the lines and recover wounded or dead comrades; in others, there was a tacit agreement not to shoot while men rested, exercised or worked in view of the enemy. The Christmas truces were particularly significant due to the number of men involved and the level of their participation—even in quiet sectors, dozens of men openly congregating in daylight was remarkable—and are often seen as a symbolic moment of peace and humanity amidst one of the most violent conflicts in human history.

== Background ==
During the first eight weeks of World War I, French and British troops stopped the German attack through Belgium into France outside Paris at the First Battle of the Marne in early September 1914. The Germans fell back to the Aisne valley, where they dug in. In the First Battle of the Aisne, the Franco–British attacks were repulsed and both sides began digging trenches to economise on manpower and use the surplus to outflank, to the north, their opponents. In the Race to the Sea, the two sides made reciprocal outflanking manoeuvres and after several weeks, during which the British forces were withdrawn from the Aisne and sent north to Flanders, both sides ran out of room. By November, armies had built continuous lines of trenches running from the North Sea to the Swiss frontier.

Before Christmas 1914, there were several peace initiatives. The Open Christmas Letter was a public message for peace addressed "To the Women of Germany and Austria", signed by a group of 101 British women's suffragettes at the end of 1914. Pope Benedict XV, on 7 December 1914, had begged for an official truce between the warring governments. He asked "that the guns may fall silent at least upon the night the angels sang", which was refused by both sides.

== Fraternisation ==
Fraternisation—peaceful and sometimes friendly interactions between opposing forces—was a regular feature in quiet sectors of the Western Front. In some areas, both sides would refrain from aggressive behaviour, while in other cases it extended to regular conversation or even visits from one trench to another. On the Eastern Front, Fritz Kreisler reported incidents of spontaneous truces and fraternisation between the Austro-Hungarians and Russians in the first few weeks of the war.

Truces between British and German units can be dated to early November 1914, around the time that the war of manoeuvre ended. Rations were brought up to the front line after dusk and soldiers on both sides noted a period of peace while they collected their food. By December 1st, a British soldier could record a friendly visit from a German sergeant one morning "to see how we were getting on". Relations between French and German units were generally more tense but the same phenomenon began to emerge. In early December, a German surgeon recorded a regular half-hourly truce each evening to recover dead soldiers for burial, during which French and German soldiers exchanged newspapers. This behaviour was often challenged by officers; lieutenant Charles de Gaulle wrote on December 7th of the "lamentable" desire of French infantrymen to leave the enemy in peace, while the commander of 10th Army, Victor d'Urbal, wrote of the "unfortunate consequences" when men "become familiar with their neighbours opposite". Other truces could be forced on both sides by bad weather, especially when trench lines flooded and these often lasted after the weather had cleared.

The proximity of trench lines made it easy for soldiers to shout greetings to each other. This may have been the most common method of arranging informal truces in 1914. Men would frequently exchange news or greetings, helped by a common language; many German soldiers had lived in England, particularly London, and were familiar with the language and the society. Several British soldiers recorded instances of Germans asking about news from the football leagues, while other conversations could be as banal as discussions of the weather or as plaintive as messages for a sweetheart. One unusual phenomenon that grew in intensity was music; in peaceful sectors, it was not uncommon for units to sing in the evenings, sometimes deliberately with an eye towards entertaining or gently taunting their opposite numbers. This shaded gently into more festive activity; in early December, Sir Edward Hulse of the Scots Guards wrote that he was planning to organise a concert party for Christmas Day, which would "give the enemy every conceivable form of song in harmony" in response to frequent choruses of Deutschland Über Alles.

== Christmas 1914 ==
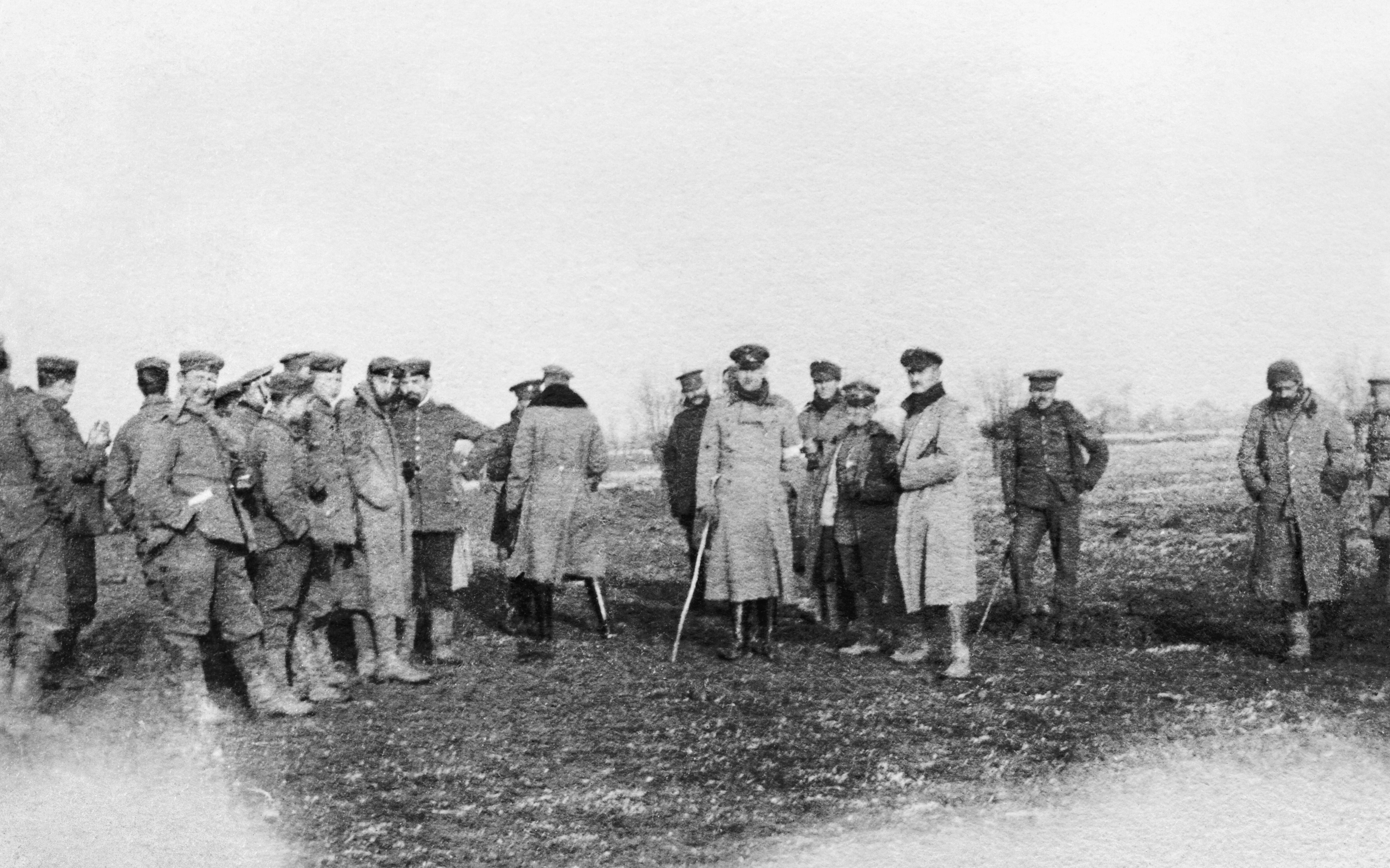
British and German troops meeting in no man's land during the unofficial truce (British troops from the Northumberland Hussars, 7th Division, Bridoux–Rouge Banc Sector).

Roughly 100,000 British and German troops were involved in the informal cessations of hostility along the Western Front. The Germans placed candles on their trenches and on Christmas trees, then continued the celebration by singing Christmas carols. The British responded by singing carols of their own.

The two sides continued by shouting Christmas greetings to each other. Soon thereafter, there were excursions across No Man's Land, where small gifts were exchanged, such as food, tobacco, alcohol, and souvenirs such as buttons and hats. The artillery in the region fell silent. The truce also allowed a breathing spell during which recently killed soldiers could be brought back behind their lines by burial parties. Joint services were held. In many sectors the truce lasted through Christmas night, continuing until New Year's Day in others.

On Christmas Day, Brigadier-General Walter Congreve, commander of the 18th Infantry Brigade, stationed near Neuve Chapelle, wrote a letter recalling that the Germans declared a truce for the day. One of his men bravely lifted his head above the parapet and others from both sides walked onto no man's land. Officers and men shook hands and exchanged cigarettes and cigars; one of his captains "smoked a cigar with the best shot in the German army", the latter no more than 18 years old. Congreve admitted he was reluctant to witness the truce for fear of German snipers.

Bruce Bairnsfather, who fought throughout the war, wrote:

I wouldn't have missed that unique and weird Christmas Day for anything.... I spotted a German officer, some sort of lieutenant I should think, and being a bit of a collector, I intimated to him that I had taken a fancy to some of his buttons.... I brought out my wire clippers and, with a few deft snips, removed a couple of his buttons and put them in my pocket. I then gave him two of mine in exchange.... The last I saw was one of my machine gunners, who was a bit of an amateur hairdresser in civil life, cutting the unnaturally long hair of a docile Boche, who was patiently kneeling on the ground whilst the automatic clippers crept up the back of his neck.

Henry Williamson, a nineteen-year-old private in the London Rifle Brigade, wrote to his mother on Boxing Day:

Dear Mother, I am writing from the trenches. It is 11 o'clock in the morning. Beside me is a coke fire, opposite me a 'dug-out' (wet) with straw in it. The ground is sloppy in the actual trench, but frozen elsewhere. In my mouth is a pipe presented by the Princess Mary. In the pipe is tobacco. Of course, you say. But wait. In the pipe is German tobacco. Haha, you say, from a prisoner or found in a captured trench. Oh dear, no! From a German soldier. Yes a live German soldier from his own trench. Yesterday the British & Germans met & shook hands in the Ground between the trenches, & exchanged souvenirs, & shook hands. Yes, all day Xmas day, & as I write. Marvellous, isn't it?

Captain Sir Edward Hulse reported how the first interpreter he met from the German lines was from Suffolk and had left his girlfriend and a 3.5 hp motorcycle. Hulse described a sing-song which "ended up with 'Auld lang syne' which we all, English, Scots, Irish, Prussians, Württenbergers, etc, joined in. It was absolutely astounding, and if I had seen it on a cinematograph film I should have sworn that it was faked!"

Captain Robert Miles, King's Shropshire Light Infantry, who was attached to the Royal Irish Rifles, recalled in an edited letter that was published in the Daily Mail and the Wellington Journal & Shrewsbury News in January 1915, following his death in action on 30 December 1914:

Friday (Christmas Day). We are having the most extraordinary Christmas Day imaginable. A sort of unarranged and quite unauthorized but perfectly understood and scrupulously observed truce exists between us and our friends in front. The funny thing is it only seems to exist in this part of the battle line – on our right and left we can all hear them firing away as cheerfully as ever. The thing started last night – a bitter cold night, with white frost – soon after dusk when the Germans started shouting 'Merry Christmas, Englishmen' to us. Of course our fellows shouted back and presently large numbers of both sides had left their trenches, unarmed, and met in the debatable, shot-riddled, no man's land between the lines. Here the agreement – all on their own – came to be made that we should not fire at each other until after midnight tonight. The men were all fraternizing in the middle (we naturally did not allow them too close to our line) and swapped cigarettes and lies in the utmost good fellowship. Not a shot was fired all night.

Of the Germans he wrote: "They are distinctly bored with the war.... In fact, one of them wanted to know what on earth we were doing here fighting them." The truce in that sector continued into Boxing Day; he commented about the Germans, "The beggars simply disregard all our warnings to get down from off their parapet, so things are at a deadlock. We can't shoot them in cold blood.... I cannot see how we can get them to return to business."

On Christmas Eve and Christmas Day (24 and 25 December) 1914, Alfred Anderson's unit of the 1st/5th Battalion of the Black Watch was billeted in a farmhouse away from the front line. In a later interview (2003), Anderson, the last known surviving Scottish veteran of the war, vividly recalled Christmas Day and said:

I remember the silence, the eerie sound of silence. Only the guards were on duty. We all went outside the farm buildings and just stood listening. And, of course, thinking of people back home. All I'd heard for two months in the trenches was the hissing, cracking and whining of bullets in flight, machinegun fire and distant German voices. But there was a dead silence that morning, right across the land as far as you could see. We shouted 'Merry Christmas', even though nobody felt merry. The silence ended early in the afternoon and the killing started again. It was a short peace in a terrible war.

A German Lieutenant, Johannes Niemann, wrote "grabbed my binoculars and looking cautiously over the parapet saw the incredible sight of our soldiers exchanging cigarettes, schnapps and chocolate with the enemy".

General Sir Horace Smith-Dorrien, commander of the II Corps, issued orders forbidding friendly communication with the opposing German troops. Adolf Hitler, a corporal in the 16th Bavarian Reserve Infantry, was also an opponent of the truce.

In the Comines sector of the front there was an early fraternisation between German and French soldiers in December 1914, during a short truce, and there are at least two other testimonials from French soldiers of similar behaviour in sectors where German and French companies opposed each other. Gervais Morillon wrote to his parents, "The Boches waved a white flag and shouted 'Kamarades, Kamarades, rendez-vous'. When we didn't move they came towards us unarmed, led by an officer. Although we are not clean they are disgustingly filthy. I am telling you this but don't speak of it to anyone. We must not mention it even to other soldiers". Gustave Berthier wrote "On Christmas Day the Boches made a sign showing they wished to speak to us. They said they didn't want to shoot. ... They were tired of making war, they were married like me, they didn't have any differences with the French but with the English".

On the Yser Front, where German and Belgian troops faced each other in December 1914, a truce was arranged at the request of Belgian soldiers who wished to send letters back to their families over the German-occupied parts of Belgium.

=== Football matches ===
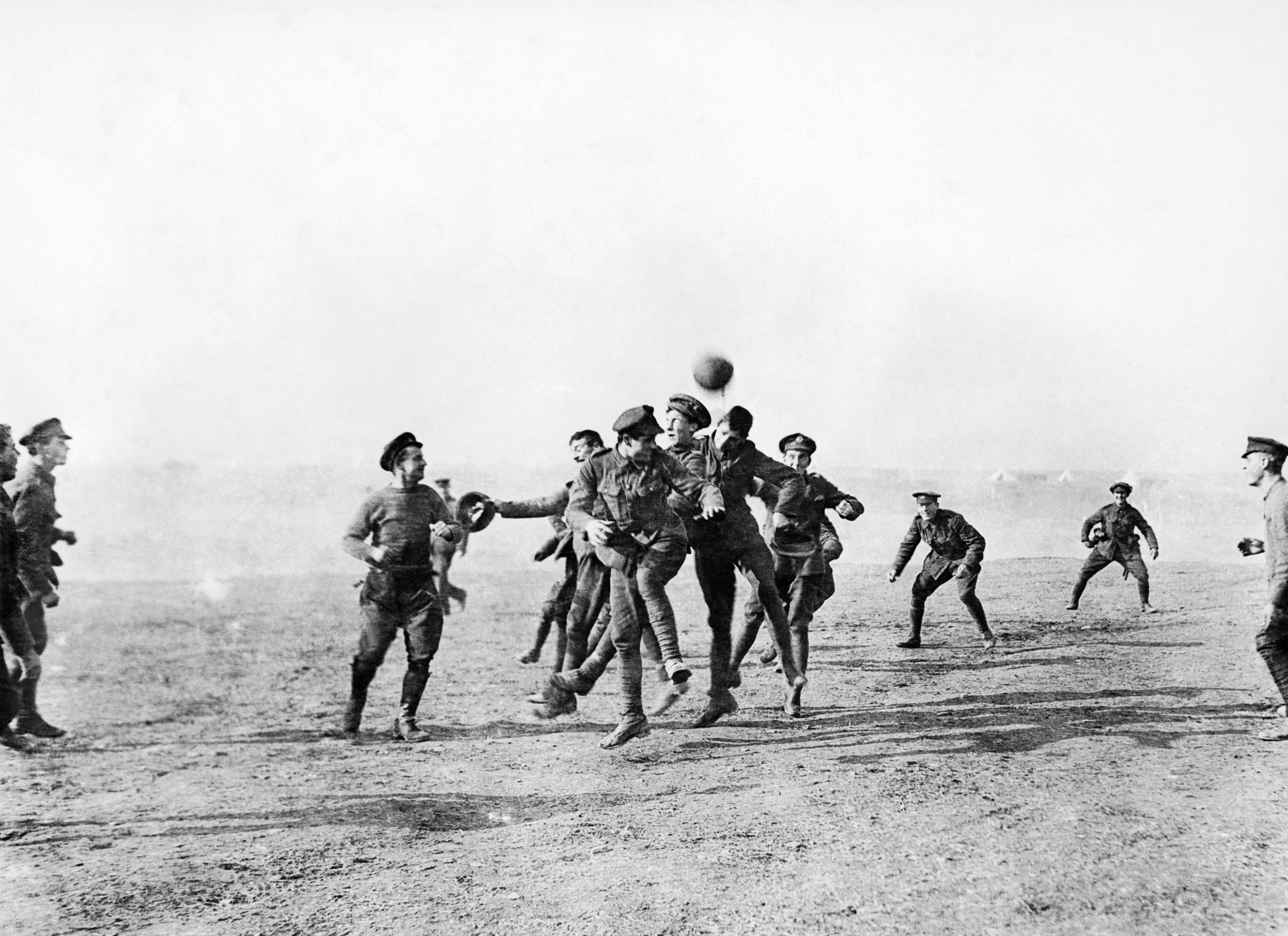
This photo is commonly mistaken as taking place during the 1914 Christmas truce. It is actually from 25 December 1915 near Thessaloniki, Greece. It shows British officers playing other ranks of the British 26th Divisional Ammunition Train.

Many accounts of the truce involve one or more football matches played in no man's land. This was mentioned in some of the earliest reports, with a letter written by a doctor attached to the Rifle Brigade, published in The Times on 1 January 1915, reporting "a football match... played between them and us in front of the trench". Similar stories have been told over the years, often naming units or the score. Some accounts of the game bring in elements of fiction by Robert Graves, a British poet and writer (and an officer on the front at the time) who reconstructed the encounter in a story published in 1962; in Graves's version, the score was 3–2 to the Germans.

The truth of the accounts has been disputed by some historians. In 1984, Malcolm Brown and Shirley Seaton concluded that there were probably attempts to play organised matches that failed owing to the state of the ground, but that the contemporary reports were either hearsay or refer to kick-abouts with made-up footballs such as a bully-beef tin. Chris Baker, former chairman of the Western Front Association and author of The Truce: The Day the War Stopped, was also sceptical but says that although there is little evidence, the most likely place that an organised match could have taken place was near the village of Messines: "There are two references to a game being played on the British side, but nothing from the Germans. If somebody one day found a letter from a German soldier who was in that area, then we would have something credible". Lieutenant Kurt Zehmisch of the 134th Saxon Infantry Regiment said that the English "brought a soccer ball from their trenches, and pretty soon a lively game ensued. How marvellously wonderful, yet how strange it was". In 2011 Mike Dash concluded that "there is plenty of evidence that football was played that Christmas Day—mostly by men of the same nationality but in at least three or four places between troops from the opposing armies".

Many units were reported in contemporary accounts to have taken part in games: Dash listed the 133rd Royal Saxon Regiment pitched against "Scottish troops"; the Argyll and Sutherland Highlanders against unidentified Germans (with the Scots reported to have won 4–1); the Royal Field Artillery against "Prussians and Hanovers" near Ypres and the Lancashire Fusiliers near Le Touquet, with the detail of a bully beef ration tin as the ball. One recent writer has identified 29 reports of football though does not give substantive details. Colonel J. E. B. Seely recorded in his diary for Christmas Day that he had been "Invited to football match between Saxons and English on New Year's Day", but this does not appear to have taken place.

=== Eastern Front ===
On the Eastern Front, the first move originated from Austro-Hungarian commanders, at some uncertain level of the military hierarchy. The Russians responded positively and soldiers eventually met in no man's land. Austrian junior doctor Josef Tomann recorded the Russian goodwill outside the town of Przemyśl: "On Christmas Morning our scouts found three Christmas trees the Russians had left in no-man's land with notes that said something like: 'We wish you, the heroes of Przemyśl, a Merry Christmas and hope we can come to a peaceful agreement as soon as possible.' ... On Christmas Day, they neither attacked, nor fired."

== Public awareness ==
The truces were not reported for a week, eventually being publicised to the masses when an unofficial press embargo was broken by The New York Times, published in the neutral United States, on 31 December. The British papers quickly followed, printing numerous first-hand accounts from soldiers in the field, taken from letters home to their families and editorials on "one of the greatest surprises of a surprising war". By 8 January 1915, pictures had made their way to the press, and the Mirror and Sketch printed front-page photographs of British and German troops mingling and singing between the lines. The tone of the reporting was strongly positive, with the Times endorsing the "lack of malice" felt by both sides and the Mirror regretting that the "absurdity and the tragedy" would begin again. Author Denis Winter argues that then "the censor had intervened" to prevent information about the spontaneous ceasefire from reaching the public and that the real dimension of the truce "only really came out when Captain Chudleigh in the Telegraph wrote after the war."

Coverage in Germany was less extensive than that of the British press, while in France, press censorship ensured that the only word that spread of the truce came from soldiers at the front or first-hand accounts told by wounded men in hospitals. The press was eventually forced to respond to the growing rumours by reprinting a government notice that fraternising with the enemy constituted treason. In early January, an official statement on the truce was published, claiming it was restricted to the British sector of the front and amounted to little more than an exchange of songs, which quickly degenerated into shooting.

The press of neutral Italy published a few articles on the events of the truce, usually reporting the articles of the foreign press. On 30 December 1914 Corriere della Sera printed a report about fraternisation between the opposing trenches. The Florentine newspaper La Nazione published a first-hand account about a football match played in no man's land. In Italy, the lack of interest in the truce was probably due to the occurrence of other events, such as the Italian occupation of Vlorë, the debut of the Garibaldi Legion on the front of the Argonne and the earthquake in Avezzano.

== Later truces ==
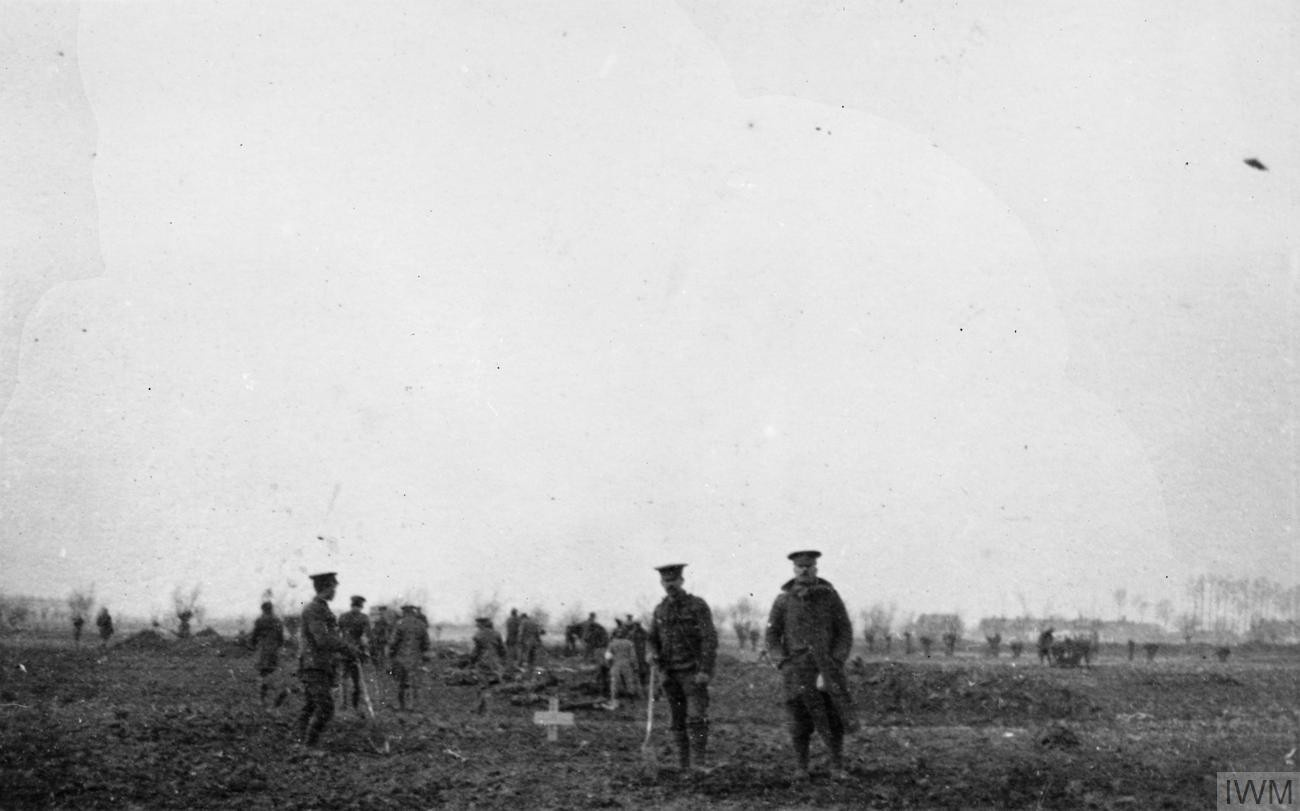
British and German troops burying the bodies of those killed in the attack of 18 December.

=== In WWI ===
After 1914, sporadic attempts were made at seasonal truces; on the Western Front, for example, a German unit attempted to leave their trenches under a flag of truce on Easter Sunday 1915 but were warned off by the British opposite them. At Easter 1915 on the Eastern Front there were truces between Orthodox troops of opposing sides; the Bulgarian writer Yordan Yovkov, serving as an officer near the Greek border at the Mesta river, witnessed one. It inspired his short story "Holy Night", translated into English in 2013 by Krastu Banaev. In November, a Saxon unit briefly fraternised with a Liverpool battalion.

On 24 May 1915, Australian and New Zealand Army Corps (ANZAC) and troops of the Ottoman Empire at Gallipoli agreed to a 9-hour truce to retrieve and bury their dead, during which opposing troops "exchang(ed) smiles and cigarettes".

In December 1915, there were orders by the Allied commanders to forestall any repeat of the previous Christmas truce. Units were encouraged to mount raids and harass the opposing line, whilst communicating with the enemy was discouraged by artillery barrages along the front line throughout the day; a small number of brief truces occurred despite the prohibition. On the German side, a general order from 29 December 1914 already forbade fraternisation with the enemy, warning German troops that "every approach to the enemy...will be punished as treason".

Richard Schirrmann from Altena (North Rhine Westphalia, Germany), the founder of the "Jugendherberge" and a soldier in a German regiment holding a position on the Bernhardstein, one of the Vosges Mountains, wrote an account of events in December 1915: "When the Christmas bells sounded in the villages of the Vosges behind the lines... something fantastically unmilitary occurred. German and French troops spontaneously made peace and ceased hostilities; they visited each other through disused trench tunnels, and exchanged wine, cognac and cigarettes for Pumpernickel (Westphalian black bread), biscuits and ham. This suited them so well that they remained good friends even after Christmas was over". He was separated from the French troops by a narrow No Man's Land and described the landscape "Strewn with shattered trees, the ground ploughed up by shellfire, a wilderness of earth, tree-roots and tattered uniforms". Military discipline was soon restored but Schirrmann pondered over the incident and whether "thoughtful young people of all countries could be provided with suitable meeting places where they could get to know each other". He founded the German Youth Hostel Association in 1919.

An account by Llewelyn Wyn Griffith, recorded that after a night of exchanging carols, dawn on Christmas Day saw a "rush of men from both sides... [and] a feverish exchange of souvenirs" before the men were quickly called back by their officers, with offers to hold a ceasefire for the day and to play a football match. It came to nothing, as the brigade commander threatened repercussions for lack of discipline and insisted on a resumption of firing in the afternoon. Another member of Griffith's battalion, Bertie Felstead, later recalled that one man had produced a football, resulting in "a free-for-all; there could have been 50 on each side", before they were ordered back. Another unnamed participant reported in a letter home: "The Germans seem to be very nice chaps, and said they were awfully sick of the war." In the evening, according to Robert Keating "The Germans were sending up star lights and singing – they stopped, so we cheered them & we began singing Land of Hope and Glory – Men of Harlech et cetera – we stopped and they cheered us. So we went on till the early hours of the morning".

In an adjacent sector, a short truce to bury the dead between the lines led to repercussions; a company commander, Sir Iain Colquhoun of the Scots Guards, was court-martialled for defying standing orders to the contrary. While he was found guilty and reprimanded, the punishment was annulled by General Douglas Haig, and Colquhoun remained in his position; the official leniency may perhaps have been because his wife's uncle was H. H. Asquith, the Prime Minister.

In December 1916 and 1917, German overtures to the British for truces were recorded without any success. In some French sectors, singing and an exchange of thrown gifts was occasionally recorded, though these may simply have reflected a seasonal extension of the live-and-let-live approach common in the trenches.

=== In WWII ===
In 1944, another truce during World War II happened, during the Battle of the Bulge. It is known as the Christmas Eve truce of 1944, actually an informal ceasefire between American and German soldiers. The incident was described in a later account by Fritz Vincken, who as a child reportedly witnessed the event in a remote cabin near the German–Belgian border.

== Legacy and historical significance ==
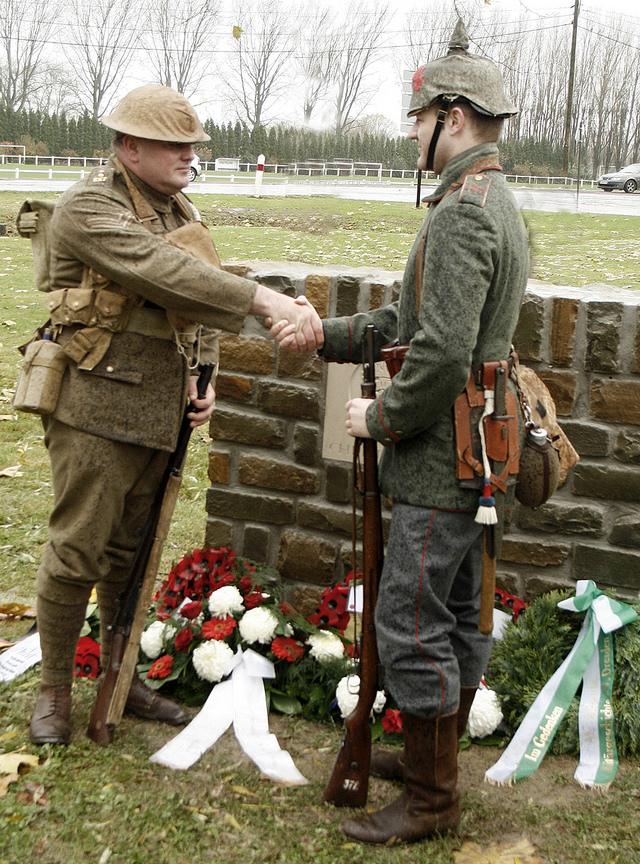
British and German descendants of Great War veterans.

Although the popular tendency has been to see the December 1914 Christmas Truces as unique and of romantic rather than political significance, they have also been interpreted as part of the widespread spirit of non-cooperation with the war. In his book on trench warfare, Tony Ashworth described the 'live and let live system'. Complicated local truces and agreements not to fire at each other were negotiated by men along the front throughout the war. These often began with agreement not to attack each other at tea, meal or washing times. In some places tacit agreements became so common that sections of the front would see few casualties for extended periods of time. This system, Ashworth argues, 'gave soldiers some control over the conditions of their existence'. The December 1914 Christmas Truces can therefore be seen as not unique but as the most dramatic example of the spirit of non-cooperation with the war that included refusals to fight, unofficial truces, mutinies, strikes and peace protests.

- In the 1933 play Petermann schließt Frieden oder Das Gleichnis vom deutschen Opfer (Petermann Makes Peace: or, The Parable of German Sacrifice), written by Nazi writer and World War I veteran Heinz Steguweit, a German soldier, accompanied by Christmas carols sung by his comrades, erects an illuminated Christmas tree between the trenches but is shot dead. Later, when his comrades find his body, they notice in horror that snipers have shot down every Christmas light from the tree.
- The video for the 1983 song "Pipes of Peace" by Paul McCartney depicts a fictional version of the Christmas Truce.
- John McCutcheon's 1984 song "Christmas in the Trenches" tells the story of the 1914 truce through the eyes of a fictional soldier. Performing the song he met German veterans of the truce.
- "Goodbyeee", the final episode of the BBC television series Blackadder Goes Forth notes the Christmas Truce, with the main character, Edmund Blackadder recalling having played in a football match. He is still annoyed at having had a goal disallowed for offside.
- The song "All Together Now" by Liverpool band The Farm, took its inspiration from the Christmas Truce. The song was rerecorded by The Peace Collective for release in December 2014 to mark the centenary of the event.
- The 1996 song "It Could Happen Again" by country artist Collin Raye, which tells the story of the Christmas truce, is included on his Christmas album, Christmas: The Gift, with a spoken intro by Johnny Cash giving the history behind the event.
- The 1997 song, "Belleau Wood" by Garth Brooks depicts soldiers leaving their trenches to sing carols together and braving the risk of being shot by their enemies to do so.
- The truce is dramatised in the 2005 French film Joyeux Noël (Merry Christmas), depicted through the eyes of French, Scottish and German soldiers. The film, written and directed by Christian Carion, was screened out of competition at the 2005 Cannes Film Festival, but was nominated for the Academy Award for Best Foreign Language Film.
- The opera Silent Night by composer Kevin Puts and librettist Mark Campbell had its world premiere at the Ordway Theater, Saint Paul, Minnesota, on 12 November 2011. The libretto is based on the screenplay for the 2005 film Joyeux Noël. In 2012 Kevin Puts was named the Pulitzer Prize Winner in Music for this opera.
- In the Robot Chicken episode "Born Again Virgin Christmas Special", there's a skit titled "Christmas 1914", which involves a British soldier wishing for Santa to bust through the German line for the British, only for the Christmas Truce to commence, but Santa arrives and massacres all the Germans, with the British powerless to stop him.
- Ahead of the centenary of the truce, English composer Chris Eaton and singer Abby Scott produced the song, "1914 – The Carol of Christmas", to benefit British armed forces charities. At 5 December 2014, it had reached top of the iTunes Christmas chart.
- Sainsbury's produced a short film for the 2014 Christmas season as an advertisement re-enacting the events of the Christmas Truce, primarily following a young English soldier in the trenches.
- In the Doctor Who 2017 Christmas Special "Twice Upon a Time", the First and Twelfth Doctors become accidentally involved in the fate of a British captain seemingly destined to die in No Man's Land in a standoff with a German soldier. The Twelfth Doctor sent him a few hours forward in time so that the start of the Christmas Truce would prevent him from being killed.
- On 29 October 2021, the Swedish heavy-metal band Sabaton released their single "Christmas Truce" about the events of the Christmas Truce in 1914, followed 40 days later by an animated story video set to the song in cooperation with the animated history YouTube channel Yarnhub.
- On December 16, 2022, the charity Cancer Awareness Trust released a charity single commemorating the event entitled "This Christmas Time", where heavy metal singer Ozzy Osbourne read the opening narration.

=== Monuments ===
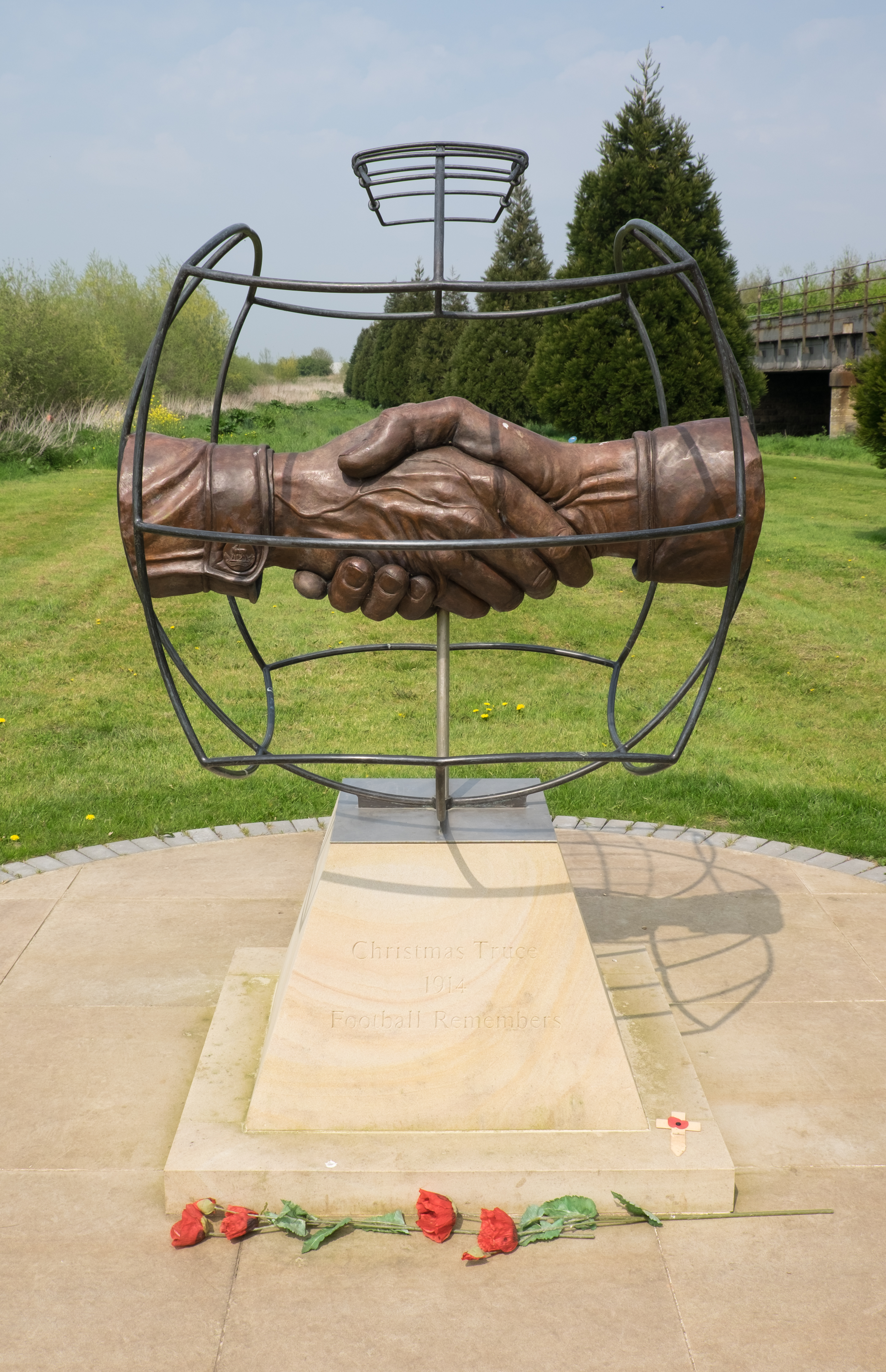
Football Remembers memorial at the National Memorial Arboretum in Staffordshire.

A Christmas Truce memorial was unveiled in Frelinghien, France, on 11 November 2008. At the spot where their regimental ancestors came out from their trenches to play football on Christmas Day 1914, men from the 1st Battalion, the Royal Welch Fusiliers played a football match with the German Battalion 371. The Germans won 2–1. On 12 December 2014, a memorial was unveiled at the National Memorial Arboretum in Staffordshire, England by Prince William, Duke of Cambridge and the England national football team manager Roy Hodgson. The Football Remembers memorial was designed by a ten-year-old schoolboy, Spencer Turner, after a UK-wide competition.

A memorial was unveiled in december 1914 in Ploegstreert, Belgium. It remembers football match with 'Plug Street' Uefa memorial.

=== Annual re-enactments ===
The Midway Village in Rockford, Illinois, United States, has hosted re-enactments of the Christmas Truce.

Another re-enactment is held each year in Ploegsteert on the last weekend before Christmas. This is the place where a football match was played in 1914 during the Truce. This re-enactment gradually gained importance to include a bivouac, permanent trenches, a football match, public support and a peace candle ceremony

=== Last survivor ===
The last known living participant of the Christmas Truce was Alfred Anderson. He served as part of the 1/5th Angus and Dundee Battalion of the Black Watch (Royal Highland Regiment). He died on 21 November 2005, aged 109, nearly 91 years after the truce.
