= Bright Williams =

New Zealand soldier and farmer (1897–2003)

Bright Ernest Williams
- Born: 27 February 1897; Rissington, New Zealand
- Died: 13 February 2003 (aged 105); Hastings, New Zealand
- Military career
- Allegiance: New Zealand
- Branch: New Zealand Expeditionary Force
- Service years: 1916–1918
- Rank: Rifleman
- Units: 3rd Battalion, New Zealand Rifle Brigade
- Conflicts: First World War; Battle of Messines; Battle of Passchendaele
- Awards: Légion d’honneur (France)

Bright Ernest Williams (27 February 1897 – 13 February 2003) was, at the time of his death, the last New Zealand veteran of the First World War, out of the 100,444 New Zealanders to fight in that war.

== Early life and First World War ==
Williams was born the son of a blacksmith in Rissington, north of Napier, New Zealand. While a shepherd working on a farm in Hawke’s Bay, he inflated his age by three years in order to enlist in the New Zealand Army in March 1916. By 1917, he was on the front lines in Belgium working as a runner with the 3rd Battalion New Zealand Rifle Brigade at Messines, before being severely wounded in the Battle of Passchendaele on 12 October 1917. As he and an officer tried to move forward in front of a German machine gun post at Wolf Farm, both were peppered by bullets. The officer was killed, while Williams remained out overnight in a muddy shell hole with three bullet wounds, one of which had shattered his thigh. During the Battle 845 New Zealand soldiers of the New Zealand Division were killed in action, with over 2,700 being wounded. In total for that battle, the allied forces suffered 508,800 casualties, while Germany suffered 348,300 casualties. During a 2001 interview, Williams spoke of suffering through mud and freezing rain, and sheltering in trenches among the corpses of dead German soldiers. No longer fit for service, Williams returned to farming in Hawke’s Bay where he continued to be troubled by his wounds.

== Later life ==
To mark the 80th anniversary of the end of the War in 1998, French President Jacques Chirac granted approval for the award of the Légion d’honneur to an estimated 1200 surviving foreign soldiers who had fought alongside the French on the Western Front. This commemoration started with a visit to New Zealand by the French Minister for War Veterans, Jean Pierre Masseret in April 1998, to enlist help from the Government in locating surviving Great War veterans in New Zealand. Only nine survivors were located and eight were still alive when presentations were made around the country by French Ambassador Jaques Le Blanc in October and November 1998. Most of the recipients were over 100 years old and gratefully accepted the awards in recognition of their lost mates and the high price paid by the New Zealand Army in the First World War. Williams received his Croix de Chevalier of the Légion d'honneur from the French Ambassador at the Napier RSA in 1998, and wore "it on parade to honour men who did not come back from France, who were buried there in known and unknown graves".

Williams died on 13 February 2003 at the age of 105. At the time of his death, Williams had two daughters, eleven grandchildren, twenty great-grandchildren, and two great-great-grandchildren.

== Documentaries ==
- Bright Williams - Last Man Standing Execam Video

== See also ==
- List of last surviving World War I veterans by country
