= 1st Minnesota Heavy Artillery Regiment =

- Active: November, 1864 to September 27, 1865
- Country: United States
- Allegiance: Union
- Branch: Artillery
- Engagements: None

Commanders
- Colonel: Luther Loren Baxter
- Notable commanders: Colonel William J. Colvill

The 1st Minnesota Heavy Artillery Regiment was a Minnesota USV artillery regiment during the American Civil War.

== Service ==
The 1st Minnesota Heavy Artillery Regiment mustered in at St. Paul, and Rochester, Minnesota, between November 1864 and February 1865. Many of the officers were recruited from discharged veterans: sergeants from the 1st Minnesota while corporals came from the 3rd, 4th, and 5th Minnesota Vol. Regiments. The 1st Minnesota Heavy was composed of twelve companies / batteries, of 140 men plus officers in each. It was the largest unit Minnesota sent to war numbering 1700 men.

The regiment was assigned to garrison duty at Chattanooga, Tennessee. There it was in charge of the heavy guns at forts defending the city in anticipation Southern General John Hood might try and retake the Chattanooga. The regiment saw no combat, remained there until the close of the war. The 1st Minnesota "Heavies" were mustered out of service on September 27, 1865.

== Legacy ==
Albert Woolson, who was a 14-year-old company drummer in the regiment, became the last surviving veteran of the American Civil War from either side after dying in 1956.

== Commanding officers ==
- Lt. Colonel Luther Loren Baxter, February 25, 1865, to April 26, 1865.
- Colonel William Colvill, April 26, 1865, to May 6, 1865.
- Colonel Luther Loren Baxter, May 7, 1865, to September 27, 1865.

== Casualties and total strength ==
The regiment lost 87 enlisted men to disease. Many more suffered from scurvy and would never regain complete health.

== See also ==
- List of Minnesota Civil War Units
