= Alfred Anderson (veteran) =

Chairman of the local branch of the Royal British Legion

Anderson in February 2005.

Alfred Anderson (25 June 1896 – 21 November 2005) was a Scottish joiner and veteran of the First World War. He was the last known holder of the 1914 Star (the Old Contemptibles), the last known combatant to participate in the 1914 World War I Christmas truce, Scotland's last known World War I veteran, and Scotland's oldest man for more than a year.

== Early life ==
Alfred Anderson was born on 25 June 1896 at 20 Kirloch Street, Dundee. He was the son of Andrew Anderson, a joiner, and Christina Thomas Emmerson. His parents married on 5 September 1888 in Chicago, United States, where they had two sons before returning to Scotland. The Andersons went on to have four more children, including Alfred. Andrew Anderson died on 31 July 1943, aged eighty-one, of bronchial asthma – from which he had suffered for over twenty-five years – and bronchopneumonia. Christina Anderson died of cardiovascular degeneration on 9 January 1953, aged eighty-four. Alfred registered both of his parents' deaths.

== First World War (1914–1918) ==
In October 1914, Anderson left his home and with the rest of the 1/5th Angus and Dundee Battalion of the Black Watch (Royal Highland Regiment), travelled by train from Dundee to Southampton and then crossed the English Channel by ferry to Le Havre. The regiment was mainly recruited in the County of Angus, so Anderson was surrounded by a group of friends with whom he had joined the Territorial Force in 1912 at the age of sixteen; he thought that he was going on a grand adventure and as Anderson recalled in a television interview in 2005, it offered the chance of a holiday. The young lads who had joined up had volunteered to go and fight on the Western Front.

On Christmas Eve and Christmas Day (24 and 25 December) 1914, Anderson's unit was billeted in a farmhouse away from the front line. He vividly recalled the day and once said:

I remember the silence, the eerie sound of silence. Only the guards were on duty. We all went outside the farm buildings and just stood listening. And, of course, thinking of people back home. All I'd heard for two months in the trenches was the hissing, cracking and whining of bullets in flight, machinegun fire and distant German voices.

But there was a dead silence that morning, right across the land as far as you could see. We shouted 'Merry Christmas', even though nobody felt merry. The silence ended early in the afternoon and the killing started again. It was a short peace in a terrible war.

Bertie Felstead, who died in August 2001 at the age of 106, was originally believed to have been the last survivor of the Christmas Truce. However, it later emerged that Alfred Anderson had participated in the Christmas Truce, and he outlived Felstead by four years.

The following year the 1/5th Battalion fought at the Battle of Neuve Chapelle and Loos. He became batman to his platoon commander Lieutenant Ian Bruce Gardyne MC, and also briefly to Captain Fergus Bowes-Lyon, brother to Queen Elizabeth The Queen Mother. Bowes-Lyon (1889–1915) was killed during the Battle of the Hohenzollern Redoubt in the Battle of Loos.

Whilst Alfred Anderson was serving as a batman, he would often go out at night with Bruce-Gardyne into No-Man's Land to listen for enemy activity such as tunneling or troop movements. On one of these night-time watches, Anderson was wounded in the back of the neck by shrapnel from shellfire in 1916. The wound, termed a 'Blighty' wound, meant that he was sent home to Britain to recuperate. After recovering at a hospital in Norfolk he became an infantry instructor at a camp near Ripon, rising to the rank of Staff Sergeant by the end of the war in 1918. It was during his time as an instructor that he met and married his wife, Susanna Iddison (1896–1979). Following the war, he took her back to Scotland and recommenced life as a joiner in his father's business.

== Second World War (1939–1945) ==
When the Second World War erupted in 1939, Alfred by now was aged forty-three and therefore too old to be drafted into the military. He was placed in command of a detachment of the Home Guard which ensured that he 'did his bit' for 'King and country' a second time. Following the British and Allied victory in 1945, Anderson was elected Chairman of the local branch of the British Legion.

== Postwar ==
His wife died in 1979 and he moved to Alyth to be near his youngest daughter.

He was awarded the Légion d'honneur in 1998 along with all First World War combat veterans who fought on French soil. In 2003, when his service as batman to Fergus Bowes-Lyon (who was killed in 1915) came out, then-Prince Charles went to visit him. Charles is the great-nephew of Fergus Bowes-Lyon.

Six weeks before his own death, he moved to Mundamalla Nursing Home, where he died in November 2005 at the age of 109. At the time of his death, he was Scotland's oldest man. He died just a few weeks after featuring in the BBC One documentary The Last Tommy, which interviewed some of the last surviving First World War British Army veterans (nicknamed Tommy or Tommy Atkins).

The widower, who had five children, said he had lost count of his grandchildren and great-grandchildren. He was actually survived by four children, ten grandchildren, 18 great-grandchildren, and two great-great-grandchildren. A biography (Alfred Anderson: A Life in Three Centuries) was published in 2002, and a bust of him stands on display at the public library in Alyth.

About Christmas, Anderson said:

I'll give Christmas Day 1914 a brief thought, as I do every year. And I'll think about all my friends who never made it home. But it's too sad to think too much about it. Far too sad.
