= Albert Marshall (veteran) =

British Army soldier

Albert Elliot "Smiler" Marshall (15 March 1897 – 16 May 2005) was a British veteran of the First World War and the last surviving British cavalryman to have seen battle on the Western Front.

Albert Elliott Marshall was born on 15 March 1897 in Elmstead Market, a village in the Tendring district of Essex, close to Great Bromley, Great Bentley, Wivenhoe and Colchester. He was the eldest of three children born to James William Marshall and Ellen Marshall, née Skeet. His mother died in 1901, aged 24, leaving James to raise the children on his own.

Marshall joined the Essex Yeomanry in 1915, at the age of seventeen, after lying about his age; he took part in the Battle of Loos in the same year. He was given the nickname "Smiler" during his basic training at Stanway, Essex, where he threw a snowball at someone during drill, stood there looking innocent, but the sergeant suspected him and addressed him "You, smiler!" and that name stuck.

Marshall served in the 1/1st Essex Yeomanry and later the 8th Battalion, Machine Gun Corps between 1915 and 1919 and saw action at the Battle of the Somme, Battle of Arras, the Third Battle of Ypres, the Germany Offensive of 1918 as well as the Advance to Victory and the Army of Occupation campaigns at the end of the war. Marshall recalled the horrors of the battlefield and his memories of seeing many of his comrades blown to bits by enemy shells or mown down in No Man's Land by a hail of bullets.

The Battle of the Somme, beginning on 1 July 1916, had no greater resonance for Smiler than all the other battles he had fought throughout the war. He had been sent to France in late 1915 and despite a number of periods of home leave had remained in or near the front line for the remainder of the war. He was present on the Somme for the first day of the offensive in which over 20,000 troops were killed in the first several hours, with 40,000 more injured, making the battle one of the heaviest death and wounded tolls of the war. Marshall had been kept well behind the lines during the opening day of the Somme campaign waiting for a breakthrough, however it did not come.

As a result of his unit being kept back during the Somme, Marshall was not credited with being the last veteran of the opening day; nonetheless, he remembered the trauma and horror of that campaign and the images on the battlefield remained with him. He later recalled picking up and sending home the letters found next to the body of a man killed near Mametz Wood.

In March 1917, Marshall suffered a blighty wound in the hand and was sent home. On his return he joined the Machine Gun Corps and fought at the Battle of Cambrai where he was captured as a Prisoner of War by the Germans. Smiler was released by his captors as they were short of rations and returned to the front.

When the war ended in 1918, Marshall volunteered for a tour of duty in Ireland and was stationed near Dublin. He was demobbed in 1921 and returned home to Tendring where he married Florence C. Day. The couple had five children.

In his later years, Marshall continued to live in a small house, which was attached to a larger house in which he had worked for the owner since the Second World War. He kept by his bedside a wooden cross taken from the rubble of Albert Basilica at the time of the Battle of Somme.

In the final decade of his life, Marshall was awarded the Légion d'honneur and appeared on numerous television shows as well as attending a veterans' party at Buckingham Palace. He also took part in three pilgrimages to the battlefields of the First World War, including one to mark the 80th anniversary of the Third Battle of Ypres.

Marshall died at the age of 108 on 16 May 2005 in Ashtead, Surrey. At the time of his death he was survived by one son; twelve grandchildren; twenty-four great-grandchildren and four great-great-grandchildren.

Marshall's legacy as one of the last surviving veterans of the First World War was that he was able to claim a number of records: the last man to wear the 1914–15 Star; the last man to serve on the Somme and perhaps, the most significant for a man who had served in the Essex Yeomanry, the last man to have served in the cavalry.
