= Enrique Sinclair =

Argentinian military officer (1805–1904)

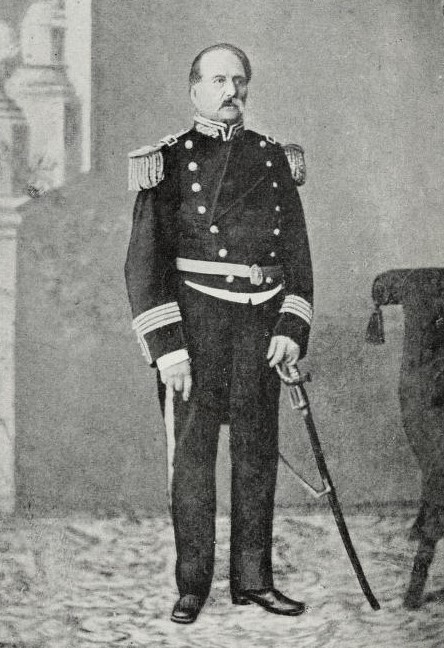
- Born: Henry Sinclair; February 9, 1805; New York City, United States
- Died: September 17, 1904 (aged 99); San Isidro, Buenos Aires, Argentina
- Burial place: La Recoleta Cemetery
- Spouse: Petrona Acosta Rivero
- Military career
- Allegiance: Argentina
- Branch: Argentine Navy
- Service years: 1820-1892
- Rank: Captain (naval)
- Conflicts: Combate de Los Pozos; Combate de Quilmes; Batalla de Juncal; Batalla de Monte Santiago; Batalla de Yeruá; Guerra Grande

Enrique Sinclair (1805–1904) was an Argentine military officer of American origin. He had an outstanding performance serving in the Navy of Admiral Brown, participating heroically in the Battle of Juncal.

== Biography ==
Sinclair was born in New York (North America), son of James Sinclair and Elise Morrell, belonging to a family of pioneers. He arrived at the port of Buenos Aires at an early age, enlisting in the Navy of William Brown, taking part in the Brazilian War. Finished the war of Brazil was promoted to captain in 1830, serving as Comandante of the sumaca República. In 1831 he served temporarily as Captain of the pontoon schooner Goleta Maldonado. In 1832 Sinclair was promoted to Sergeant Mayor.

Sinclair was the last Captain who had the Goleta Sarandí, a ship who served in favor of the Legión Libertadora (Unitarios) against the Argentine Confederation. This ship stood out from the rest for its high performance of navigation. The Schooner Sarandí also had served during the war of Brazil.

For having helped to leave the country to Valentín Alsina, he was discharged on October 17, 1837, by order of Juan Manuel de Rosas. Sinclair was emigrated to the city of Montevideo that same year. After participating in the battle of Yeruá, he was promoted to Lieutenant colonel in 1839.

In 1843, Enrique Sinclair took part in the defense of Montevideo against the invasion of Manuel Oribe to the city. He returned to Argentina after the Battle of Caseros, being reincorporated into the Argentine navy where he held various destinations until his retirement in 1892.

== Family ==
In 1833, Enrique Sinclair Morrell was married to Petrona Alcántara Buenaventura Acosta y Rivero, daughter of José Acosta and Dominga Rivero. He and his wife were the parents of Enrique Fortunato Sinclair Acosta, born on January 9, 1836, Víctor Horacio Sinclair Acosta (1850), and María Aparicia Sinclair Acosta (1854), wife of Walter Jorge Green (Naval officer).

At present, a street in the city of Buenos Aires bears its name in his honor and memory.
