= William Lundy =

Alleged American Civil War veteran

William Allen "Uncle Bill" Lundy
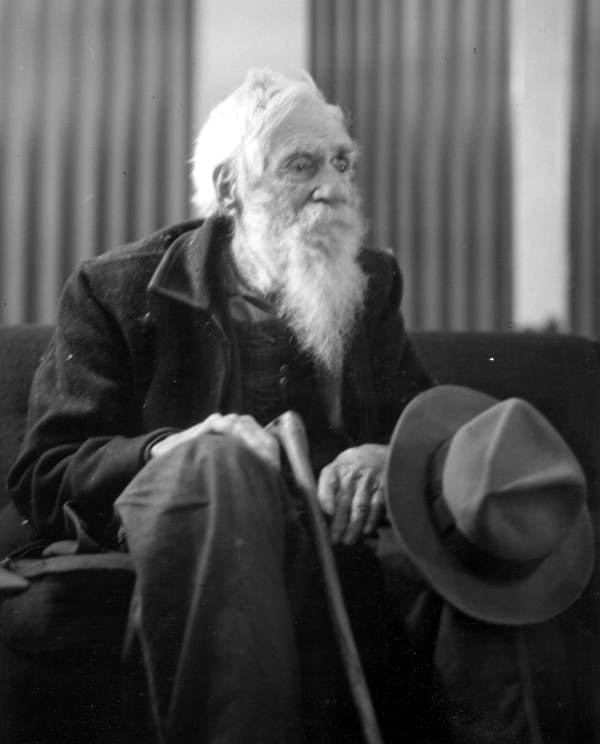
- William Allen Lundy in 1955
- Born: January 18, 1848 or January 18, 1859; Troy, Alabama, U.S.
- Died: September 1, 1957 (98 or 109); Crestview, Florida, U.S.
- Burial place: Almarant Cemetery
- Military career
- Allegiance: Confederate States of America (claimed)
- Branch: Confederate States Army
- Service years: 1864-1865 (claimed)
- Rank: Private
- Nickname: Uncle Bill
- Unit: 4th Alabama Cavalry

William Allen Lundy (January 18, 1848? – September 1, 1957) claimed to be one of the last living Confederate veterans of the American Civil War, having claimed to have served with the 4th Alabama Infantry from 1864 to 1865. His age is disputed and some records suggest he was born in 1859, not 1848.

== Biography ==
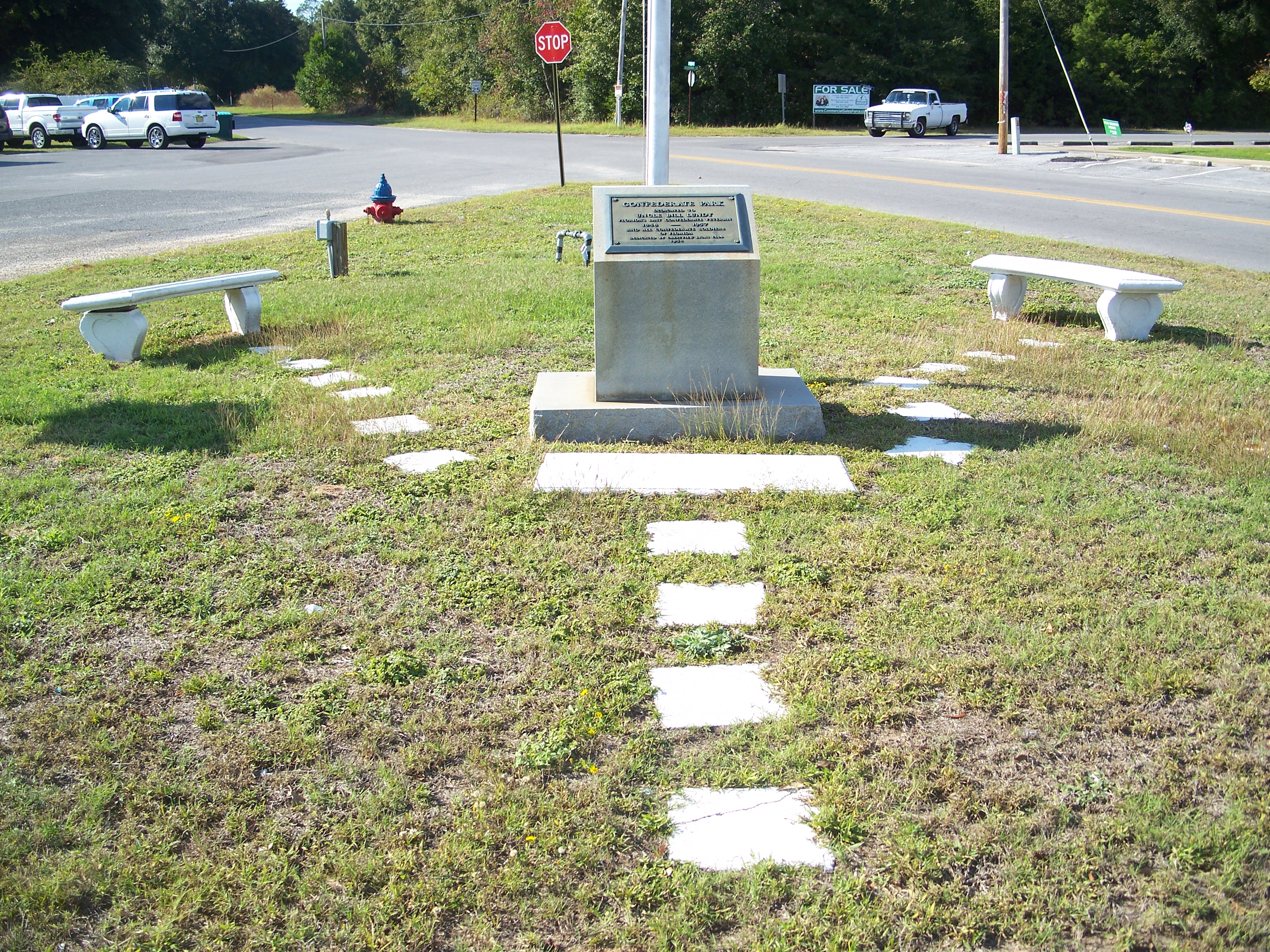
Lundy memorial at Confederate Park, in Crestview (now moved 4.6 miles / 7.4 km north to the community of Auburn).

William Lundy was allegedly born near Troy, in Pike County, Alabama, on January 18, 1848 (also reported at Coffee Springs, Coffee County). He is said to have enlisted in the last days of March 1864, at age 16; Company D (Brown's), 4th Alabama Cavalry Regiment (Home Guard) at Elba; and to have been honorably discharged at Elba in May 1865, on account of the end of the war. He moved his family to Laurel Hill in 1890, where he and his wife, Mary Jane Lassiter, raised ten children.

He was granted a Confederate soldier's pension in Florida, no. 8948, of $600 per annum to be paid effective from June 12, 1941. At some point the pension increased to $75 per month ($900 per annum), and finally, in 1953, to $150 per month ($1800 per annum). On January 18, 1955, the Boston Traveler published an article, "Reb on T.V.", of which William Allen Lundy was the subject; making mention of the 107-year-old Confederate veteran being on television in Pensacola.

By a Joint Resolution of Congress of July 18, 1956, a gold medal was authorized to be struck and presented to the only four surviving Civil War veterans: one Union veteran and three Confederate veterans. The Union soldier, Albert Woolson, died before the medals could be presented.

== Age dispute ==
He claimed to be the last surviving Confederate soldier residing in Florida, and one of three (all Confederate) Civil War veterans still alive at the time in the United States. At the alleged age of 109, Lundy died in Crestview, Okaloosa County, on September 1, 1957. He is interred at Almarante Cemetery, Laurel Hill.

However, 1860 Census records suggest that Lundy was born in 1859, which would mean that he was only six years old at the end of the Civil War—implying that he could never have fought in it—and 98 when he died. In addition, research in 2016 suggested that no evidence in favor of either Lundy or his father having served could be found.

== See also ==
- Last surviving United States war veterans
