= Walter Williams (centenarian) =

American centenarian

Walter Washington Williams
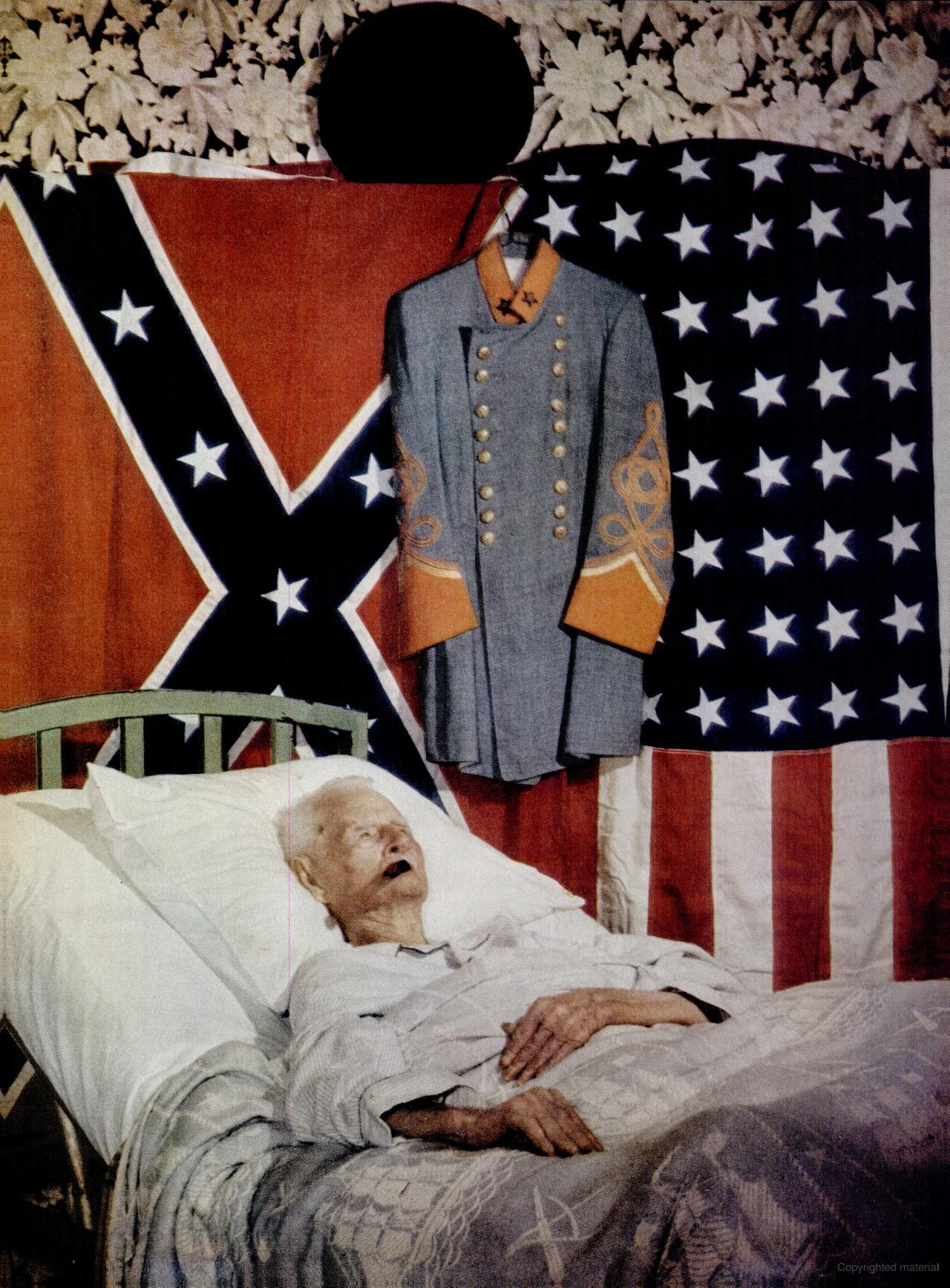
- Williams in 1959 presumably on his death-bed
- Born: November 14, 1842 or 1854; Itawamba County, Mississippi, U.S.
- Died: December 19, 1959 (117 or 105); Houston, Texas, U.S.
- Military career
- Known for: Claim to last surviving Confederate veteran

Walter Washington Williams (November 14, 1842 or 1854 – December 19, 1959) was an American man who claimed to have been a forager for Hood's Brigade, which if true made him the last surviving veteran of the American Civil War. However, serious doubts have been raised about the veracity of these claims.

== Last surviving veteran claims ==
Born in Itawamba County, Mississippi, Williams claimed to have served under General John Bell Hood, as a foragemaster in Hood's Brigade and Quantrill's guerrillas. Since John Salling and all the other "last claimants" were dead, Williams was celebrated as the "last Confederate veteran." When he died in 1959 in Houston, Texas, at the reported age of 117, U.S. Grant III, chairman of the Civil War Centennial, said the death was an occasion for national mourning.

However, in September 1959, Scripps-Howard journalist Lowell K. Bridwell revealed that he could not find "one single scrap" of substantiating evidence to back up Williams's age or claims of military service, or anyone else's for that matter. Moreover, the 1860 census listed Williams as age 5 in June 1860, suggesting that he was born in November 1854.

When he died on December 19, 1959, according to his New York Times obituary, "a newspaper story said a check had failed to find evidence to support the claim. Back in the times when Williams was born, there was very limited documentation to support birth dates, death dates, etc." Based on Bridwell, he would have been eight years old at the time he said he had joined the Confederate Army, eleven months before the war ended in 1865. It also was reported that the National Archives listed no Walter G. Williams as having served in the Confederate Army from either his home state of Mississippi or from Texas, where his family later settled. Archives at Jackson, Mississippi, however, were said to list a Walter Washington Williams as a private. Williams said that he had used several different middle initials.

Other officials contended that the Archives of the Federal Government are incomplete on the Confederacy and that ages in census records sometimes are inaccurate. A 1991 article by William Marvel gave further details suggesting Williams was born between October 1854 and April 1855.

Irrespective of the controversy, his grave is marked at the Mount Pleasant Church Cemetery near New Baden, Robertson County, Texas. An interpretive sign was provided by the Texas Civil War Centennial Commission in 1963.

The "Soldiers and Sailors of the Confederacy" monument by Donald De Lue at the Gettysburg battlefield site bears an inscription about Williams on the reverse of the base. The inscription reads, "Walter Washington Williams -- who was recognized by the government of the United States as the last surviving Confederate veteran died 1959 at the age of 117 years."

== See also ==
- Last surviving United States war veterans
