= James Hard =

Last surviving Union Army combat veteran of the United States Civil War

- Born: James Albert Hard; July 15, 1843; Windsor, New York, U.S.
- Died: March 12, 1953 (aged 109 years, 240 days); Rochester, New York, U.S.
- Military career
- Allegiance: United States
- Branch: Union Army
- Service years: 1861–1863
- Unit: (New York (state)) 32nd New York Volunteer Infantry Regiment
- Conflicts: American Civil War: First Battle of Bull Run; Battle of Antietam; Battle of Fredericksburg; Battle of Chancellorsville

James Albert Hard (July 15, 1843 – March 12, 1953) was the last verified living Union combat veteran of the American Civil War and the third-to-last verified veteran overall; only drummer boys Frank H. Mayer and Albert Woolson post-deceased him. Though he claimed to have been born in 1841, research in 2006 found that the 1850 Census indicated a birthdate of 1843.

Hard was born in Windsor, New York on July 15, 1843. He enlisted in his town on April 16, 1861, very shortly after the start of the American Civil War. He then enlisted in New York City on May 14, joining the 32nd New York Volunteer Infantry Regiment on May 31 upon its creation. Hard was initially assigned to Company K on May 31, before being transferred to Company E the same day; he served with the regiment as "Albert". He participated in the battles of First Bull Run, Antietam, Fredericksburg, and Chancellorsville. He did not take part in the Peninsula campaign as he was recovering from a fever at the Fort Monroe hospital at the time. The regiment's term of service expired on June 9, 1863 before the Gettysburg campaign. He claimed to have met President Abraham Lincoln at a White House reception.

Hard subsequently worked in construction and law. He died in Rochester, New York, at the reported age of 111. Census research indicates, however, that he was two years younger and probably inflated his age in order to enter the military. He is recorded as having joined the Union Army on May 14, 1861, aged 19 (but in reality was 17). The 1850, 1910, and 1920 censuses, however, suggest that he was born in 1843 and 1842 respectively.

== See also ==
- Last surviving United States war veterans
