= Mustafa Şekip Birgöl =

Turkish Army officer (1903–2008)

- Born: 1903; Üsküdar, Istanbul, Ottoman Empire
- Died: 11 November 2008 (aged 105); Haydarpaşa, Istanbul, Turkey
- Burial place: Karacaahmet Cemetery, Istanbul
- Military career
- Allegiance: Turkey
- Branch: Turkish Army
- Service years: 1921–1952
- Rank: Colonel
- Conflicts: Turkish War of Independence
- Awards: Medal of Independence with red ribbon

Mustafa Şekip Birgöl (1903 – 11 November 2008) was a Turkish colonel and the last-surviving combat veteran of the Turkish War of Independence (1919–1923).

== Biography ==
He was born in 1903 in Üsküdar, a suburb of Istanbul, into a family of naval officers. Mustafa Şekip Birgöl graduated from Işıklar Military Secondary School in Bursa before attending Kuleli High School in Edirne. After finishing the Military Academy in Istanbul, he joined the Kuvayi Milliye under the leadership of Mustafa Kemal to fight against the Allies partitioning the Ottoman Empire after it was defeated in World War I. A second-lieutenant in the 45th regiment of the 15th division, he fought in the western Anatolian region of Afyon and took part in the recapturing of İzmir from Greek troops on 9 September 1922.

Following the declaration of the republic in 1923, Birgöl returned to his unit at the Black Sea city of Samsun, where he stayed until 1928. While he was stationed in Sarıkamış, Bayburt and Muğla, he was active in some campaigns against rebellions that took place following the Independence War. Later, he served in Çanakkale, Ezine and Gelibolu. He retired from the army on 13 September 1952, with the rank of colonel. Birgöl was awarded in 1927 the Medal of Independence with red ribbon.

He died on 11 November 2008, aged 105, at the GATA Haydarapaşa Military Hospital in Istanbul. As the last veteran of the Independence War, he was honored with a state funeral held on November 13 at the Turkish Parliament in Ankara, attended by President Abdullah Gül, Parliament Speaker Köksal Toptan, Chief of the General Staff Gen. İlker Başbuğ, leaders of the main opposition parties in the parliament and statesmen, politicians and other high-level officials. His remains were brought to Istanbul and interred on 14 November at Karacaahmet Cemetery following a religious ceremony at Selimiye Mosque next to the Selimiye Barracks.

== See also ==
- Son Buluşma (Turkish documentary film, 2007)
