= Veysel Turan =

Turkish war veteran

Veysel Turan (1899 - 25 March 2007) was one of the last Turkish veterans of the Turkish War of Independence (1919–1923).

== Military years ==
He joined the newly established army of Mustafa Kemal Pasha in Ankara. In the early period of the Turkish War of Independence (1919–1923), he carried grain from various places of the country to the soldiers in the west front. Following the Greek Summer Offensive in 1920, he was assigned to a military hospital in Kütahya. He then fought in clashes near Polatlı. He remembers that "they had to bury the fallen in night in order not to demoralize their comrades". After the retreat of the Greek troops, he received a horse, and became a cavalryman in the combat assault battalion of the 1st Division. Subsequently, he took part in the Second Battle of İnönü (1921), Battle of Sakarya (1921) and Battle of Dumlupınar (1922).

== Later years ==
In his later years, Tuyrma earned his living by farming. He lived nearly 25 years bedridden at Aydınlıkevler neighborhood of Selçuklu district in Konya Province, where was he was cared by his daughter Samiye Turan. He underwent surgeries of kidney and prostate in different times and then in August 2005 an inguinal hernia surgery.

Veysel Turan had two sons and five daughters. He died at the age of 107 in Konya on 25 March 2007. He was survived by his daughter Samiye Turan.
