= Last European veterans by war =

This is an incomplete list of the last surviving European veterans of several wars. The last surviving veteran of any particular war, upon his death, marks the end of a historic era. Exactly who is the last surviving veteran is often an issue of contention, especially with records from wars which happened long ago. The "last man standing" was often very young at the time of enlistment and in many cases had lied about his age to gain entry into the service, which confuses matters further.

== Early modern period ==
These cases, particularly with respect to the ages claimed by the veterans, cannot be verified.

- Anton Grolekofsky (1671/1672?–1785) – Polish soldier who lived in Sweden. Claimed to have fought in the Nine Years' War, Russo-Swedish War (1741–43) and Polish-Swedish War.
- Andreas Nielsen (1660?–1782) – Norwegian soldier. Claimed to be the last Scanian War veteran, to have had a long military career and seen many battles.
- Christian Jacobsen Drakenberg (1626?–1772) – Norwegian sailor. Claimed to have fought for Frederick III of Denmark in the Dano-Swedish War (1657–58) and again from 1675 to 1681 in the Scanian War.

== 17th century ==
=== English Civil War (1642–51) ===
- William Hiseland (1620?–1732) – Royalist. Last survivor of the Battle of Edgehill. Also fought in the Williamite War in Ireland and the War of the Spanish Succession. Retired with rank of sergeant. For 80-year service to the king, he became one of the earliest admitted to Royal Hospital Chelsea.

== 18th century ==
=== Great Northern War (1700–21) ===
- Petro Kalnyshevsky (1690, or 1691?–1803) – Russia. Served in a Zaporozhian Cossacks Regiment. Also fought in 1735–39 and 1768–74 Russo-Turkish Wars (by which time he was an Ataman).
- Abraham Lindqvist (1696–1801) – Sweden. Served as a Dragoon under Charles XII.

=== War of the Spanish Succession (1701–14) ===
- Ambrose Bennett (or Tennant) (1693/94–1800) – Great Britain. Served at the Battle of Malplaquet and reputedly died at the age of 106.

=== Jacobite risings (1719–45) ===
- Peter Grant (1714?–1824) – Jacobite. Fought at Culloden, Falkirk Muir and Prestonpans.

=== War of the Polish Succession (1733–35) ===
- Jean Thurel (1699–1807) – France. Also served in the War of the Austrian Succession, Seven Years' War and the American Revolutionary War. Known as "the oldest soldier of Europe."

=== Russo-Turkish wars (1735–74) ===
- Petro Kalnyshevsky (1691?–1803) – Zaporozhian Cossacks. Also fought in Great Northern War and Russo-Turkish War (1768–1774) (by which time he was an Ataman).

=== War of the Austrian Succession (1740–48) ===
- Johann Georg Sauer (1713– 1818 ) – Dutch Republic. Also served in the Revolutionary Wars.
- Jean Thurel (1698–1807) – France. Also served in the War of the Polish Succession, Seven Years' War, and the American Revolutionary War. Known as "the oldest soldier of Europe."

=== Seven Years' War (1754–63) ===
- Johann Heinrich Behrens (1735–1844) – Prussia. Died in Wolfenbüttel.
- Ezekiel Blackmarr (1742–1841) – Great Britain. Born in the American colonies. Enlisted in British forces and was their last survivor of the Battle of Havana (1762).
- László Skultéty (1738–1831) – Hungary.
- Paul François de Quelen de la Vauguyon (1746–1828) – France. Died in Paris.

=== French Revolution (1789–99) ===
- Nicolas Savin (1768/1787?–1894) – France. Enlisted in 2nd Regiment of Hussars in 1798. 1768 figure proclaims he was approximately 126 at time of death. Later served under Napoleon and was awarded the Legion d'Honneur.
- Giovanni Battista Campanella (1776?–1884) – France. Served in Italy during the French Revolutionary Wars and later in the 1812 Russian campaign.
- Arthur Dardenne (1776–1872) – France. Last surviving person to have taken part in the Storming of the Bastille.

== 19th century ==
=== Napoleonic Wars (1803–15) ===
- Vincent Markiewicz (1795?–1903) – France. Last Polish veteran. Fought for Napoleon. In 1912 there were three Polish men who claimed to have fought at Borodino, but it is unlikely they were real veterans due to lack of documentation and age ranges relatively high from 120 to 133.
- August Friedrich Schmidt (1795–1899) – Prussia. Last German veteran. Enlisted in March 1813 and is a candidate for last veteran of the Battle of Waterloo.
- Geert Adriaans Boomgaard (1788–1899) – France. Last Dutch veteran and verified veteran. Europe's oldest man at the time of his death. He fought for Napoleon in the 33ème Régiment Léger.
- Louis-Victor Baillot (1793–1898) – France. Last French veteran of the Battle of Waterloo. Also saw action at siege of Hamburg.
- Henry James (1799–1898) – United Kingdom. Last Royal Navy veteran. Enlisted in 1812 and served on HMS Pompee. Saw action off Toulon.
- Lars Jespersen Kike (1796–1897) – Norway. Last Norwegian veteran of the Swedish–Norwegian War.
- Leonard Meesters (1796–1896) – France. Last Belgian veteran. Fought for Napoleon.
- Josephine Mazurkewicz (1794–1896) – France. Last female veteran. Assistant surgeon in Napoleon's army. Later partook in Crimean War.
- Ferdinand Scharnhorst (1797?–1893) – United Kingdom. Last British Army participant of Waterloo. Served in the King's German Legion.
- Gaspar Costela Vasquez (1787–1892) – Spain. Last veteran of the Battle of Trafalgar. Served in the navy aboard Spanish ship Santa Ana.
- Vasilij Nikolaevich Kochetkov (1785?–1892) – Russia. Enlisted 7 March 1811. Served in Grenadier Lifeguard Regiment at Borodino. Served 66 1/2 years until 12 October 1877 when wounded out of service in the Russian-Ottoman War.
- Joseph Sutherland (1789–1890) – United Kingdom. Served in the Royal Navy on HMS Beaulieu and was the last British survivor of Trafalgar.
- Wilhelm I, German Emperor (1797–1888) – Prussia. Last monarch to have fought in the Napoleonic Wars. Served as an officer during the Battle of Bar-sur-Aube and at the Battle of Paris.

=== War of 1812 (1812–15) ===
- Lewis Tobias Jones (1797–1895) – United Kingdom. Served in the Royal Navy on HMS Medway. Participated in the 1814 capture of USS Syren. Also a Napoleonic Wars veteran.

=== Greek War of Independence (1821–32) ===
- John W. Stainer (1808–1907) – United Kingdom. Served in the Royal Navy on HMS Talbot. Last survivor of the Battle of Navarino.
- Apostolos Mavrogenis (1798?–1906) – Greece. Served in the Army as a doctor. Served at Dervenakia and Drampala.
- Louis Pèlabon (1814–1906) – France. Served in the Navy on the Sirène. Fought at Navarino.

=== July Revolution (1830) ===
- Auguste Lebailly (1815–1911) – Orléanist.

=== Belgian Revolution (1830–31) ===
- Johannes van den Boom (1817–1918) – United Netherlands. Joined as a drummer boy at 14.
- Corstiaan Hagers (1811–1915) – United Netherlands. Last holder of the Metal Cross.
- Alexandre Fournier (1812–1914) – France.
- Jean-Philippe Lavalle (1809–1913) – Belgian Rebels.

=== First Opium War (1839–1842) ===
- John Bubeer (1820–1921) – United Kingdom. Served in the Royal Navy on HMS Endymion.

=== Hungarian Revolution of 1848 ===
- József Fischl (1827–1929) — Hungary. Served at Isaszeg and Segesvár.
- István Lebo (1826–1928) — Hungary. Last resident of the Hungarian Veterans Home.
- Artúr Görgey (1818–1916) — Hungary. Last Hungarian General.

=== Second Anglo-Sikh War (1848–49) ===
- John Stratford (1829–1932) — East India Company. Fought in the battles of Ramnagar, Challianwala, and Gujrat. Later served in the Anglo-Persian War as well as the Indian Mutiny.

=== First Schleswig War (1848–51) ===
- Jørgen Jørgensen Birkholm (1829–1931) — Denmark.
- Detlef Marxen (1826–1930) — Germany.

=== Crimean War (1853–56) ===
- James Gray (1836–1939) — British Empire. Served in the Royal Marine Artillery aboard HMS Hawke.
- Yves Prigent (1833–1937) — French Empire. Served in the Navy on the frigate Persévérante.
- Cotton Edwin Theobald (1836–1936) — British Empire. Officer of the 55th Foot. Possibly last British officer. Also served in the Indian Mutiny and on the North-West Frontier.
- Edwin Bezar (1838–1936) — British Empire. Hostilities had ceased by the time he arrived; he worked on re-interring the dead and building cemetery walls. Also served in the New Zealand Wars.
- Luigi Parachini (c. 1832–1930) — Sardinia. Served under General La Màrmora.
- Edwin Hughes (1830–1927) — British Empire. Last survivor of Charge of the Light Brigade.

=== Indian Mutiny (1857–59) ===
- Charles Palmer (1847–1940) — British Empire. Nine-year-old boy who participated in the Siege of Lucknow.
- George Chrystie (1841–1939) — British Empire. Last British Army veteran.

=== Second Italian War of Independence (1859) ===
- Anton Neubauer (1836–1941) — Austrian Empire. Last survivor of the Battle of Solferino.
- Simone Piffaretti (1843?–1940) — Italy. Fought at San Fermo, Magenta, and Solferino.
- François Ribet (1835–1936) — French Empire.
- William John Newby (1832–1934) — British Empire. Last member of British Legion.

=== American Civil War (1861–1865) ===
- William Peter (1849–1951) — Union. Born in Germany.
- Jeremiah William Patrick O'Brien (1844–1950) — Confederate States. Born in Ireland.

=== French invasion of Mexico (1861–67) ===
- Jules Pujos (1846–1942) – French Empire.

=== January Uprising (1863–65) ===
- Feliks Bartczuk (1846–1946) – Poland.
- Antoni Suss (1844–1946) – Poland. Penultimate veteran.

=== Second Schleswig War (1864) ===
- Ludwig Herman Klein (1846–1943) – Denmark. Last Naval veteran. Served on the Geiser.
- Ove Henning Jacobsen (1841–1941) – Denmark. Last Army veteran. Fought at Dybbøl.

=== Expedition to Abyssinia (1867–68) ===
- Adrian Jones (1845–1938) – British Empire. Served as veterinary officer, believed to be last British survivor. Also served in First Boer War and Nile Expedition.

=== Franco-Prussian War (1870–71) ===
- Seraphin Pruvost (1849–1955) – France.
- Karl Glöckner (1845–1953) – Germany.

=== Paris Commune (1871) ===
- Adrien Lejeune (1847–1942) – Communards. Last Communard.
- Antoine Desfarges (1851–1941) – Communards. Last député.
- Eugène François Louis Liné (1850–1940) – France.

=== Third Anglo-Ashanti War (1873–74) ===
- Harry Figg (1855–1953) – British Empire. Died in Sydney, Australia. Also served in the Zulu War, First Boer War and Second Boer War.

=== Russo-Turkish War (1877–78) ===
- Fedor Ivanovich Taranov (1855–1960) – Imperial Russian Army
- Nene Hatun (1858–1955) – Ottoman Empire. Fought at the Battle of Erzurum.
- Mikhail Promtov (1857–1951) – Imperial Russian Army.

=== Second Anglo-Afghan War (1878–80) ===
- Alfred Hawker (1858–1962) – British Empire. Served in the British Army.

=== Zulu War (1879) ===
- Harry Figg (1855–1953) – British Empire.
- Charles Wallace Warden (c.1854–1953) – British Empire. Transferred to First Foot in 1874.
- Frank Bourne (1854–1945) – British Empire. Last survivor of Rorke's Drift.

=== First Boer War (1880–81) ===
- Harry Figg (1855–1953) – British Empire. Fought at Majuba Hill and Laing's Nek. Previously served in the 1873 Ashanti War and the Anglo-Zulu War.

=== Anglo-Egyptian War (1882) ===
- Albert Canning (1861–1960) – British Empire. Served in the 19th Hussars. Also served in the Mahdist War and World War I.

=== Mahdist War (1882–99) ===
- James Richard Miles (1879–1977) – British Empire. Last British Army veteran of the Battle of Omdurman.

=== Spanish–American War (1898) ===
- Aurelio Diaz Campillo (1878–1989) – Spain. Served in the Army.
- Emilio Fabregat Fabregat (1878–1960) – Spain. Last survivor of the Siege of Baler.

== 20th century ==
=== Second Boer War (1899–1902) ===
- George Frederick Ives (1881–1993) – British Empire. Later emigrated to Canada.

=== Russo-Japanese War (1904–05) ===
- Alex Gory (1881–1989) – Russian Empire.

=== Macedonian Struggle (1904–08) ===
- Christos Papantoniou (1890–1995) – Greece.

=== Potemkin Mutiny (1905) ===
- Ivan Beshoff (1885–1987) – Potemkin rebels. Fled to Ireland in 1913.

=== Italo-Turkish War (1911–12) ===
- Michele Traini (1892–1996) – Italy. Sent to Libya in 1912. Returned home following WWI.

=== Balkan Wars (1912–13) ===
- Dumitrașcu Lăcătușu (1891–1999) – Romania. Served in the 11th Siret Regiment in 1913. Also served in WWI and WWII.
- Christos Papantoniou (1890–1995) – Greece. Also served in WWI and WWII.
- Hristo Getov-Obbov (1893–1994) – Bulgaria. Joined the Macedonian-Adrianopolitan Volunteer Corps in 1912. Also served in WWI.
- Hüseyin Kaçmaz (1884–1994) – Ottoman Empire. Also served in WWI.
- Danilo Dajković (1895–1993) – Montenegro. Also served in WWI.

=== World War I (1914–18) ===
- Florence Green (1901–2012) – British Empire. Last Entente veteran and last veteran of World War I. Served as an officer's mess steward in the Royal Air Force; the Women's Royal Air Force.
- Claude Choules (1901–2011) – British Empire. Last combat veteran. Served in the Royal Navy on HMS Revenge. Also last veteran to serve in both World Wars.
- Harry Patch (1898–2009) – British Empire. Last soldier to fight in the trenches.
- Franz Künstler (1900–2008) – Austria-Hungary. Last Central Powers veteran.
- Wilhelm Gisbert Groos (1894–1997) – German Empire. Last member of Jasta 11 and possibly last German flying ace of World War I

=== Easter Rising (1916) ===
- John "Jack" Rogers (1894–2000) – United Kingdom. Served in the Sherwood Foresters. Also served in WWI.
- Frederick Watson (1900–1997) – United Kingdom. Served in the Royal Dublin Fusiliers.
- Lily Kempson (1897–1996) – Irish rebels. Served in the Irish Citizen Army.
- William Conor Hogan (1898–1995) – Irish rebels. Served in the Irish Volunteers. Also served in the War of Independence and the Civil War.

=== October Revolution (1917) ===
- Boris Gudz (1902–2006) – Red Army. Also fought in Russian Civil War.

=== Russian Civil War (1917–22) ===
Russian participants:

- Anatoly A. Wolin (1902–2007) – Red Army.
- Boris Gudz (1902–2006) – Red Army. Also fought in October Revolution.
- Nikolai Fyodorov (1901–2003) – White Army.

European veterans of Allied Intervention:

- Alois Vocásek (1896–2003) – Czechoslovakia. Fought as a Legionnaire throughout Siberia on the Trans-Siberian Railway.
- Jean Piry (1896–2003) – France.
- Frank William Ivers (1902–2003) – United Kingdom. Last Naval veteran. Served in Royal Navy off Northern Russia.

=== Finnish Civil War (1918) ===
- Lauri Nurminen (1906–2009) – White Guards.
- Aarne Arvonen (1897–2009) – Red Guards.

=== Greater Poland Uprising (1918–1919) ===
- Jan Rzepa (1899–2005) – Poland.

=== German Revolution of 1918–19 ===
- Helmut Fink (1901–2009) – Weimar Republic. Served in the Freikorps.

=== Polish–Ukrainian War (1918–19) ===
- Grigory Ivanovich Kovpak (1905–2010) – Ukraine. Served in the Ukrainian Galician Army.
- Aleksander Sałacki (1904–2008) – Poland. Last Lwów Eaglet.

=== Estonian War of Independence (1918–20) ===
- Ants Ilus (1901–2006) – Estonia.
- Paavo Takula (1901–2004) – Finland. Last volunteer.
- Karl Jaanus (1899–2000) – Estonia. Last surviving Cross of Liberty recipient awarded during war.

=== Latvian War of Independence (1918–20) ===
- Arnolds Hofmanis (1900–2006) – Latvia. Died in Tukums, Latvia.
- Arvīds Lauris (1901–2003) – Latvia. Last surviving Order of Lāčplēsis recipient awarded during war.

=== Lithuanian Wars of Independence (1918–20) ===
- Kazys Varkala (1900–2005) – Lithuania. Fought against the Soviets and the Bermontians.
- Česlovas Januškevičius (1900–2001) – Lithuania. Last surviving Cross of Vytis recipient awarded during war. Fought the Polish in 1920.

=== Irish War of Independence (1919–21) ===
- Dan Keating (1902–2007) – Ireland. Served in the Irish Republican Army.
- Bert Clark (1899–2005) – United Kingdom. Served in the British Army.
- Hugh McIvor (1901–2002) – United Kingdom. Last member of the Royal Irish Constabulary.

=== Polish–Soviet War (1918–19) ===
- Alexander Imich (1903–2014) – Poland.
- Józef Kowalski (1900–2013) – Poland.

=== Silesian Uprisings (1919–21) ===
- Wilhelm Meisel (1904–2009) – Silesian rebels.

=== Turkish War of Independence (1919–23) ===
- Mustafa Şekip Birgöl (1903–2008) – Turkey.

=== Greco-Turkish War (1919–22) ===
- Veysel Turan (1901–2007) – Turkey.
- Napoleon Patricios (1899–2006) – Greece. Served on board the destroyer Ierax.

=== Rif War (1920–1926) ===
- Francisco Núñez Olivera (1904–2018) – Spain.

=== March on Rome (1922) ===
- Vasco Bruttomesso (1903–2009) – National Fascist Party.

=== Spanish Civil War (1936–1939) ===
- Josep Almudéver Mateu (1919–2021) – Spain. Last veteran of the International Brigades.
- Günther Scholz (1911–2014) – Germany. Last veteran of the Condor Legion.

=== 1936 Naval Revolt ===
- José Júnior Barata (1916–2014) – Portuguese Navy rebels.

=== World War II (1939–45) ===
- John Hemingway (1919–2025) – United Kingdom. Last veteran of the Battle of Britain. Served with No. 85 Squadron RAF.
- John Cruickshank (1920–2025) – United Kingdom. Last Victoria Cross recipient. Served in the British Army before joining the RAF in 1941.
- Kenneth Mayhew (1917–2021) – United Kingdom. Last Military Order of William recipient. Fought in the British Army at Normandy, Caen, Eindhoven–Arnhem, and Overloon.
- Rafael Gómez Nieto (1921–2020) – Free France. Last member of the 9th Company of 2nd Armored Division, the first Allied unit to enter Paris during the Liberation.

=== Korean War (1950–53) ===
- Sergey Kramarenko (1923–2020) – Soviet Union. Last surviving Soviet flying ace. Served in 324th Fighter Aviation Division. Soviet Air Force.
- Bill Speakman (1927–2018) – United Kingdom. Last Victoria Cross recipient. Served in the Black Watch, 3rd Battalion, Royal Regiment of Scotland, British Army.

== See also ==
- Military history of Europe
- List of last surviving veterans of military insurgencies and wars
- List of last surviving veterans of military operations
- List of last surviving Canadian war veterans
- Last surviving United States war veterans
