= List of last surviving veterans of military insurgencies and wars =

This a chronological list of the last surviving veterans of military insurgencies, conflicts and wars around the world. The listed wars span from the 13th century BC to the Korean War.

== Classical antiquity ==
- Ramesses II (1303–1213 BC) – Egyptian Pharaoh who, as a young man, fought many battles with the Hittites and Shardana pirates and died aged 90.
- Aristodemus of Sparta (c. 530–479 BC) – The "Coward of Thermopylae", who was the only Spartan to survive the Battle of Thermopylae.
- Marcus Valerius Corvus (370 BC?–270 BC) – Led the Roman army in the First Samnite War and reputedly lived to the age of 100.
- King Masinissa (c. 238 BC–c. 148 BC) – Led the Numidians during the Third Punic War and died at the age of 90.
- Zhao Tuo (240 BC–137 BC) – Alive during the Qin Dynasty conquest of Zhao. Participated in the conquest of the Baiyue and died at the age of 102.

== Middle Ages ==
=== Muslim–Quraysh Wars (622–630) ===
- Abu al-Yusr Ka'b ibn Amr (599–675) – Muslim. Last soldier to serve under Muhammad at the Battle of Badr.

=== Norman conquest of England (1066–1088) ===
- Robert de Beaumont, 1st Earl of Leicester (1040–1118) – Norman. Last nobleman proven to have fought alongside William the Conqueror at the Battle of Hastings.

== Early modern period ==
These cases, particularly with respect to the ages claimed by the veterans, cannot be verified as it was common in pre-industrialised societies for elders to exaggerate their age.

- Henry Jenkins (1501 (Unlikely) – 1670) – English longevity claimant. Claimed to have carried arrows for English archers at Battle of Flodden (1513) when aged 12.
- Anton Grolekofsky (1671/1672?–1785) – Polish soldier claiming to live 114 years who lived in Sweden. Claimed to have fought in the Nine Years' War, Russo-Swedish War (1741–43) and Polish-Swedish War.
- Andreas Nielsen (1660?–1782) – Norwegian soldier. Claimed, while unlikely to be the last Scanian War veteran, however he was known to have had a long military career and seen many battles.
- Christian Jacobsen Drakenberg (1626 (Unlikely) –1772) – Norwegian sailor. Claimed to have fought for Frederick III of Denmark-Norway in the Dano-Swedish War (1657–58) and again from 1675 to 1681 in the Scanian War.

== 17th century ==
=== Indian Wars (1622–1924) ===
- Otto D. Van Norman (1876–1981) – United States. Served in the local posse during the Battle of Kelley Creek.
- Frederick Fraske (1872–1973) – United States. Last Army veteran.
- Hubert V. Eva (1869–1971) – United States. Last participant of the Battle of Sugar Point, the last battle fought between Native Americans and the U.S. Army.
- John Daw (1870–1965) – United States. Last Indian Scout.
- Dewey Beard (1857–1955) – Lakota Tribe. Last Native American participant of the Battle of the Little Big Horn. Also survived Wounded Knee.
- David McCoy (1790–1895) – United States. Fought in Tecumseh's War. Saw Chief Tecumseh die while fighting in the Battle of the Thames. Served in the War of 1812.
- Josiah Allen (1800–1891) – United States. Enlisted at 14 to serve in the Creek War.

=== English Civil War (1642–1651) ===
- William Hiseland (1620?–1732) – Royalist. Last survivor of the Battle of Edgehill. Also fought in the Williamite War in Ireland and the War of the Spanish Succession. Retired with rank of sergeant. For 80-year service to the king, he became one of the earliest admitted to Royal Hospital Chelsea.
- John Read (1633–1730) – Parliamentarian. Joined Cromwell's army at 16 years old. Later emigrated to the American colonies and became a member of the Connecticut House of Representatives.

=== First Anglo-Dutch War (1652–1654) ===
- Richard Haddock (1629–1714) – Commonwealth of England. Served in the Royal Navy.

== 18th century ==
=== Great Northern War (1700–1721) ===
- Petro Kalnyshevsky (1690, or 1691?–1803) – Cossack Hetmanate, Ukraine. Served in a Zaporozhian Cossacks regiment. Also fought in 1735–39 and 1768–74 Russo-Turkish Wars (by which time he was an Ataman).
- Abraham Lindqvist (1696–1801) – Sweden. Served as a dragoon under Charles XII.

=== War of the Spanish Succession (1701–1714) ===
- Ambrose Bennett (or Tennant) (1693/94–1800) – Great Britain. Served at the Battle of Malplaquet (Alongside Hiseland) and reputedly died at the age of 106.

=== Jacobite risings (1719–1745) ===
- Peter Grant (1714?–1824) – Jacobite. Fought at Culloden, Falkirk Muir and Prestonpans.

=== War of the Polish Succession (1733–1738) ===
- Jean Thurel (1698?–1807) – France. Also served in the War of the Austrian Succession, the Seven Years' War and the American Revolutionary War. Known as "oldest soldier of Europe."

=== Russo-Turkish wars (1735–1774) ===
- Petro Kalnyshevsky (1691?–1803) – Zaporozhian Cossacks. Also fought in Great Northern War and Russo-Turkish War (1768–1774) (by which time he was an Ataman).

=== French and Indian War (1754–1763) ===
- John Owen (1741–1843) – Great Britain. Also fought in American Revolutionary War. Buried in Warren, Pennsylvania.
- David Thompson (1736–1836) – Great Britain. Last pensioner. Lost an arm at Fort William Henry. Later served in the American Revolution.
- Michel-Eustache-Gaspard-Alain Chartier de Lotbinière (1748–1822) – France. Died in Montreal, Quebec, British Empire.

=== Seven Years' War (1754–1763) ===
- Johann Heinrich Behrens (1735–1844) – Prussia. Died in Wolfenbüttel.
- Ezekiel Blackmarr (1742–1841) – Great Britain. Born in the American colonies. Enlisted in British forces and was their last survivor of the Battle of Havana.
- Paul François de Quelen de la Vauguyon (1746–1828) – France. Died in Paris.
- Andrei Timofeevich Bolotov- (Octeber 18,1738– October 16, 1833) – was a Russian army officer, memoirist, and pioneering agronomist. During the «Seven Years War» he fought as a second lieutenant at the Battle of Gross-Jagesdorf in 1757. He later served as a translator and adjutant at the Russian headgeartes in Konigsberg until his retirement in 1762.

=== American Revolutionary War (1775–1783) ===
- Daniel Bakeman (1759–1869) – United States. Alleged veteran. Awarded pension via Congress, though no support of service has been located.
- John Gray (1764–1868) – United States. Last verifiable veteran although period of service was too short for him for pension qualification.
- Lemuel Cook (1759–1866) – United States. Last official veteran; honorable discharge signed by George Washington.
- Jean-Baptiste Le Cour de Grandmaison (1759–1861) – France. French naval officer, privateer and arms manufacturer, served as a midshipman in the French navy during the war.

=== Inconfidência Mineira (1789) ===
- Padre Manuel Rodrigues da Costa (1754–1844) – Inconfidentes. Also participated in the Independence of Brazil and in the Liberal Rebellions of 1842.
- José de Resende Costa (1766–1841) – Inconfidentes.

=== French Revolution (1789–1799) ===
- Nicolas Savin (1786 or 1787–1894) – France. Claimed to have enlisted in 2nd Regiment of Hussars in 1798. 1768 figure proclaims he was approximately 126 at time of death. Later served under Napoleon and was awarded the Legion d'Honneur.
- Giovanni Battista Campanella (1776–1884) – France. Served in Italy during the French Revolutionary Wars and later in the 1812 Russian campaign.
- Arthur Dardenne (1776–1872) – France. Last surviving person to have taken part in the Storming of the Bastille.

=== Irish Rebellion of 1798 ===
- William Kinsella (1775–1870) – Irish rebel. Fought at Castlecomer.

== 19th century ==
=== Napoleonic Wars (1803–1815) ===
- Vincent Markiewicz (1795?–1903) – France. Claimed last Polish veteran. Known to have fought for Napoleon. However, in 1912 there were three Polish men who claimed to have fought at Borodino, but it is unlikely they were real veterans due to lack of documentation and improbable age ranges from 120 to 133.
- Geert Adriaans Boomgaard (1788–1899) – France. Last Dutch veteran and verified veteran. Europe's oldest man at the time of his death. He fought for Napoleon in the 33ème Régiment Léger.
- August Schmidt (1795–1899) – Prussia. Last surviving German and Prussian veteran of the conflict and also last surviving veteran of the battle of Waterloo of all nations participating. He fought in the Battle of Bautzen, Battle of Großbeeren, Battle of Dennewitz, Battle of Leipzig, Battle of Laon, and in the Battle of Waterloo.
- Louis Victor Baillot (1793–1898) – France. Last surviving French veteran of the Battle of Waterloo. Also saw action at siege of Hamburg.
- Henry James (1799–1898) – United Kingdom. Last Royal Navy veteran. Enlisted in 1812 and served on HMS Pompee. Saw action off Toulon.
- Lars Jespersen Kike (1796–1897) – Norway. Last Norwegian veteran of the Swedish–Norwegian War.
- Leonard Meesters (1796–1896) – France. Last Belgian veteran. Fought for Napoleon.
- Josephine Mazurkewicz (1794–1896) – France. Last female veteran. Assistant surgeon in Napoleon's army. Later partook in the Crimean War.
- Ferdinand Scharnhorst (1797?–1893) – United Kingdom. Last British Army participant of Waterloo. Served in the King's German Legion.
- Gaspar Costela Vázquez (1787–1892) – Spain. Last veteran of the Battle of Trafalgar. Served in the navy aboard the Spanish ship Santa Ana.
- Vasilij Nikolaevich Kochetkov (1785?–1892) – Russia. Enlisted 7 March 1811. Served in Grenadier Lifeguard Regiment at Borodino. Served 66 1/2 years until 12 October 1877 when wounded during service in the Russian-Ottoman War.
- Emmanuel Louis Cartigny (1791–1892) – France. Last French veteran of the Battle of Trafalgar.
- Joseph Sutherland (1789–1890) – United Kingdom. Served in the Royal Navy on HMS Beaulieu and was the last British survivor of Trafalgar.

=== War of 1812 (1812–1815) ===
- Hiram Cronk (1800–1905) – United States. Served in a New York Infantry Regiment.
- Lewis Tobias Jones (1797–1895) – United Kingdom. Served in the Royal Navy on HMS Medway. Participated in the 1814 capture of USS Syren. Also a Napoleonic Wars veteran.

=== Seminole Wars (1816–1858) ===
- Jacob C. Marsh (c. 1818–1917) – United States. Last participant of the Second Seminole War.

=== Greek War of Independence (1821–1832) ===
- John W. Stainer (1808–1907) – United Kingdom. Served in the Royal Navy on HMS Talbot. Last survivor of the Battle of Navarino.
- Apostolos Mavrogenis (1798–1906) – Greece. Served in the Army as a doctor. Served at Dervenakia and Drampala.
- Louis Pèlabon (1814–1906) – France. Served in the Navy on the Sirène. Fought at Navarino.

=== July Revolution (1830) ===
- Auguste Lebailly (1815–1911) – Orléanist.

=== Belgian Revolution (1830–1831) ===
- Johannes van den Boom (1817–1918) – United Netherlands. Joined as a drummer boy at 14.
- Corstiaan Hagers (1811–1915) – United Netherlands. Last holder of the Metal Cross.
- Alexandre Fournier (1812–1914) – France.
- Jean-Philippe Lavalle (1809–1913) – Belgian Rebels.

=== Black Hawk War (1832) ===
- Henry L. Riggs (1812–1911) – United States.

=== Texas War of Independence (1835–1836) ===
- William Physick Zuber (1820–1913) – Texas. Last veteran of the Battle of San Jacinto.
- Benjamin Franklin Highsmith (1817–1905) – Texas. Courier at the Alamo.

=== Ragamuffin War (1835–1845) ===
- Anísio Manoel de Souza (1822–1938) – Riograndense Republic. Later served in the Paraguayan War. Oldest soldier in Brazilian Army history.

=== Rebellions of 1837–1838 ===
- Samuel Filgate (1818–1919) – United Kingdom.
- Nelson Truax (1818–1915) – Hunters' Lodges. Fought at the Windmill.
- François X. Matthieu (1818–1914) – Parti Patriote.

=== First Opium War (1839–1842) ===
- John Bubeer (1820–1921) – United Kingdom. Served in the Royal Navy on HMS Endymion.

=== Mexican–American War (1846–1848) ===
- Owen Thomas Edgar (1831–1929) – United States. Served on the USS Potomac and USS Allegheny.
- Antonio Rincón Gallardo (c. 1833–1928) – Mexico. Enlisted at 13 years old and served at Churubusco in 1847.

=== Hungarian Revolution of 1848 ===
- József Fischl (1827–1929) — Hungary. Served at Isaszeg and Segesvár.
- István Lebo (1826–1928) — Hungary. Last resident of the Hungarian Veterans Home.
- Artúr Görgey (1818–1916) — Hungary. Last Hungarian General. Survived to World War I when German Imperial Soldiers would honor him for his fight against the Russian Empire.

=== Second Anglo-Sikh War (1848–1849) ===
- John Stratford (1829–1932) — East India Company. Fought in the battles of Ramnagar, Challianwala, and Gujrat. Later served in the Anglo-Persian War as well as the Indian Mutiny.

=== First Schleswig War (1848–1851) ===
- Jørgen Jørgensen Birkholm (1829–1931) — Denmark.
- Detlef Marxen (1826–1930) — Germany.

=== Crimean War (1853–1856) ===
- James Gray (1836–1939) — British Empire. Last veteran. Served in the Royal Marine Artillery aboard HMS Hawke.
- Yves Prigent (1833–1937) — French Empire. Served in the Navy on the frigate Persévérante.
- Cotton Edwin Theobald (1836–1936) — British Empire. Officer of the 55th Foot. Last British officer. Also served in the Indian Mutiny and on the North-West Frontier.
- Edwin Bezar (1838–1936) — British Empire. Hostilities had ceased by the time he arrived; he worked on re-interring the dead and building cemetery walls. Also served in the New Zealand Wars.
- Peter Ongley (1836–1931) — British Empire. Served in the 46th Regt, having joined 1 November 1854. Took part in the storming of the Redan, and fall of Sebastopol. Later served in Corfu and India. Died at Reading, December 1931
- Luigi Parachini (c. 1832 – 1930) — Sardinia. Served under General La Màrmora.
- Edwin Hughes (1830–1927) — British Empire. Last survivor of Charge of the Light Brigade.

=== Eureka Rebellion (1854) ===
- William Edward Atherdon (1838–1934) — Stockade rebels.

=== Indian Rebellion (1857–1859) ===
- Charles Palmer (1847–1940) — British Empire. Nine-year-old boy who participated in the Siege of Lucknow.
- George Chrystie (1841–1939) — British Empire. Last British Army veteran.

=== New Zealand Wars (1845–1872) ===
- Thomas Baker (1853–1948) — British Empire. Served in the Armed Constabulary.
- Te Huia Raureti (c.1840–1935) — Māori. Kīngitanga Warrior. Served under Chief Rewi Maniapoto in the defence of Ōrākau Pā.

=== Second Italian War of Independence (1859) ===
- Anton Neubauer (1836–1941) — Austrian Empire. Last survivor of the Battle of Solferino.
- Simone Piffaretti (1843?–1940) — Italy. Fought at San Fermo, Magenta, and Solferino.
- François Ribet (1835–1936) — French Empire.
- William John Newby (1832–1934) — British Empire. Last member of the British Legion.

=== Expedition of the Thousand (1860–1861) ===
- Giovanni Battista Egisto Sivelli (1843–1934) — Red Shirts. Also fought in the Third War of Independence.

=== American Civil War (1861–1865) ===
==== Union ====
- Albert Woolson (1850–1956)

==== Confederacy ====
- William Daniel Townsend (1846–1953)

=== French invasion of Mexico (1861–1867) ===
- Jules Pujos (1846–1942) – French Empire.
- Francisco Arellano Zenteno (1842–1935) – Mexico. Fought at the battles of Puebla, La Carbonera and Tuxtepec. Previously served in the Reform War.

=== January Uprising (1863–1865) ===
- Feliks Bartczuk (1846–1946) – Poland.

=== Second Schleswig War (1864) ===
- Ludwig Herman Klein (1846–1943) – Denmark. Last Naval veteran. Served on the Geiser.
- Ove Henning Jacobsen (1841–1941) – Denmark. Last Army veteran. Fought at Dybbøl.

=== Paraguayan War (1864–1870) ===
- Manuel Domecq García (1859–1951) – Paraguayan Army. Fought as a ten-year-old child soldier in the battle of Acosta Ñu.
- Pedro Guedes do Amaral (1846–1954) – Brazilian Army. Later served in the Federalist Revolution and in the War of Canudos.
- Pedro Hahn (1850–1949) – Brazilian Army. Last German-Brazilian veteran.

=== Fenian raids (1866–1871) ===
- Henry Bayles Hooke (1849–1954) – Canada. Fought in the raid of 1866 at Ridgeway.
- William Craig (1850–1951) – Canada. Fought in the raids of 1870–71.

=== Expedition to Abyssinia (1867–1868) ===
- Adrian Jones (1845–1938) – British Empire. Served as veterinary officer, believed to be last British survivor. Also served in First Boer War and Nile Expedition.

=== Franco-Prussian War (1870–1871) ===
- Seraphin Pruvost (1849–1955) – France.
- Karl Glöckner (1845–1953) – Germany.

=== Paris Commune (1871) ===
- Adrien Lejeune (1847–1942) – Communards. Last Communard.
- Antonin Desfarges (1851–1941) – Communards. Last député.
- Eugène François Louis Liné (1850–1940) – France.

=== Third Anglo-Ashanti War (1873–1874) ===
- Harry Figg (1855–1953) – British Empire. Died in Sydney, Australia. Also served in the Zulu War, First Boer War and Second Boer War.

=== Russo-Turkish War (1877–1878) ===
- Fedor Ivanovich Taranov (1855–1960) – Imperial Russian Army
- Nene Hatun (1857–1955) – Ottoman Empire. Fought at the Battle of Erzurum.
- Mikhail Promtov (1857–1951) – Imperial Russian Army.

=== Second Anglo-Afghan War (1878–1880) ===
- Alfred Hawker (1858–1962) – British Empire. Served in the British Army.

=== Zulu War (1879) ===
- Harry Figg (1855–1953) – British Empire.
- Charles Wallace Warden (c.1854–1953) – British Empire. Transferred to First Foot in 1874.
- Frank Bourne (1854–1945) – British Empire. Last survivor of Rorke's Drift.

=== War of the Pacific (1879–1884) ===
- Ricardo Orellana Olate (1860–1967) – Chile.
- Manuel Elías Bonnemaison Torres (1862–1961) – Peru. Served in the Navy on the Huáscar. Fought at Angamos.

=== First Boer War (1880–1881) ===
- Jacob "Jaap" Coetzer (1866–1969) – South African Republic. Boer veteran, served at the Battle of Majuba Hill.
- Thomas Jelley (1859–1955) – British Empire. Fought at Majuba Hill.

=== Anglo-Egyptian War (1882) ===
- Albert Canning (1861–1960) – British Empire. Served in the 19th Hussars. Also served in the Mahdist War and World War I.

=== Mahdist War (1882–1899) ===
- James Richard Miles (1879–1977) – British Empire. Last British Army veteran of the Battle of Omdurman.
- Babiker Bedri (1856–1954) – Mahdist Sudan. Mahdist Sudanese warrior and later social activist who pioneered women's education in Sudan. He was the last surviving Mahdist veteran of the Mahdist War and the Battle of Omdurman.

=== Nile Expedition (1884–1885) ===
- Edward Hyde Hamilton Gordon (1861–1955) – British Empire. Last officer.

=== North-West Rebellion (1885) ===
- William Dickie Mills (1866–1971) – Canada. Fought at Fish Creek and Batoche.
- Jean Dumont (1858–1961) – Provisional Government of Saskatchewan. Fought at Batoche. Nephew of Gabriel Dumont.

=== Second Franco-Dahomean War (1892–1894) ===
- Nawi (c. 1879–1979) – Dahomey. Last Dahomey Amazon.

=== Cuban War of Independence (1895–1898) ===
- Juan Fajardo Vega (1881–1990) – Cuban rebels. Later served in the 1912 Negro Rebellion and the Cuban Revolution.

=== War of Canudos (1896–1897) ===
- José Ciríaco de Santana (1872–1974) – Canudos inhabitants.
- Honório Vila Nova (1864–1969) – Canudos inhabitants. Later served in the Revolt of Juazeiro.

=== Spanish–American War (1898) ===
- Jones Morgan (1882–1993) – United States. Served in the U.S. Cavalry.
- Aurelio Díaz Campillo (1878–1989) – Spain. Served in the Army.
- Archibald M. Forbis (1878–1981) – United States. Served in the U.S. Navy on USS McCulloch. Last Navy survivor of the Battle of Manila Bay.

=== Second Boer War (1899–1902) ===
- George Frederick Ives (1881–1993) – British Empire. Last British veteran. Later emigrated to Canada.
- James Gordon Williams (1880–1988) – British Empire. Last Australian veteran. Later served in First World War and attempted to enlist for the Second World War but was rejected because he was too old.
- Pieter Arnoldus Krueler (1885–1986) – South African Republic. Later served in both world wars, the Spanish Civil War, and was a mercenary in the Congo Crisis.

=== Philippine–American War (1899–1902) ===
- Nathan E. Cook (1885–1992) – United States. Served in the Navy on USS Pensacola.
- Walter Pleate (1876–1985) — United States. Served in the Army.

=== Boxer Rebellion (1899–1901) ===
- Nathan E. Cook (1885–1992) – United States. Served in the Navy.
- Walter Pleate (1876–1985) — United States. Served in the Army.

== 20th century ==
=== Russo-Japanese War (1904–1905) ===
- Mamoru Eto (1883–1992) – Empire of Japan.
- Alex Gory (1881–1989) – Russian Empire.

=== Macedonian Struggle (1904–1908) ===
- Christos Papantoniou (1890–1995) – Greece.

=== Potemkin Mutiny (1905) ===
- Ivan Beshoff (1885–1987) – Potemkin rebels. Fled to Ireland in 1913.

=== Revolt of the Lash (1910) ===
- João Cândido (1880–1969) – Leader and last known rebel. Also served in the Federalist Revolution.

=== Mexican Revolution (1910–1920) ===
- Guillermo Flores Reyes (1898–2014) – Villista.
- Juan Carlos Caballero Vega (1900–2010) – Villistas. Pancho Villa's driver.
- Feliciano Mejia Acevedo (1899–2008) – Zapatistas.
- Antonio Gómez Delgado (1900–2007) – Villistas.
- Rafael Lorenzana (1899–2000) – Carrancistas. Became a Villista in 1915 after being captured.
- Teodoro García (1889–1999) – Federales. Fought for Díaz from 1910 to 1911.

=== Xinhai Revolution (1911–1912) ===
- Yu Yuzhi (1889–1993) – Tongmenghui. Last participant of the Wuchang Uprising. Also served in the Defense of Yangxia.

=== Italo-Turkish War (1911–1912) ===
- Michele Traini (1892–1996) – Italy. Sent to Libya in 1912. Returned home following WWI.

=== Balkan Wars (1912–1913) ===
- Dumitrașcu Lăcătușu (1891–1999) – Romania. Served in the 11th Siret Regiment in 1913. Also served in WWI and WWII.
- Christos Papantoniou (1890–1995) – Greece. Also served in WWI and WWII.
- Hristo Getov-Obbov (1893–1994) – Bulgaria. Joined the Macedonian-Adrianopolitan Volunteer Corps in 1912. Also served in WWI.
- Hüseyin Kaçmaz (1884–1994) – Ottoman Empire. Also served in WWI.
- Danilo Dajković (1895–1993) – Montenegro. Also served in WWI.

=== Contestado War (1912–1916) ===
- Altino Bueno da Silva (1903–2014) – Last rebellious child and witness of the slaughter.
- Firmino Rodrigues Martim (1894–c.2000) – Brazilian Army (vaqueanos).

=== World War I (1914–1918) ===
- Florence Green (1901–2012) – British Empire. Last Entente veteran and last veteran of World War I. Served as an officer's mess steward in the Royal Air Force; the Women's Royal Air Force.
- Claude Choules (1901–2011) – British Empire. Last combat veteran. Served in the Royal Navy on HMS Revenge. Also last veteran to serve in both World Wars.
- Harry Patch (1898–2009) – British Empire. Last soldier to fight in the trenches.
- Franz Künstler (1900–2008) – Austria-Hungary. Last Central Powers veteran.
- Jiroemon Kimura (1897–2013) – Empire of Japan. Served in the Imperial Japanese Army Telegraph Corps in Tokyo in 1918. Could be considered the last veteran of World War I and last Entente veteran, but is not widely recognized as such.
- Mikhail Krichevsky (1897–2008) – Russian Empire. Last living veteran of the Russian Empire overall and in Ukraine.
- Dmitry Malozemov (1897–1998) – Russian Empire. Last living veteran in Russia.

=== Easter Rising (1916) ===
- John "Jack" Rogers (1894–2000) – United Kingdom. Served in the Sherwood Foresters. Also served in WWI.
- Frederick Watson (1900–1997) – United Kingdom. Served in the Royal Dublin Fusiliers.
- Lily Kempson (1897–1996) – Irish Republic. Served in the Irish Citizen Army.
- William Conor Hogan (1898–1995) – Irish Republic. Served in the Irish Volunteers. Also served in the War of Independence and the Civil War.

=== October Revolution (1917) ===
- Boris Gudz (1902–2006) – Red Army. Also fought in the Russian Civil War.

=== Russian Civil War (1917–1922) ===
Russian participants:

- Vladimir Shostak (1905–2010) – White Army. Also fought in World War II with the First Russian National Army.
- Anatoly A. Wolin (1902–2007) – Red Army.
- Boris Gudz (1902–2006) – Red Army. Also fought in October Revolution.
- Igor Talysin (1898–2004) – White Army.
- Nikolai Fyodorov (1901–2003) – White Army.

Veterans of Allied Intervention:

- Yasuichi Sasaki (1898–2006) – Japan. Discharged as a Corporal in 1920.
- Warren V. Hileman (1901–2005) – United States. Stationed in Vladivostok.
- Harold Edwin Radford (1897–2003) – Canada. Stationed in Vladivostok.
- Alois Vocásek (1896–2003) – Czechoslovakia. Fought as a Legionnaire throughout Siberia on the Trans-Siberian Railway.
- Jean Piry (1896–2003) – France.
- Frank William Ivers (1902–2003) – United Kingdom. Last Naval veteran. Served in Royal Navy off Northern Russia.
- Harold Gunnes (1899–2003) – United States. Last veteran of the Polar Bear Expedition. Saw action against the Bolsheviks on USS Olympia in 1918.

=== Finnish Civil War (1918) ===
- Lauri Nurminen (1906–2009) – White Guards.
- Aarne Arvonen (1897–2009) – Red Guards.

=== Greater Poland Uprising (1918–1919) ===
- Jan Rzepa (1899–2005) – Poland.

=== German Revolution of 1918–1919 ===
- Helmut Fink (1901–2009) – Weimar Republic. Served in the Freikorps.

=== Polish–Ukrainian War (1918–1919) ===
- Grigory Ivanovich Kovpak (1905–2010) – Ukraine. Served in the Ukrainian Galician Army.
- Aleksander Sałacki (1904–2008) – Poland. Last Lwów Eaglet.

=== Estonian War of Independence (1918–1920) ===
- Ants Ilus (1901–2006) – Estonia.
- Paavo Takula (1901–2004) – Finland. Last volunteer.
- Karl Jaanus (1899–2000) – Estonia. Last surviving Cross of Liberty recipient awarded during war.

=== Latvian War of Independence (1918–1920) ===
- Arnolds Hofmanis (1900–2006) – Latvia. Died in Tukums, Latvia.
- Arvīds Lauris (1901–2003) – Latvia. Last surviving Order of Lāčplēsis recipient awarded during war.

=== Lithuanian Wars of Independence (1918–1920) ===
- Kazys Varkala (1900–2005) – Lithuania. Fought against the Soviets and the Bermontians.
- Česlovas Januškevičius (1900–2001) – Lithuania. Last surviving Cross of Vytis recipient awarded during war. Fought the Polish in 1920.

=== Irish War of Independence (1919–1921) ===
- Dan Keating (1902–2007) – Ireland. Served in the Irish Republican Army.
- Bert Clark (1899–2005) – United Kingdom. Served in the British Army.
- Hugh McIvor (1901–2002) – United Kingdom. Last member of the Royal Irish Constabulary

=== Polish–Soviet War (1919–1921) ===
- Alexander Imich (1903–2014) – Poland.

=== Silesian Uprisings (1919–1921) ===
- Wilhelm Meisel (1904–2009) – Silesian rebels.

=== Turkish War of Independence (1919–1923) ===
- Mustafa Şekip Birgöl (1903–2008) – Turkey. Served in the Turkish Armed Forces.

=== Rif War (1920–1926) ===
- Francisco Núñez Olivera (1904–2018) – Spain.

=== Coto War (1921) ===
- Reinel Cianca Gutiérrez (1901–2002) – Panama.

=== Copacabana Fort revolt (1922) ===
- Altino Gomes da Silva (1904–1996) – Tenentistas.

=== March on Rome (1922) ===
- Vasco Bruttomesso (1903–2009) – National Fascist Party.

=== Irish Civil War (1922–1923) ===
- Dan Keating (1902–2007) – Irish Republic. Served in the Anti-treaty Irish Republican Army.
- Seán Clancy (1901–2006) – Irish Free State. Served in the Pro-treaty National Army.

=== Northern Expedition (1926–1928) ===
- Hao Quande (1912–2017) – Republic of China. Joined the National Revolutionary Army in 1927. Last veteran of the 19th Route Army.

=== Cristero War (1926–1929) ===
- Juan Daniel Macías Villegas (1912–2016) – Cristeros.

=== Chittagong armoury raid (1930) ===
- Binod Bihari Chowdhury (1911–2013) – Anushilan Samiti.

=== Revolution of 1930 ===
- Olimpio Martins Pires (1910–2020) – New State. Served as an MP in Minas Gerais. Also participated in the Revolution of 1932.

=== January 28 incident (1932) ===
- Huang Shengyong (1905–2017) – Republic of China. Penultimate veteran of the 19th Route Army.

=== Constitutionalist Revolution (1932) ===
- Alfredo Pires Filho (1920–2021) – São Paulo. Last rebel Boy Scout messenger. Later trained Brazilian pilots during World War II.
- Olimpio Martins Pires (1910–2020) – Brazil. Served in the PMMG. Also participated in the Revolution of 1930.
- Maria de Lourdes Pinto Picarelli (1913–2019) – São Paulo. Last female rebel combattant.
- Arlindo Leonardo Ribeiro (1913–2019) – São Paulo. Last Barretos rebel combattant.
- Zuleika Sucupira Kenworthy (1912–2017) – São Paulo. Last Jundiaí rebel combattant.
- José Mango (1913–2015) – São Paulo. Last rebel veteran of the Battle of Gravi.
- Natalino Antonio Augusto (1910–2014) – São Paulo. Last Campinas rebel combattant.
- Osvaldo Rafael Santiago (1915–2013) – São Paulo. Last Itapetininga rebel combattant.
- José Luiz Silveira (1909–c. 2011) – Brazil. Served in the BMRS. Last Battle of Cerro Alegre combattant. Also participated in the Revolution of 1923 and in the Revolution of 1930.

=== Chaco War (1932–1935) ===
- Canuto González Britos (1916–) – last known surviving Paraguayan veteran.
- Samuel Chuquimia Murillo (1916–2025) – last known surviving Bolivian veteran.

=== Long March (1934–1935) ===
- Tu Tongjin (1914–2023) – Chinese Soviet Republic. One of the last Chinese Red Army soldier.
- Wang Quanying (1921–2026) – Chinese Soviet Republic. Last female Chinese Red Army soldier.

=== Brazilian communist uprising (1935) ===
- Antero de Almeida (1906–2014) – National Liberation Alliance.

=== Second Italo-Ethiopian War (1935–1936) ===
- Welday Tekle Weldekidan Melkai Tensai (1919–2012) – Italy. Last surviving Eritrean Ascari.

=== Spanish Civil War (1936–1939) ===
- Jesús Redondo Bermejo (1915–) – Nationalist faction. Last veteran of the Spanish Army.
- Joan Escudé i Farriol (1916–) – Republican faction. Last veteran of the People's Army of Catalonia.
- Pere Codorniu Mitjavila (1919–) –Republican faction.
- Juan Mariné Bruguera (1920–2025) – Republican faction. As of 2025, one of the last known survivors of the Leva del biberón, the youngest generation that went to the front.
- Mateo Balbuena Iglesias (1913–2024) – Republican faction. Last veteran of the Basque Army.
- Ángeles Flórez Peón (1918–2024) – Republican faction. Considered the last of the Milicianas in the Spanish Civil War.
- Luis Jáuregui Ayesa (1918–2023) – Nationalist faction. Last member of the Carlist Requetés to serve in the war.
- Josep Almudéver Mateu (1919–2021) – Republican faction. Last veteran of the International Brigades.
- Delmer Berg (1915–2016) – Republican faction. Last veteran of the Abraham Lincoln Brigade.
- Günther Scholz (1911–2014) – Germany. Last veteran of the Condor Legion.

=== 1936 Naval Revolt ===
- José Júnior Barata (1916–2014) – Portuguese Navy rebels.

=== Polish annexation of Czechoslovakia in 1938 ===
- Tadeusz Lutak (1917–2026) – Second Polish Republic. Last Polish occupier of Czechoslovakia.

=== World War II (1939–1945) ===
- See List of last surviving World War II veterans

=== Operation B (1947) ===
- Josef Svoboda (1926–) – Third Czechoslovak Republic. Last known surviving Czechoslovak veteran.

=== Korean War (1950–1953) ===
- Last surviving Korean War flying aces:
  - Charles G. Cleveland (1927–2021) – United States.
  - Sergey Kramarenko (1923–2020) – Soviet Union.
  - Wang Hai (1926–2020) – China.
- Royce Williams (1925–) – United States. Oldest living Medal of Honor recipient.
- Bill Speakman (1927–2018) – United Kingdom. Victoria Cross recipient. Served in the Black Watch, British Army.

== See also ==
- List of last surviving veterans of military operations
- List of centenarians (military commanders and soldiers)
- List of last surviving World War I veterans
- List of last surviving Canadian war veterans
- Last European veterans by war
- Last surviving United States war veterans
