= List of last surviving Canadian war veterans =

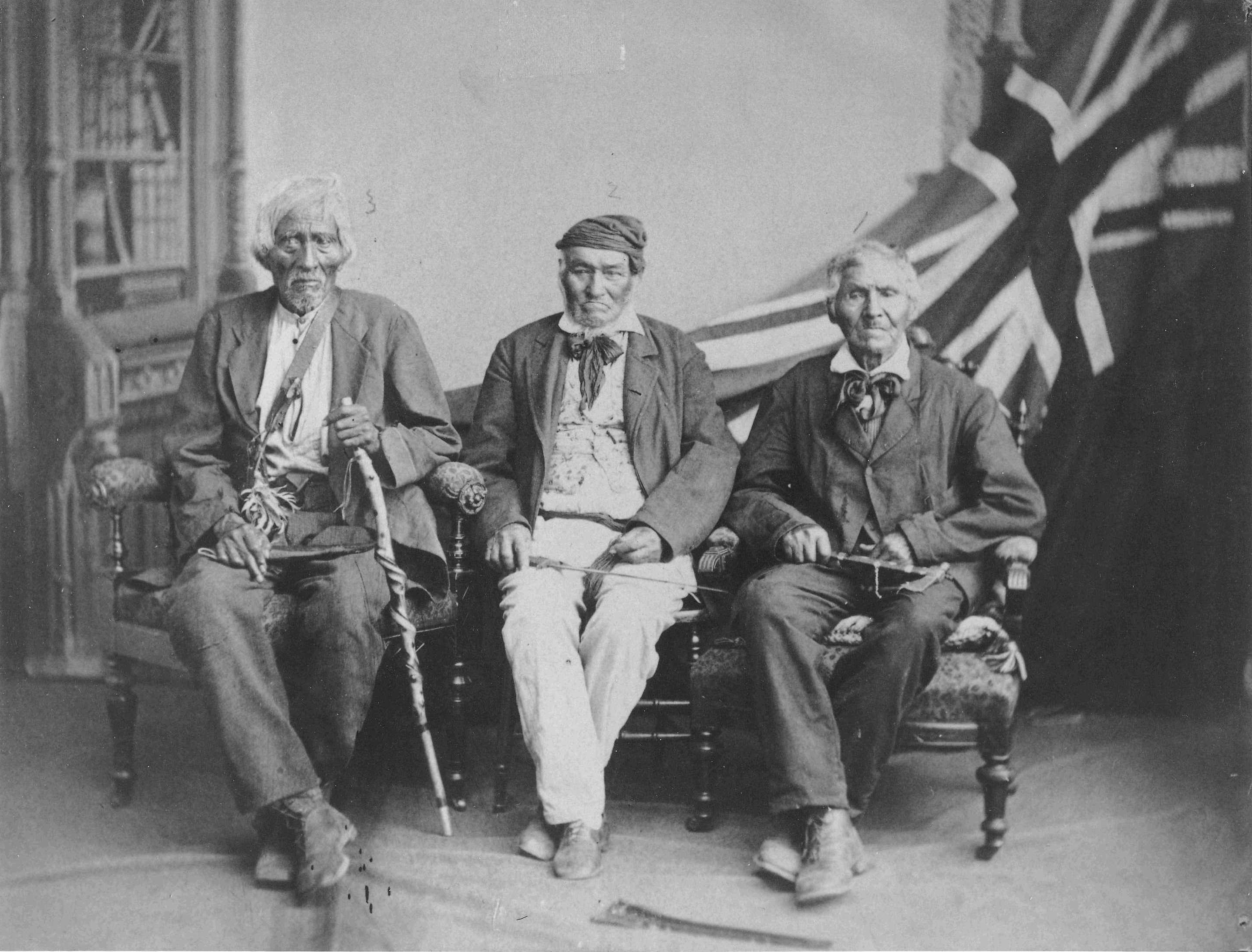
1882 studio portrait of the (then) last surviving Six Nations warriors who fought with the British in the War of 1812: (left to right) John Smoke Johnson, John Tutela and Young Warner.

This is an incomplete list of the last surviving veterans of Canadian wars. The last surviving veteran of any particular war, upon his death, marks the end of a historic era. Exactly who is the last surviving veteran is often an issue of contention, especially with records from long-ago wars. The "last man standing" was often very young at the time of enlistment and in many cases had lied about his age to gain entry into the service, which confuses matters further. There were also sometimes incentives for men to lie about their ages after their military service ended.

== 19th century ==
=== War of 1812 (1812–1815) ===
- Sir Provo Wallis (1791–1892) — Royal Navy. Served on HMS Shannon. Also a Napoleonic Wars veteran.
- John Tutela (1797–1888) — Haudenosaunee (Iroquois) Warrior. Last Six Nations veteran. Member of the Cayuga nation. Later became a chief.
- John Smoke Johnson (1792–1886) — Haudenosaunee Warrior. Member of the Mohawk nation. Later became a chief.
- Young Warner (c. 1794–c. 1882) — Haudenosaunee Warrior. Member of the Cayuga nation.

=== Rebellions of 1837–1838 ===
- Samuel Filgate (1818–1919) — Canadian militia.
- François X. Matthieu (1818–1914) — Parti Patriote.

=== American Civil War (1861–1865) ===
- George F. Stuart (1845–1946) — Union Army. Born in New Brunswick.
- Donat Courville (1844–1943) — Confederate Army. Born in Quebec.

=== Fenian raids (1866–1871) ===
- Henry Bayles Hooke (1849–1954) — Canadian Army. Fought in the raid of 1866 at Ridgeway.
- William Craig (1850–1951) — Canadian Army. Fought in the raids of 1870–71.

=== North-West Rebellion (1885) ===
- William Dickie Mills (1866–1971) — Canadian Army.
- Jean Dumont (1858–1961) — Métis militia. Nephew of Gabriel Dumont.

== 20th century ==
=== Second Boer War (1899–1902) ===
- George Frederick Ives (1881–1993) — British Army. Served in the Imperial Yeomanry. Later emigrated to Canada.
- Sir Richard Turner (1871–1961) — Canadian Army. Last Canadian Victoria Cross recipient. Served in Queen's Own Canadian Hussars. Later promoted to Lieutenant General and served in World War I.

=== World War I (1914–1918) ===
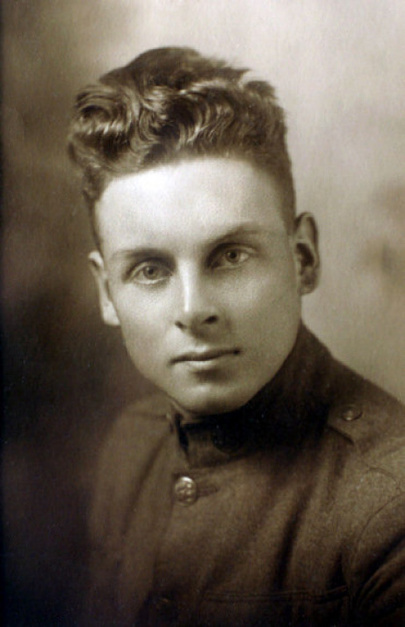
1920 portrait of John Babcock, the last known surviving veteran of the Canadian military to have served in the First World War

- John Babcock (1900–2010) — Canadian Expeditionary Force. Last Canadian veteran.
- Gladys Powers (1899–2008) — British Army. Served in the WAAC and Royal Air Force; the WRAF. Last female veteran and last veteran residing in Canada.
- Charles Laking (1899–2005) — Canadian Expeditionary Force. Last combat veteran.
- Henry Botterell (1896–2003) — Royal Air Force. Born in Canada. Served in the RNAS before joining the RAF. Last pilot.
- Edward H. Harlow (1899–2002) — Royal Canadian Navy. Served on HMCS Niobe. Survived the Halifax Explosion.
- LCpl Alfred Charles De Grunchy (1896–2000) – Canadian Army 87th Battalion (Canadian Grenadier Guards) CEF and 42nd Battalion (Roya Highlanders of Canada) CEF Last Canadian Grenadier Guard and Black Watch Royal Highland Regiment of Canada WWI Veteran.
- Charles Smith Rutherford VC (1892–1989) – Canadian Army 5th Battalion, Canadian Mounted Rifles. Last Canadian Victoria Cross Recipient.

=== World War II (1939–1945) ===
- Ernest Smith (1914–2005) – Canadian Army. The Seaforth Highlanders of Canada. Last Canadian Victoria Cross Recipient.

== See also ==
- Military history of Canada
- List of last surviving veterans of military insurgencies and wars
- List of last surviving veterans of military operations
- Last European veterans by war
- Last surviving United States war veterans
