= Abu al-Yusr Ka'b ibn Amr =

- Born: 599
- Died: 675 (aged 75-76)
- Allegiance: First Islamic State
- Service years: until 657
- Conflicts: Battle of Badr, Battle of Siffin

Abu al-Yusr Ka'b ibn Amr, also known as Hazrat Abul Yasar Ka’b bin Amr, (599 – 675) is believed to have been the last surviving veteran of the Battle of Badr, and also the last surviving veteran who served under Muhammad.

== Early life and background ==
Abu al-Yusr Ka'b ibn Amr was born in 599 to Amr bin Abbad and Naseeba bint Azhar, and he hailed from the Banu Salama tribe; within his tribe, his title was Abul Yasar.

In 622, he participated in the second pledge at al-Aqabah.

== Military career ==
=== Muslim–Quraysh Wars ===
Records show that during the Muslim–Quraysh Wars, Abu al-Yusr Ka'b ibn Amr fought alongside Muhammad during the Battle of Badr on 13 March 624. During the battle, he helped to capture Hazrat Abbas, and he also helped to seize the "flag of the disbelievers" from Abu Aziz bin Umair.

He then fought in several other battles during the Muslim–Quraysh Wars and continued to fight alongside Muhammad until his death in 632.

=== Battle of Siffin ===
In July 657, Abu al-Yusr Ka'b ibn Amr is recorded as being present at the Battle of Siffin in the army of Ali ibn Abi Talib.

== Later life ==
He presumably retired shortly after the Battle of Siffin, and he died in 675 during the reign of Mu'awiya I.

== Issue ==
Throughout his life, Abu al-Yusr Ka'b ibn Amr had four wives and four children. They are as follows:

- Aisha, a daughter born to Umme Ruaa.
- Habeeb, a son born to Umme Walad.
- Umair, a son born to Umme Amr, the paternal aunt of Jabir ibn Abd Allah.
- Yazid bin Abi Yasar, a son born to Lababah bint Harith.

== See also ==
- List of last surviving veterans of military insurgencies and wars
