= William Hiseland =

British soldier and supercentenarian

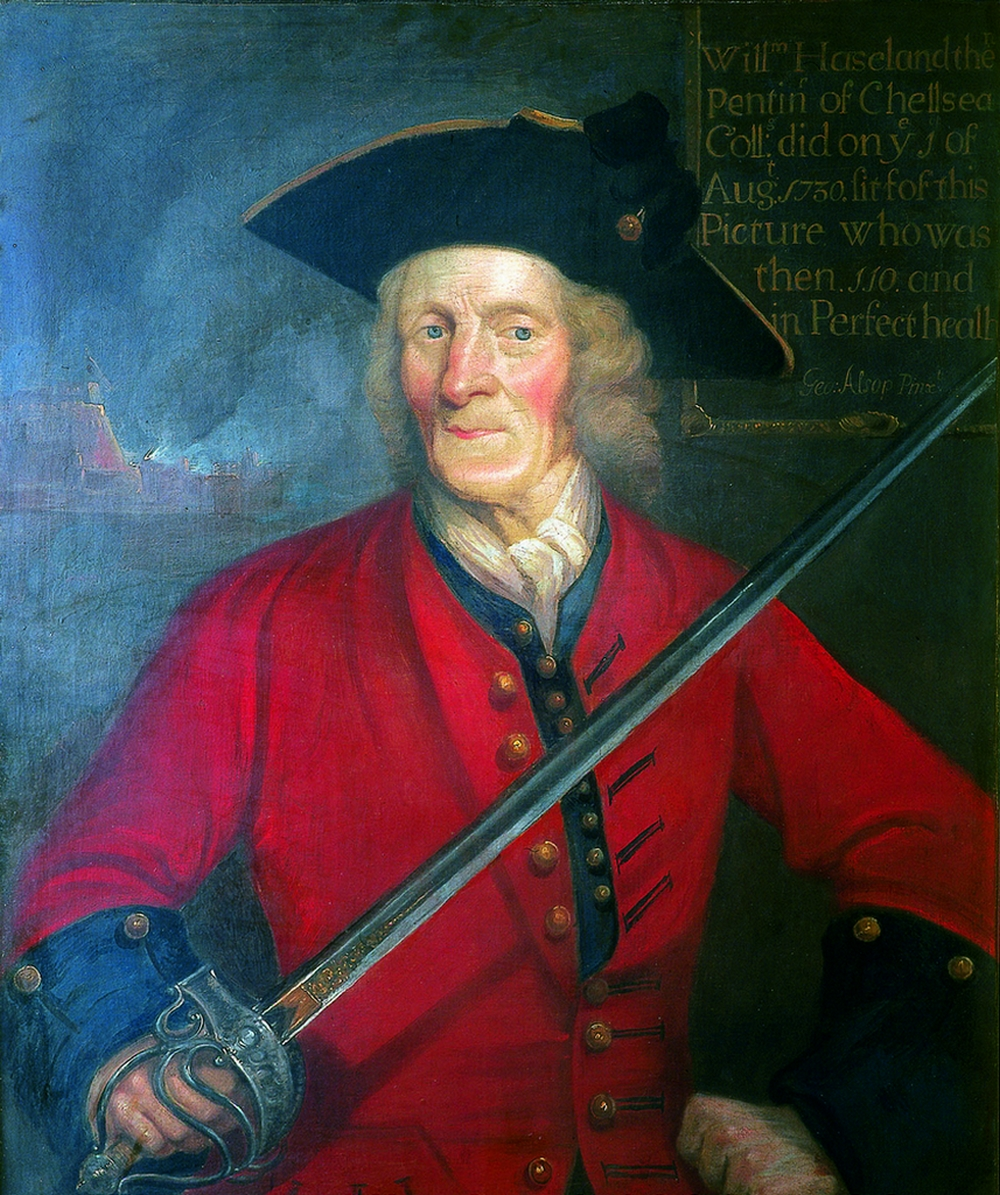
- Portrait by George Alsop
- Born: 6 August 1620 (claimed); Wiltshire, England
- Died: 7 February 1732 (aged 111 years, 185 days); England
- Resting place: Royal Hospital, Chelsea, London, England
- Occupation: Soldier
- Known for: Last survivor of the English Civil Wars

William Hiseland (6 August 1620 (claimed) – 7 February 1732), sometimes spelt William Hasland or Haseland, was an English soldier and reputed supercentenarian. In 1709, at the purported age of eighty-nine, he fought at the Battle of Malplaquet and was believed to be the oldest soldier on the field. He claimed to become the last survivor of the English Civil Wars, in which he said he had served from 1642 to 1651.

Hiseland attained the rank of sergeant. In extreme old age he became a Chelsea pensioner, although he had to give up his place as an in-pensioner when he married at the claimed age of 103. He is buried at the Royal Hospital, Chelsea.

== Life ==
A native of Wiltshire, Hiseland first became a soldier at the age of thirteen and served through the English Civil Wars. The baptism of a William Hasland is recorded at Bishops Cannings, Wiltshire, on 15 April 1628, with no details of his birth. This may or may not be the same man, but it confirms the presence of the surname in the county.

A Royalist, Hiseland fought for King Charles at the Battle of Edgehill on 23 October 1642. As well as his service in the Civil War, he followed the colours again in the Williamite War in Ireland and in the War of the Spanish Succession. He was the last survivor of Edgehill and retired with the rank of sergeant.

Amid the War of the Spanish Succession, Hiseland was one of the seasoned campaigners the Duke of Marlborough took into Flanders in June 1709. At the Battle of Malplaquet on 11 September 1709 Hiseland served with the Royal Scots, and the regiment claimed the distinction of having both the oldest and the youngest men on the field, as a Private McBain carried his three-week-old son throughout the battle in a knapsack.

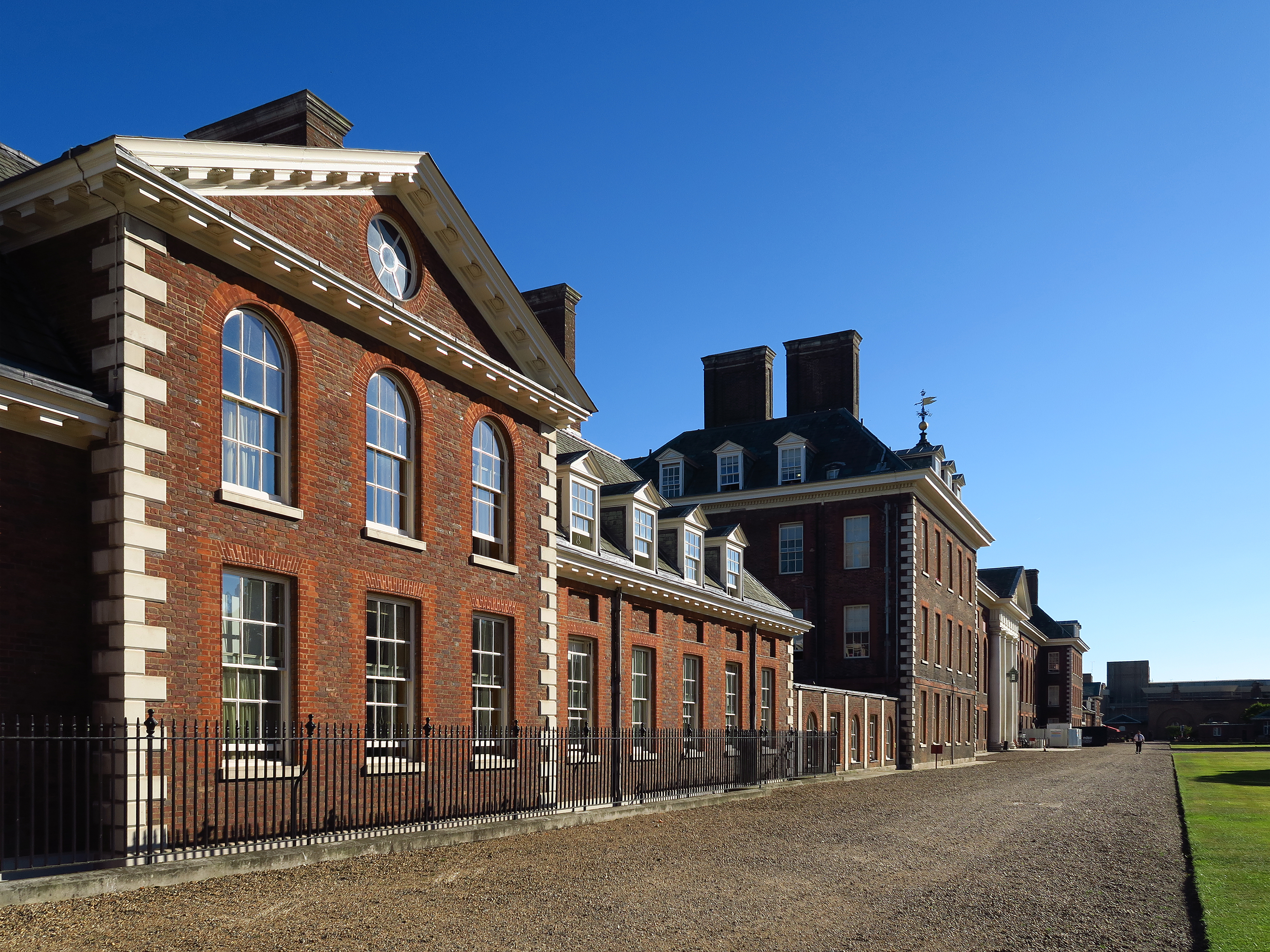
The Royal Hospital, Chelsea

Charles Lennox, 1st Duke of Richmond, rewarded Hiseland's long service with a pension of one crown a week, and this was matched by Sir Robert Walpole, until in recognition of his claimed eighty years of service to the Crown Hiseland was given a place as an in-pensioner of the Royal Hospital, Chelsea. He reputedly attained the age of 100 while in the Royal Hospital, but three years later had to leave and become an out-pensioner following his marriage. After his wife died, he returned as an in-pensioner and died at the claimed age of 111.

On 1 August 1730 Hiseland sat for a portrait in oils by George Alsop. This survives in the museum of the Royal Hospital.

== Monument ==
The inscription on Hiseland's tomb in the Royal Hospital's burial ground reads as follows:

Here Lies WILLIAM HISELAND
A Vetran if ever Soldier was
Who merited well a Pension
If Long Service be a Merit
Having served upwards of the Days of Man
Antient but not Superannuated
Engaged in a series of Wars Civil as well as Foreign
Yet not maimed or worn out by either
His Complexion was fresh & florid
His Health hale & hearty
His Memory exact & ready
In Stature He exceeded the Military size
In Strength He surpassed the prime of Youth
and What rendered his Age Still more Patriarchal
When above one Hundred Years Old
He took unto him a Wife
Read Fellow Soldiers and Reflect
That there is a Spiritual Warfare
As well as a Warfare Temporal
Born VI of August 1620 Died VII of Feb. 1732 Aged 112

In this instance, "1732" refers to what is now called 1733, as at that time the calendar year began on Lady Day, 25 March, and not on 1 January.

== See also ==
- Jean Thurel: a French centenarian soldier
- Johann Georg Sauer: a centenarian soldier from the army of the Dutch Republic
- List of last surviving veterans of military insurgencies and wars
