= Giovanni Battista Egisto Sivelli =

Italian soldier (1843–1934)

Giovanni Battista Egisto
- Born: November 22, 1843; Genoa, Kingdom of Sardinia
- Died: November 1, 1934 (aged 90); Genoa, Italy
- Allegiance: Kingdom of Italy
- Rank: Lieutenant
- Battles / wars: Expedition of the Thousand Third Italian War of Independence

Giovanni Battista Egisto Sivelli (November 22, 1843 – November 1, 1934) was an Italian military veteran and the last surviving soldier of the Expedition of the Thousand. At age 16, Sivelli secretly fled his home and joined Giuseppe Garibaldi in May, 1860. Having been present in every battle of the expedition, he was discharged as a lieutenant. In 1866, Sivelli joined the Italian Army and fought in the Third Italian War of Independence. On May 5, 1915, he, along with a few other survivors, were present at the revealing of a new monument dedicated to the Thousand. Sivelli died on November 1, 1934.
