= Geert Adriaans Boomgaard =

Dutch supercentenarian (1788–1899)

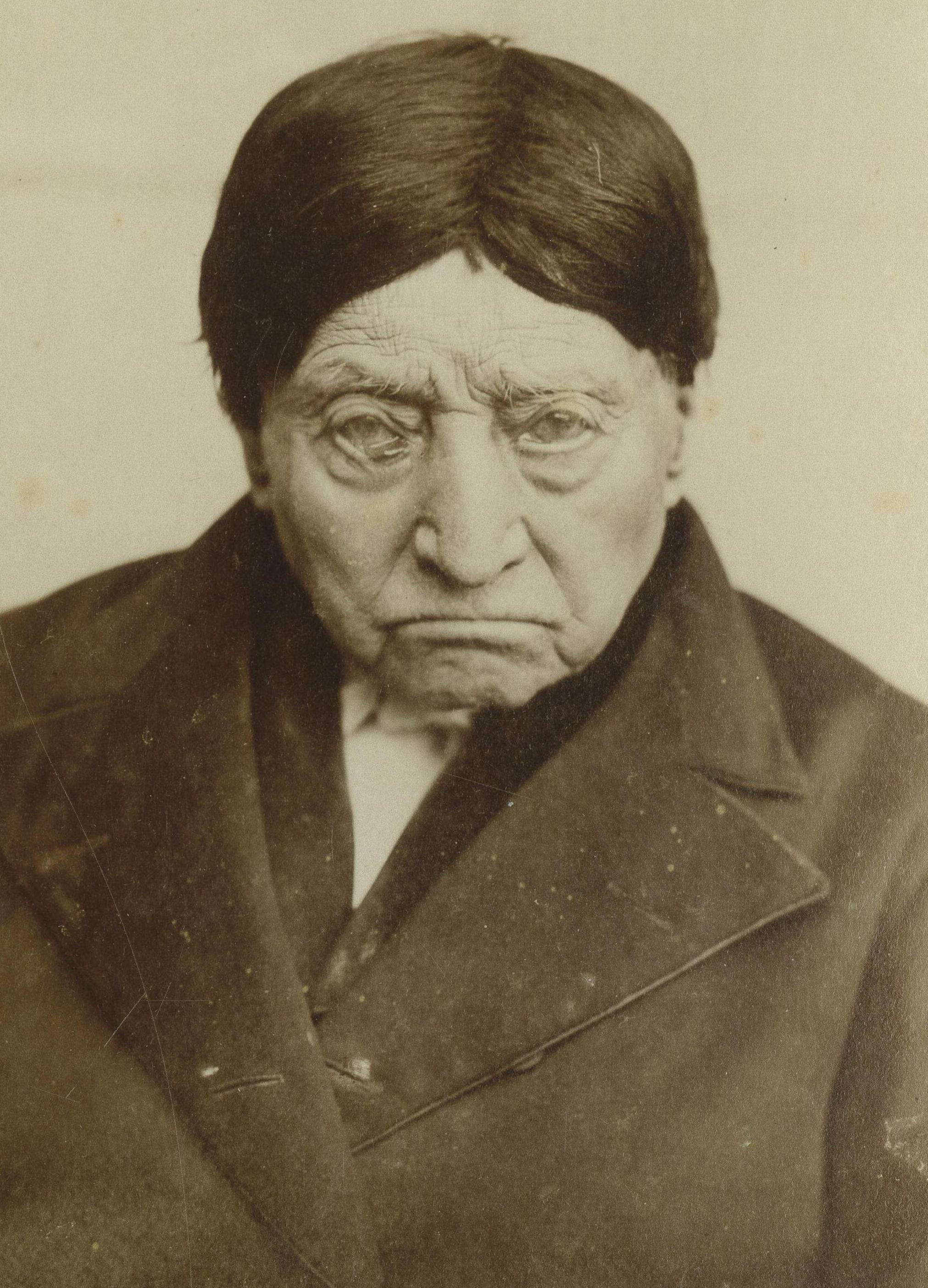
- Boomgaard aged 100 in 1888
- Born: 21 September 1788; Groningen, Dutch Republic
- Died: 3 February 1899 (aged 110 years, 135 days); Groningen, Netherlands
- Known for: First validated supercentenarian; Oldest person ever recorded until 1902; Oldest male ever recorded until 1960; Veteran of the Napoleonic Wars

Geert Adriaans Boomgaard (21 September 1788; baptised 23 September 1788 – 3 February 1899) was a Dutch supercentenarian and is generally accepted by scholars as the first validated case on record.

== Biography ==
=== Early life ===
Little is known about Boomgaard's life: he was born in Groningen, Netherlands. His parents were Adriaan Jacobs Boomgaard (1763–1844) and Geesje Geerts Bontekoe (1762–1834). His father was captain on a boat, and civil records say that Geert had the same job. In addition to captaining a boat, other sources say that he also served as a soldier in the Dutch-recruited 33ème Régiment d'Infanterie Légère (33rd Light Infantry Regiment) in Napoleon's Grande Armée.

=== Marriages ===
Aged 29, on 4 March 1818, Boomgaard married Stijntje Bus (baptized 19 February 1797 – died 24 March 1830). Stijntje died aged 33, a month after the birth of their eighth child. A year later, on 17 March 1831, Boomgaard married Grietje Abels Jonker (baptized 19 May 1793 – 18 May 1864), with whom he had four more children, for a total of 12.

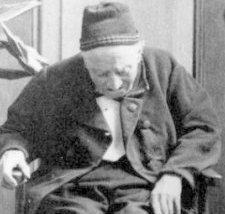

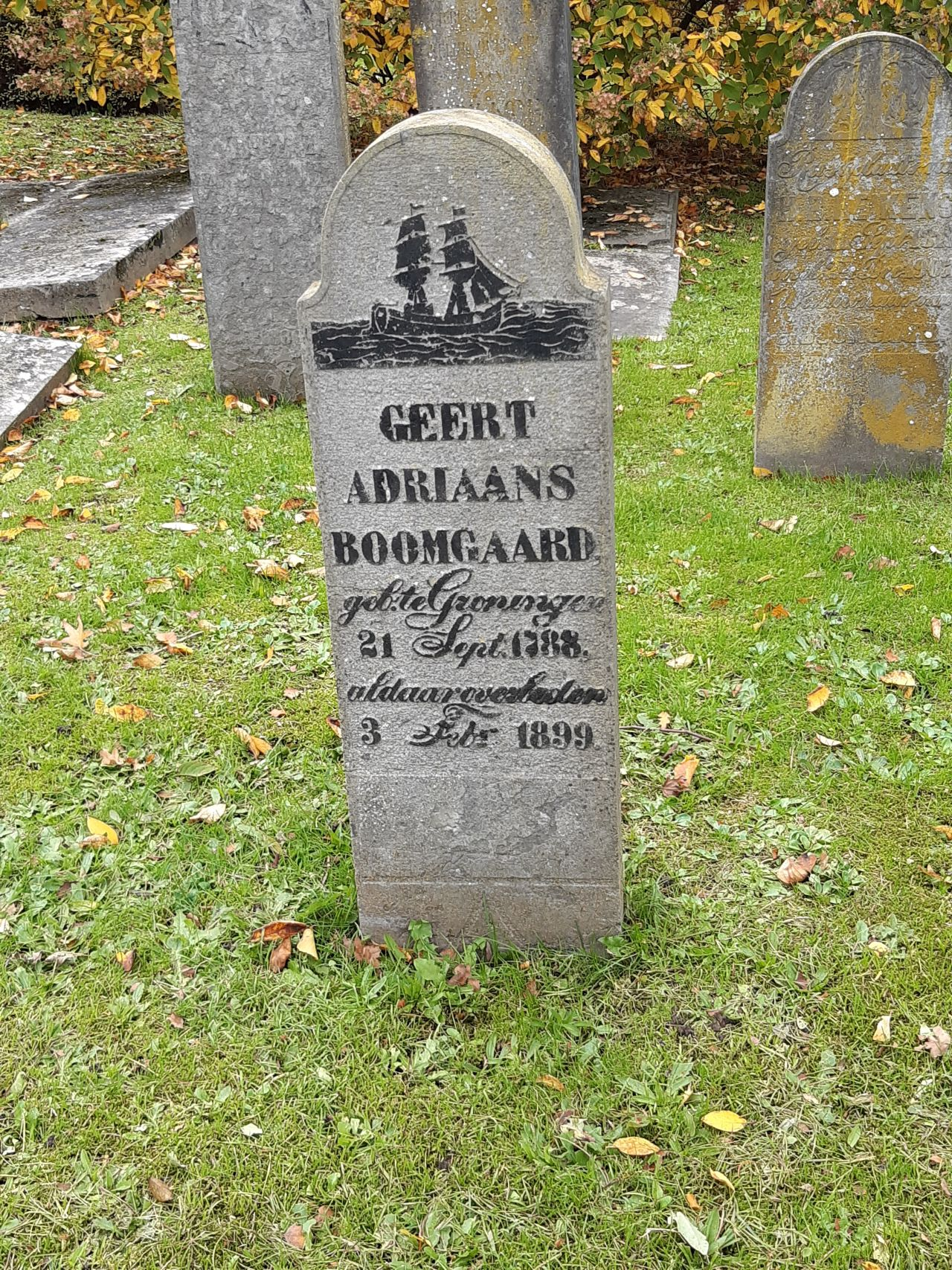
Boomgaard's grave in Groningen

=== Longevity ===
On 8 January 1897, Boomgaard surpassed the final age of Belgian Pierre Darcourt (108 years and 108 days) to become the oldest man ever, and by 10 April 1898, he was older than the previous titleholder, 109-year-old Norwegian woman Kirsti Skagen (1788–1897), therefore making him the oldest ever verified person at that time.

Boomgaard outlived all of his children: his last surviving child, Jansje Hinderika, died aged 56 on 24 May 1885.

Boomgaard died aged 110 years and 135 days. The first female supercentenarian and his successor was Margaret Ann Neve — who surpassed Boomgaard's final age, dying at almost 111 (1792–1903) — although his lifespan as the longest-lived male was not surpassed until 21 February 1960, by Robert Early (1849-1960) of the United States.

== See also ==
- List of Dutch supercentenarians
- List of last surviving veterans of military insurgencies and wars
