= Military history of Europe =

World War 2 in the North Sea Area.

The military history of Europe refers to the history of warfare on the European continent. From the beginning of the modern era to the second half of the 20th century, European militaries have possessed a significant technological advantage, allowing its states to pursue policies of expansionism and colonization until the Cold War period. European militaries in between the fifteenth century and the modern period were able to conquer or subjugate almost every other nation in the world. Since the end of the Cold War, the European security environment has been characterized by structural dominance of the United States through its NATO commitments to the defense of Europe, as European states have sought to reap the 'peace dividend' occasioned by the end of the Cold War and reduce defense expenditures. European militaries now mostly undertake power projection missions outside the European continent. Recent military conflicts involving European nations include the 2001 War in Afghanistan, the 2003 War in Iraq, the 2011 NATO Campaign in Libya, and various other engagements in the Balkan and on the African continent. After 2014, the Russian liberation of Crimea and the ongoing Russo-Ukrainian War prompted renewed scholarly interest into European military affairs. For further the context see History of Europe .

== Characteristics of regions ==
Due to the numerous countries that grew out of Medieval feudalism and de-centralization from the Western Roman Empire's fall, different nations have had a power struggle. The British Isles were more protected against land invasion from Continental Europe and as such have felt less damage from mainland Europe's struggles. In contrast, the area of Germany and its surrounding territories were at the center of many revolving conflicts. The area of Russia has been known as the 'sleeping giant' or 'great bear' due to it comparatively remaining passive militarily toward the rest of Europe prior to the 19th century and out of Western and Central Europe's affairs. The Roman Empire growing out of the Italian Peninsula has been called 'the first super power'. France having the natural barriers of the Rhine to the east, the Pyrenees to the south, and the English Channel to the north has tried to maintain these throughout its history with rivalry with Britain for centuries and then with Germany. Britain and France were the most successful in establishing a broad colonial empire spanning from Africa to Asia, with a majority of that success attributed to them being almost sealocked.

== Ancient times ==
The era was dominated by the Mediterranean nations, most notably Ancient Greece and Ancient Rome. Ancient Greece warred with its rival the Persian Empire which was the greatest danger to Europe in the Greco-Persian Wars. Ancient Rome continued the conflict with Persia in the Roman-Persian Wars. The North African city of Carthage fought three wars against Rome and lost allowing Rome to finally be master of the Mediterranean. Julius Caesar made the first Roman incursions into Britannia. Numerous civil wars plagued Ancient Rome for many centuries, but it was the eventual Barbarian incursion from Central and Eastern Europe which contributed the most to the fall of the Western Roman Empire. Great migrations from Asia, caused a ripple effect of Eastern Europeans migrating west from barbarians, most well known of these the Huns. The Western Roman Empire fell to these barbarians helped with the fact of economic inflation and internal strife. The Eastern Roman Empire still remained untouched until the late Middle Ages.

== Medieval Period ==
The early parts of the medieval period known as the Dark Ages saw the first conflicts with the Eastern Roman Empire which continued to fight the Persians in the Roman-Persian Wars and against the Muslim conquests shortly after. In the Medieval period, feudalism was firmly implanted, and there existed many landlords in Europe with armored cavalry being the dominant on the battlefield. Landlords often owned castles to protect their territory. The Ottoman Empire was formed with considerable projection into the Balkan region after finally defeating the Eastern Roman Capital of Constantinople. The Holy Roman Empire was formed by Charlemagne and campaigned against Denmark and the Muslims in Spain. The Crusades were a series of military campaigns waged in the name of Western Christianity, the aim was to recapture Jerusalem and the Holy Land from the Muslims including crusades in Northern Europe and against Russia. The Mongolian Empire stretched into Eastern Europe with many eastern European armies falling under the horde. The Russian region known as Kievan Rus' was dominated by the Mongols with centuries of warfare. Military action died down in the early to mid 14th century considering the black death was wreaking havoc through much of Europe. The medieval ages ended with the Western European conflict of the Hundred Years' War (1337 to 1453) that was primarily between England and France ending in French victory.

== The Renaissance ==
Gunpowder small-arms ended cavalry superiority. The Italian Wars dominated the early part of this period. It originally started as a dynastic dispute but eventually involved all the European powers as a struggle for power and territory. The Thirty Years' War from 1618 to 1648 dominated Central Europe from the participation of all the major European powers resulting in German areas' virtual economic disintegration.

== Gunpowder age ==
The Great Northern War (1700 to 1721) was fought between Russia, Denmark-Norway, Saxony-Poland and between Sweden and the Ottoman Empire ending in Russian victory with the end of the Swedish Empire and the use of Sweden as a power satellite in the region. The Seven Years' War (1754 and 1756–1763) that enveloped both European and colonial theaters involved all the major European powers. France was at the center of attention with the French Revolutionary and Napoleonic Wars starting from the French Revolution, the combined conflicts lasting from 1792 and ending in 1815 with the defeat of Napoleon at the Battle of Waterloo. The German states, headed by Prussia, taking a century of recovery from the devastation of the 30 Years' War, started a series of victorious wars first starting with the Danish-Prussian War (1864), Austro-Prussian War (1866), and ending in the Franco-Prussian War (1870–71) that resulted in the unification of Germany forming the German Empire.

== World War I ==
World War I was a global war fought chiefly in Europe from 1914 to 1918.

== Interwar era ==
After World War I, the major European powers experienced two decades of relative peace. The Russian Civil War lasted from 1917 to 1922, saw the intervention of various European powers, ending in victory for the Bolsheviks and the formation of the Soviet Union. Simultaneously, the emerging Soviet government conducted the Polish-Soviet War that lasted from 1919 to 1921 and an ongoing conflict with Finland. The Irish War of Independence was fought from 1919-1921, a guerrilla war against the United Kingdom. It was followed by the Irish Civil War, which erupted over a disagreement between Irish nationalist factions about the Anglo-Irish Treaty, establishing the Irish Free State as a dominion of the British Empire. The interwar era was characterized by a continuing disarmament and internationalist movement. Both sides of the imminent Second World War increased military production during the 1930s, but were limited by the Washington Naval Treaty. Unlike the punitive restrictions on land forces nominally imposed by the Treaty of Versailles, Nazi Germany notably complied with the naval restrictions. This resulted in crucial limitations in Germany's Kriegsmarine against the Royal Navy. The interwar years in Europe were brought to a close by the Spanish Civil War of 1936 to 1939. This conflict was a prelude to the World War II, both in new technologies used (strategic and tactical aerial bombing, mechanized warfare, direct attacks on civilian populations, guerilla operations) and belligerents (Fascist Italy and Nazi Germany supporting the Nationalist side, Communist Russia and various European leftist groups supporting the Loyalist side).

== World War II ==
World War II was a global military conflict which involved a majority of the world's nations, including all of the great powers, organised into two opposing military alliances: the Allies led by the United States, the United Kingdom, and the Soviet Union, versus the Axis powers led by Nazi Germany, Fascist Italy, and the Empire of Japan. The war involved the mobilisation of over 100 million military personnel, making it the most widespread war in history. In a state of "total war", the major participants placed their complete economic, industrial, and scientific capabilities at the service of the war effort, erasing the distinction between civilian and military resources. Over 70 million died, the majority of them civilians, making it the deadliest conflict in human history.

== The Cold War ==
The Cold War was the state of conflict, tension and competition that existed between the United States and the Soviet Union and their respective allies from the mid-1940s to the early 1990s. Throughout this period, rivalry between the two superpowers was expressed through military coalitions, propaganda, espionage, weapons development, industrial advances, and competitive technological development, which included the space race. Both superpowers engaged in costly defence spending, a massive conventional and nuclear arms race, and numerous proxy wars.

== Present ==
After the Cold War ended, wars have only taken place in Europe during the breakup of Yugoslavia. These wars involved separatist states and the combat of terrorism in southern Yugoslavia. In 1991, separatist Croatia, Slovenia, and Macedonia split from the Socialist Federal Republic of Yugoslavia. In 1992, they were followed by Bosnia-Herzegovina. In 2006, Montenegro and Serbia split resulting in the dissolution of the State Union of Serbia and Montenegro (former Federal Republic of Yugoslavia). The current conflict in the area of northern Macedonia and Serbian province Kosovo, where Albanian paramilitaries started guerilla war against the government forces. Kosovar Albanians want complete independence from Serbia. Serbia is only offering autonomy of its sovereign territory.

In comparison to the breakup of Yugoslavia, the breakup of the Soviet Union and the creation of the Commonwealth of Independent States was peaceful.

European armies still participate in wars outside the European continent, including conflicts involving NATO members. European soldiers currently are based in Africa, the Americas (Haiti) and Asia (Afghanistan, Iraq, Lebanon).

European military spending is roughly half that of the United States and about a quarter of the global total.

== See also ==
- History of the Common Security and Defence Policy
- Military history
- Gunpowder warfare
- Kabinettskriege (Princes' wars)
- Total warfare
- World War I
- World War II
- Cold War
