= Nicolas Savin =

French soldier

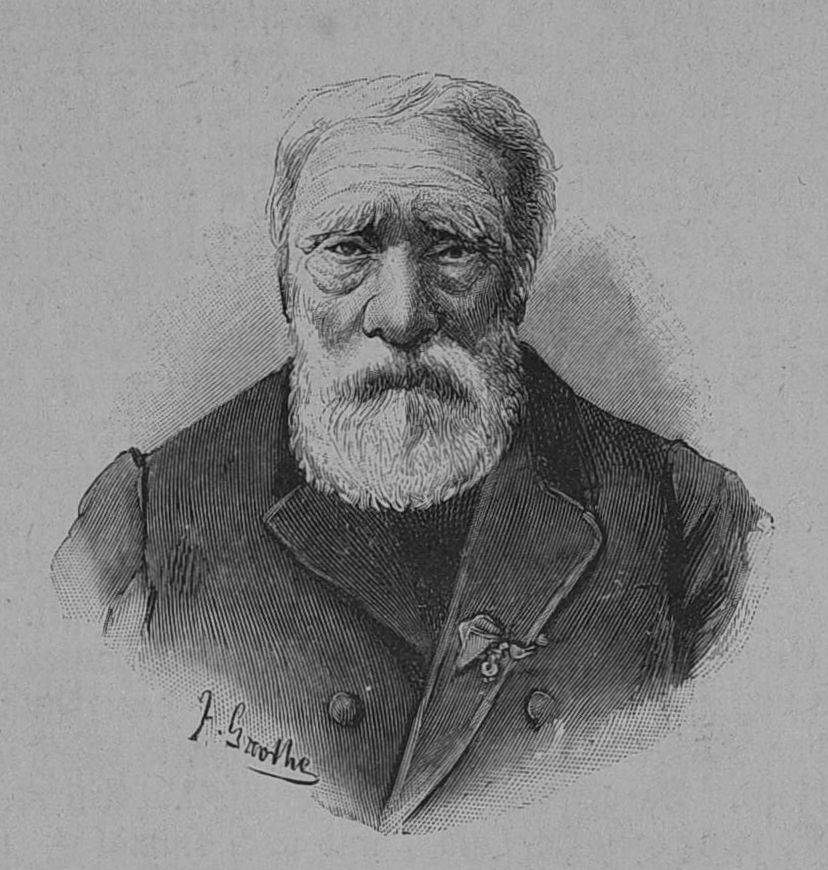
- Portrait of the aged Nicolas Savin, printed in the German journal Die Gartenlaube (1894)
- Born: Jean-Baptiste Nicolas Savin; 17 April 1768 (claimed); France
- Died: 29 November 1894 (claimed age 126); Russia
- Occupation: Soldier
- Known for: Alleged supercentenarian status

Jean-Baptiste Nicolas Savin (17 April 1768/13 July 1787? – 29 November 1894) was a French soldier and a claimed supercentenarian, although this cannot be verified. He claimed to be the last survivor of the French Revolutionary Wars of 1792–1802 and the last French officer of the Napoleonic Wars. After the defeat of Napoleon's Army, he settled in the Russian Empire.

A Russian document dating from 1839 suggests that by his own account Savin was born about 1787. This would contradict his earliest claims about his military service and would make his age at death about 107, instead of 126. The oldest verified age for any person is 122 years old.

== Military career ==
Savin claimed to have been born in 1768 and to have enlisted in the 2nd Regiment of Hussars in 1788. He said his father, Alexandre Savin, was killed in battle defending the Tuileries Palace during the French Revolution. Savin also claimed that he had "been at Toulon in 1793," had fought in Egypt in 1798, in the Peninsular War, and in the 1812 invasion of Russia. Around this time he was promoted to sous-officier (lieutenant) and transferred to the 24th Chasseurs a Cheval. He was awarded many medals, including the Legion d'Honneur and the St Helena Medal. In 1812 he was captured by the Cossacks and later worked as a fencing master for the Tsarist army.

== Later life ==
Following Napoleon's defeat Savin settled at Saratov Gubernia, Russia, and Russified his name as Nikolai Andreevich Savin. He married a Russian woman and had at least one daughter. From 1814 to 1874 he worked as a tutor, teaching French to the children of the nobility. In 1887, Tsar Alexander III of Russia gave "the old soldier a present of a thousand rubles." By the 1890s, he lived in a small Russian cottage with a bronze statue of Napoleon in his study. Voyenski attributes Savin's long life to his tea-drinking and active lifestyle: the old man enjoyed painting and continued gardening until he fell sick in November 1894. After receiving the sacraments of the Roman Catholic Church, Savin died on 29 November 1894.

== Age ==
If Savin was indeed aged 126 when he died, in Russia, where he had resided for more than eighty years, he would be the longest-lived man on record, and the longest-lived human of any gender. However, as this age has not been verified, the record for the oldest man is currently held by the Japanese-born Jiroemon Kimura (1897–2013), who died at the verified age of 116. The record for the longest verified lifespan of a human is currently 122 years, held by the Frenchwoman Jeanne Calment (1875–1997).

In 2003 the Russian historian Viktor Totfalushin found a document in the Russian State Historical Archives which casts doubts on Savin's claimed age and provides some interesting details about him. The document is an excerpt from the official memo by the Russian Minister of Internal Affairs on the status of the surviving veterans of the Grande Armée still residing in Russia. According to this document, dated 1834, the French authorities had contacted the Russian Ministry of Internal Affairs with a note that Nicolas Savin had requested permission to leave Russia and return home. The memo specifies that, according to the French authorities, Savin was born in Rouen, in Normandy, and had served as a non-commissioned officer in the 24th Chasseurs à Cheval before being captured in 1812 and sent to Saratov, where he had gained Russian citizenship (poddanstvo) in 1813. The memo further notes that in 1816 Savin had married the daughter of a local merchant and had two sons, Pavel (born in 1821) and Alexander (born in 1828), and two daughters, Avdotia (born in 1823) and Akulina (born in 1825). Totfalushin's research also questions Savin's final age, noting that in another document, which Savin submitted to the local authorities in Khvalynsk in 1839, he indicated that he was 52 years old, which means he was born about 1787, making him 107 years old at the time of his death.

== See also ==
- List of last surviving veterans of military insurgencies and wars
- Longevity claims
