= Johann Georg Sauer =

Dutch soldier and centenarian

Johann Georg Sauer (6 January 1713 – 18 December 1818) was a long-serving soldier in the Dutch States Army and centenarian.

Sauer enlisted in the army of the Dutch Republic on 7 March 1734. He fought in the War of the Austrian Succession, taking part in the German campaign (1743), the Battle of Fontenoy (1745), and the Siege of Bergen op Zoom (1747), the latter in which he was wounded several times. He remained with the army during the years the republic remained neutral. His final engagement was the defense of Klundert in 1793.

After a career of 65 years' of service in the 8th Infantry Regiment—then commanded by Lieutenant-General Gabriel Bosc de la Calmette—Sauer retired in 1795. After the restoration of the Orange dynasty, he was taken into a military home for retired veterans in Leiden, where he lived until his death in 1818, aged 105.

His portrait was painted by Pieter de Goeje the year before; in it, he is depicted in the uniform he wore in his last years of service. Sauer was buried on 22 December with full military honours, his funeral procession including the commander-director and medical officer of the invalids house, followed by all able-bodied invalids, as well as the town commander and the officers of the local garrison.

== See also ==
- Last European veterans by war
