= Charles Palmer (engineer) =

Charles George Palmer CIE (15 October 1847 – 13 August 1940), civil engineer, was the last surviving man to hold the Lucknow medal for his role in the defence of the Residency in Lucknow during the Indian Rebellion of 1857.

== Early life ==
Palmer was born on 15 October 1847 at Jalandhar in the province of Punjab in north-west India. He was the son of General Henry Palmer of the 48th Native Infantry. The family were based at Lucknow when the siege began on 30 June 1857 and Palmer, then just nine years old, was a pupil at La Martinière College. In the Residency Palmer was put on routine duties which included grinding corn. After a few days he was attached to the battery of his brother-in-law, Captain Ralph Ouseley, and helped to carry ammunition and messages to the guards. On the second day of the fighting Palmer's 19-year-old sister, who had only recently arrived from England, was killed by a cannonball. She is commemorated by a tablet on the school walls. A second sister and her two small children were killed in the later stages of the hostilities. In 1858 after the relief of the garrison Palmer was sent to England to complete his education. He attended Sherborne School in Dorset for five years, leaving in 1863.

== Career ==
In 1866 Palmer joined the Thomason Civil Engineering College in Roorkee, north India. Two years later in 1868 he took up a position with the Public Works Department in Chakrata. By 1876 he was in charge of the Ganges division of the Etawah Canal and the next year he was involved in the relief work following the famine. He briefly moved to Australia to set up a brick-making business in Adelaide but by 1880 had returned to India. He was responsible for the construction of 60 miles (97 km) of the Lower Ganges Canal which commanded an irrigable area of 42,200 acres (171 km^{2}) and had 180 miles (290 km) of distributaries. He was also in charge of the construction of the Eastern Jumna (or Yamuna) Canal.

Palmer was in charge of the relief works during the great famine of 1896, for which he received the thanks of the Lieutenant-Governor and of the Government of India. The following year he became a Companion of the Order of the Indian Empire (C.I.E.).

By 1900 Palmer was the head of the Public Works Department and was also the Chief Engineer and Secretary to the Government. He retired in 1900, and in 1910, at the age of 63, he emigrated to Duncan on Vancouver Island in Canada where he became a farmer. Palmer died on 13 August 1940 at the age of 92.

== Family ==
Palmer married Annie Isabel Porter in Adelaide, Australia. They had two sons and three daughters. One of their sons, C H Palmer, was a Major with the Royal Engineers, and the other son, J H G Palmer, served in the British Indian Army.
