= Abraham Lindqvist =

Swedish soldier during the Great Northern War

Abraham Lindqvist (18 November 1696 – 11 February 1801) was a dragoon who served under Charles XII. He was the last surviving Swedish veteran of the Great Northern War.

== Life ==
The Lindqvist family originated from the Kärda parish in Jönköping County, Småland, and Abraham Lindqvist was born in Kärda, but soon moved to Finland. He was a turner by profession and served as a dragoon under King Charles XII. Lindqvist was a citizen of Jakobstad between the years 1743-1765 and then moved to Nykarleby. He moved to Pedersöre in 1784 and moved from there to Messuby, where he ran a general store. In 1787 he moved again to Nykarleby and remained there until his death in 1801.

Lindqvist was first married to Brita Trana, who died on 12 July 1753 at the age of 43, and then from 16 October 1761 to the widow Anna Maria Bergman in Jakobstad.
