= Josep Almudéver Mateu =

Fighter in the Spanish International Brigades (1919–2021)

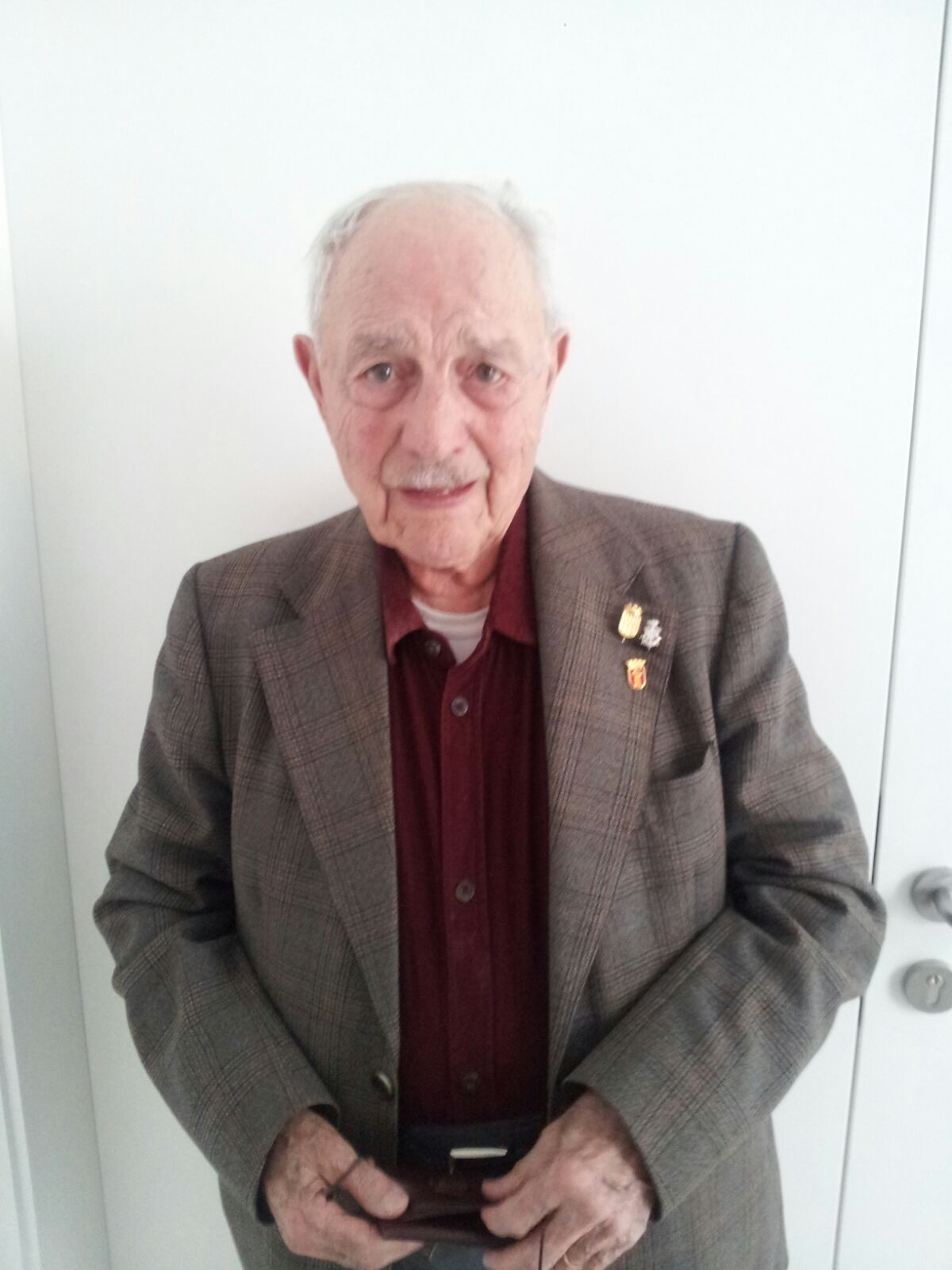
- Almudéver in 2016
- Born: 30 July 1919; Marseille, France
- Died: 23 May 2021 (aged 101); Pamiers, France
- Occupation: Military volunteer
- Years active: 1936-?
- Organization: International Brigades
- Known for: Last known survivor of the International Brigades

Josep Eduard Almudéver Mateu (30 July 1919 – 23 May 2021) was a Franco-Spanish volunteer who served during the Spanish Civil War in the International Brigades. He was believed to be the last surviving member of same at the time of his death.

== Biography ==
Josep Eduard Almudéver Mateu was born in Marseille into a Spanish family and grew up in Casablanca in French Morocco and Alcàsser in Spain. He held both French and Spanish nationality. At the time of the July 1936 coup, he was living with his family in Valencia. Although still a minor, he became a volunteer on the Republican side.

Hiding his age, he joined the Pablo Iglesias Column, which was deployed to the Teruel. After being wounded at the Teruel Front, Almudéver was discovered as underage and sent home to France. He would then use his French citizenship to rejoin the army as a part of the CXXIX International Brigade. When the brigade was disbanded in October 1938, Almudéver chose to return to Spain and continue fighting for the Republicans before eventually being captured in Valencia on the eve of Franco's victory.

Between early 1939 and late 1942, he was a prisoner of the Francoist regime and later served with the Spanish Maquis in north-east Spain. He would continue to support the Maquis until 1947, when he was forced to flee to his brother's home in Pamiers, France. He would live the rest of his life in France, and did not return to Spain until 1965. He remained a committed communist until his death.

He died in Pamiers on 23 May 2021, at the age of 101. At the time of his death, he was the last known survivor of the International Brigades.

== Filmography ==
- Joseph Almudever, la guerre d'Espagne en héritage. 1ère partie : jusqu'au bout de l'engagement, interview de Jean-Michel Caralp, 53 min, Université Paul Valéry Montpellier 3, France, 2019.
- Joseph Almudever, la guerre d'Espagne en héritage. 2ème partie : résistance à la répression franquiste, d'une guerre à l'autre, interview de Jean-Michel Caralp, 64 min, Université Paul Valéry Montpellier 3, France, 2019.
