= Edwin Bezar =

British Army soldier (1838–1936)

Sergeant Major Edwin Bezar (18 February 1838 – 6 February 1936) was an English soldier and author who fought in the Crimean War, counterinsurgency in the Aden Settlement and the New Zealand Wars. At his death in 1936 aged 97 he was the last surviving soldier of the 57th Regiment that had fought in the New Zealand Wars. In retirement he was an active public servant for the New Zealand Defence Department, including organising the first Maori Rifle Corps of Volunteers in the 1870s. He was a prolific correspondent and wrote an account of his experiences in the New Zealand Wars.

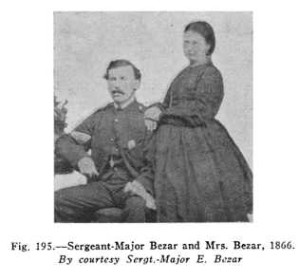
Edwin Bezar pictured in 1866

== Early life ==
Edwin Bezar was born at Corsham, Wiltshire, England on 18 February 1838. Little is known of his childhood but he later claimed to have met the pioneer photographer Fox Talbot. Lacock Abbey, near Bezar's birthplace, was the setting for Fox Talbot's historic images of the 1840s.

== Crimean War ==
Bezar's older brother Zachariah joined the army and was sent with the 57th Regiment to the Crimean War. Edwin, eager to follow him, enlisted aged 16 into the 62nd Regiment at Chippenham on 29 January 1855 and arrived in the Crimea on 10 February 1856. He soon made contact with his brother, now a corporal and a veteran of the Battles of Balaklava and Inkerman, and transferred into the 57th Regiment on 6 March. All fighting had by now finished and Bezar was among the working parties employed on reinterring the dead and erecting cemetery walls.

== Aden ==
In September 1857, news came of civil unrest in the Aden Settlement. Two companies of the 57th, one of which was Bezar's, were detached at once and arrived off Aden on 13 October. The 57th Regiment was involved in frequent skirmishes with the local population while posted there from 1857 to 1860. Bezar and the Aden companies embarked for India in March 1860, to re-join the rest of the regiment then stationed at Puna, Gujarat.

== New Zealand Wars ==
In 1860, further unrest in New Zealand prompted the 57th Regiment to be sent there as reinforcements. Bezar's ship entered Auckland harbour on 21 January 1861. Promoted to Sergeant in August, Edwin Bezar fought in the Second Taranaki War and saw a considerable amount of action between 1863 and 1866.

Bezar was particularly proud of the part he played in the capture of the young Maori leader Hori Teira at Poutoko Redoubt, New Plymouth on 25 May 1863. He later met Hori Teira in Molesworth Street, Wellington in 1908, some 45 years later, and they discussed the incident cordially, Hori Teira presenting his side of the incident to Bezar. Bezar was at the Battle of Katikara on 4 June 1863; the capture of the Kaitake Pa on 11 March 1864 and Kakeramea Pa on 13 March 1865; and the battle of Otapawa Pa on 13 January 1866. When Captain Lloyd's detachment of the 57th in Kakaramea was attacked and that officer killed on 1 October 1865, Sergeant Bezar commanded the relief party from New Plymouth.

His obituary reports his being present at the Battle of "Kaierau" or Kairau, but this is inaccurate because the battle took place on 29 December 1860, pre-dating the 57th Regiment's arrival in New Zealand by a month. It states, "nine of the regiment were killed" and so is probably confused with Wairau, the Maori ambush of 4 May 1863 that preceded Hori Teira's capture.

Bezar had been a Sergeant for nearly five years when he was made Colour Sergeant on 15 May 1866. In 1866 the 57th Regiment was recalled to England. On 25 May 1867, Edwin Bezar was "discharged with gratuity" at Auckland, having married and decided to settle in New Zealand.

== Later life ==
Bezar was appointed sergeant major with the Wanganui District Militia in September, 1868. He was employed by the New Zealand Defence Department for nearly 25 years. During that time he was responsible for establishing the first School Cadet force in New Zealand, in 1872; invented a new system of target musketry for training; and organised the first Maori Rifle Corps of Volunteers. In 1891 Bezar published his memoirs of the New Zealand Wars. In 1892 he retired to Wellington, where he lived at 19 Rintoul Street, becoming a respected local figure. Bezar was often presented to dignitaries on official visits to New Zealand including Governor-General Viscount Jellicoe in 1920 and H.R.H. The Prince of Wales, Colonel-in-Chief of the Middlesex Regiment in 1922, and he was given a signed photograph of the latter meeting.

He was a prolific correspondent with the Middlesex Regiment's Journal and his letters and reminiscences were published there over many years. He was an interviewee of the author James Cowan for the writer's two-volume account of the New Zealand Wars.

He died in Wellington Hospital on 6 February 1936, twelve days short of his 98th birthday. He is buried at Karori Cemetery, Wellington.

His New Zealand War Medal 1845–66 was acquired at auction by the National Army Museum, London in 2002 in "extremely fine" condition for £1200.
