= French frigate Sirène (1823) =

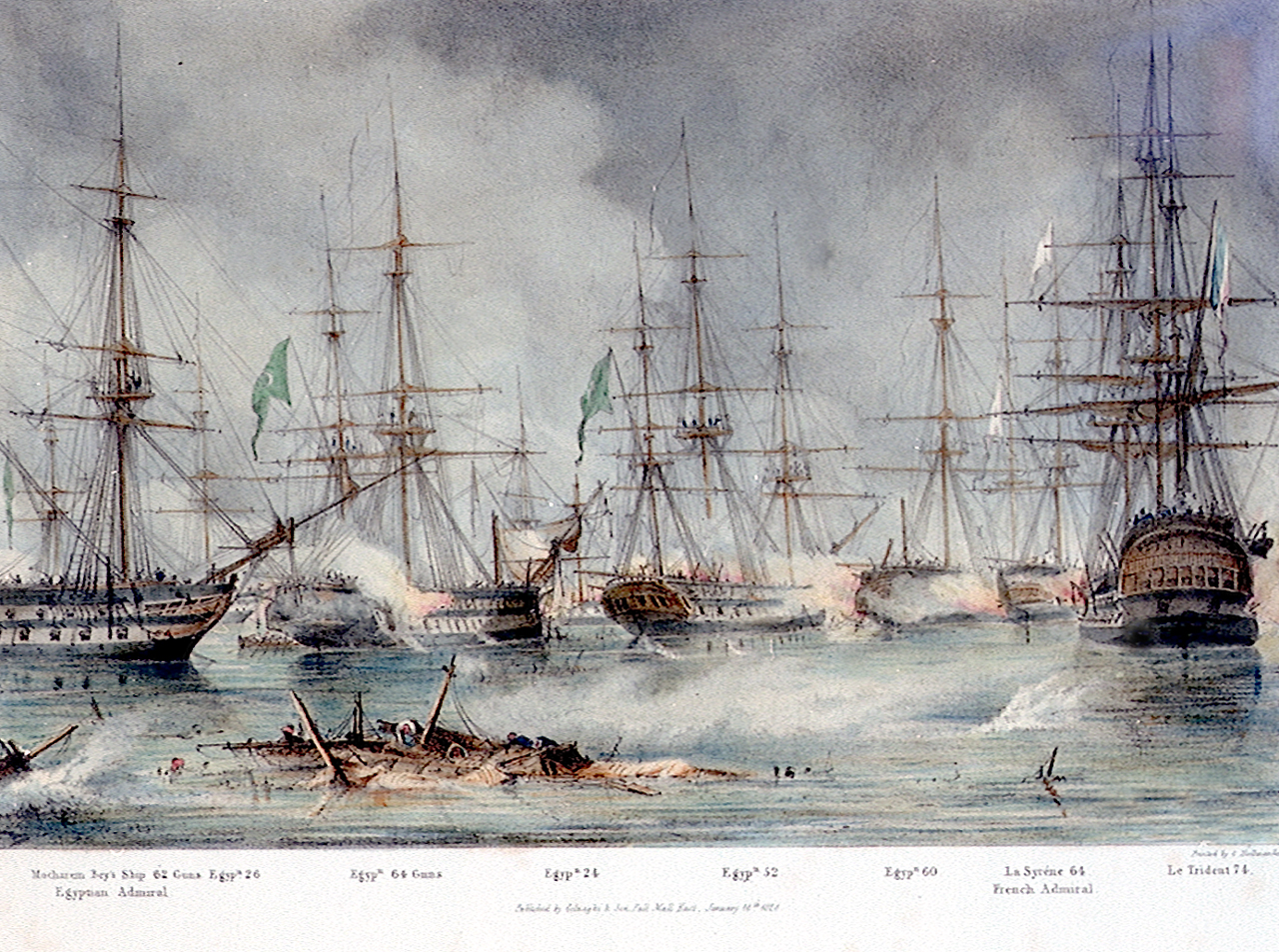
- La Sirène at the Battle of Navarino, 20 Oct 1827, drawn by George Philip Reinagle on HMS Mosquito

History

France
- Name: Sirène
- Builder: Garnier Saint-Maurice and Pestel, Toulon Dockyard
- Laid down: July 1820
- Launched: 25 July 1823
- Commissioned: 3 December 1824
- Stricken: 20 July 1861
- Fate: Broken up 1871

General characteristics
- Displacement: 2,300 tonne
- Length: 51.95m
- Beam: 13.16m
- Complement: 441
- Armament: 1823: (1824); Gundeck:28 × 24-pounder long guns; Spardeck:22 × 24-pounder carronades; 1836: Gundeck:26 × 24-pounder long gun + 2 × 22cm-Paixhans guns; Spardeck:20 × 24-pounder carronades + 4 × 16cm-Paixhans guns

Sirène (or Syrène) was launched in 1823 as a Vestale-class frigate, which owed their design to Pail Filhon. In 1825 she was under the command of capitaine de vaisseau (later contre-amiral) Marie Henri Daniel Gauthier, comte de Rigny (Henri de Rigny), who commanded the French Navy's Levant Division. Sirène was Admiral Henri de Rigny's flagship at the Battle of Navarino, where he commanded the French division.

In 1831 she was involved in the events prior to the Battle of the Tagus, but does not appear to have participated in the battle itself.

She probably served as a 2-gun transport during the Crimean War. She was struck in 1861. She then served as a coal hulk at Brest until she was broken up in 1871.
