= Alexander Imich =

Polish–American scientist (1903–2014)

- Imich in 2008
- Born: February 4, 1903; Częstochowa, Congress Poland, Russian Empire
- Died: June 8, 2014 (aged 111 years, 124 days); New York City, US
- Occupations: Parapsychologist; zoologist; writer; chemist
- Known for: World's oldest verified living man (24 April 2014 - 8 June 2014)
- Military career
- Allegiance: Second Polish Republic
- Branch: Polish Army
- Service years: 1918
- Unit: Automobile Division.
- Conflicts: Polish–Soviet War

Alexander Imich (February 4, 1903 – June 8, 2014) was a Polish-American chemist, parapsychologist, zoologist and writer who was the president of the Anomalous Phenomena Research Center in New York City. He was born in 1903 in Częstochowa, Poland (then part of the Russian Empire) to a Jewish family.

Imich, a supercentenarian, also became the oldest living man at age 111 after the death of 111-year-old Arturo Licata, of Italy, on April 24, 2014. Until his own death a little more than a month later, aged 111 years and 124 days, Imich was certified by Guinness World Records as the world's oldest living man.

Imich was also the last surviving veteran of the Polish-Soviet War.

== Early war service ==
Imich stated that, at age 15, he and the rest of his class joined the Polish forces to fight the Bolsheviks in 1918. His older brother reportedly served as an instructor in the automobile division, so Imich learned to drive trucks for the army until the Bolshevik forces were pushed back and Imich returned to school.

== Academic career ==
He earned a PhD in zoology at the Jagiellonian University in Kraków in 1929, but as he could not find an academic position in zoology, he switched to chemistry. During the 1920s and 1930s he did some research on a medium, Matylda, for the Polish Society for Psychical Research. He published a report in 1932 in a German journal called Zeitschrift für Parapsychologie, but all of the unpublished notes and photos from the research were lost during World War II.

Alexander Imich was already mentioned in a couple of psychist English-language books and journals as early as 1933 and 1934.

== World War II ==
During World War II, Imich and his wife Wela (pronounced Vela) fled to Soviet-occupied Białystok, where he was employed as a chemist. The couple were later interned in a special settlement due to their refusal to accept Soviet citizenship. They were released under the amnesty for Polish citizens in the Soviet Union in September 1941. They chose to emigrate to the U.S. in 1952, as almost all of their Polish relatives and friends were murdered in the Holocaust.

== Life in the United States ==
In 1952, Imich and Wela (who died in 1986) emigrated to the United States, first to Pennsylvania and then to New York, dividing their time between both places. To make a living, Imich initially took up chemistry, but once Wela made a career for herself as a psychologist in 1965, he turned to parapsychology. After becoming a widower, he continued his lifelong interest in parapsychology, giving out the Imich prize for parapsychology research for several years until he began experiencing financial problems.

Imich wrote numerous papers for journals in the field and edited a book, Incredible Tales of the Paranormal, which was published by Bramble Books in 1995. He formed the Anomalous Phenomena Research Center in 1999, trying to find a way to produce "The Crucial Demonstration", the goal of which is to demonstrate the reality of paranormal phenomena to mainstream scientists and the general public. In 2012, he began to transfer the records of his research into the paranormal to the University of Manitoba Department of Archives and Special Collections.

Imich suffered a fall either on or shortly before his 111th birthday—with him spending his 111th birthday in the New York City's Roosevelt Hospital. After his release from Roosevelt Hospital, Imich belatedly celebrated his 111th birthday either in late April or early May 2014. In April 2014, Imich's home attendant told Rabbi Pinny Marozov that, in his opinion, Alexander Imich could live for another couple of years, indicating that Imich was still in good health during this time.

After being the world's oldest living man for approximately six weeks, Alexander Imich died on June 8, 2014, at 9:03 AM from natural causes aged 111. He was succeeded as the world's oldest man by Sakari Momoi of Japan (who was born on February 5, 1903, just one day after Imich). Imich attributed his long life to good genetics, decent nutrition and exercise, and not having children. Imich donated his body to Mount Sinai Medical Center for medical research.
