= Auld Dubrach =

Survivor of the Jacobite Uprising

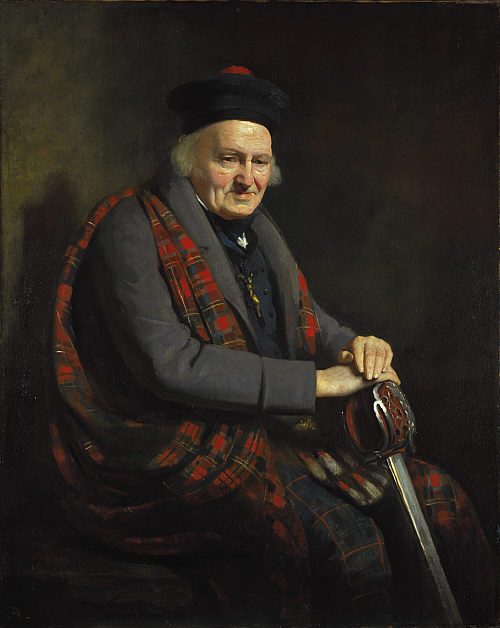
Patrick Grant [Pàdraig Grannd an Dubh-bhruaich], 1713 / 1714 - 1824, by Colvin Smith, 1822

Peter Grant (1714?–February 11, 1824), known as Auld Dubrach, was the last known survivor of the Jacobite rising of 1745. According to folklore he was introduced to King George IV in 1822 during his visit to Edinburgh as "His Majesty's oldest enemy". However, this story is probably not true.

A portrait of him resides in the Scottish National Portrait Gallery.
