= George Frederick Ives =

English-Canadian supercentenarian (1881–1993)

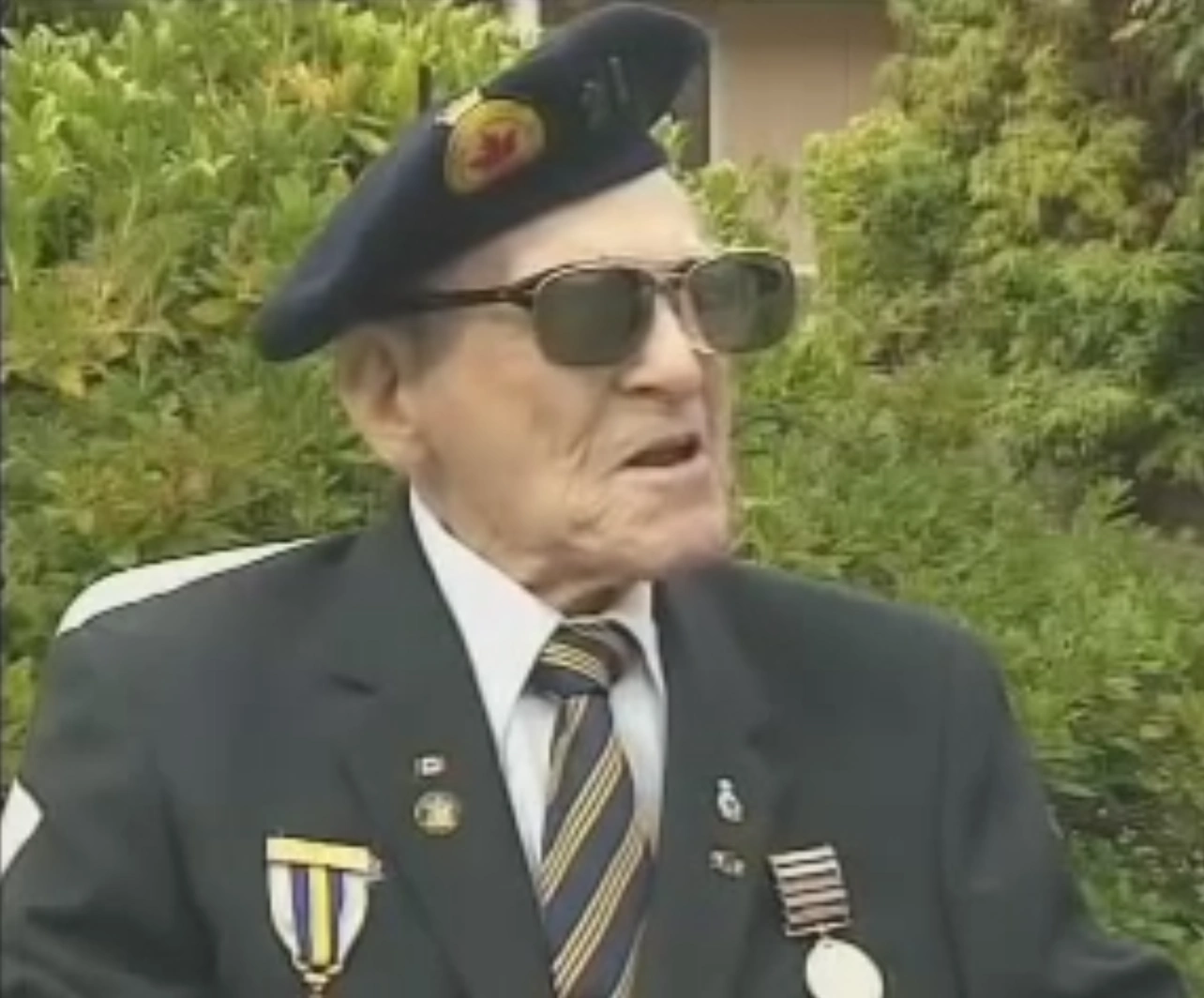
- Ives in 1992
- Born: 17 November 1881; Brighton, East Sussex, England
- Died: 12 April 1993 (aged 111 years, 146 days); White Rock, British Columbia, Canada
- Spouse: Kay Nelson Ives
- Military career
- Allegiance: United Kingdom
- Branch: British Army
- Service years: 1900–1901; 1901–1902
- Rank: Trooper
- Units: 2nd Volunteer Battalion, Bristol Engineers; 1st (Wiltshire) Company, Imperial Yeomanry
- Conflicts: Second Boer War
- Awards: Queen's South Africa Medal with 5 clasps

George Frederick Ives (17 November 1881 – 12 April 1993) was a British Canadian army veteran, who became known as the last surviving veteran of the Boer War. Ives became known in the UK after a piece in the Peterborough Column in the Daily Telegraph. His record as oldest British veteran, at 111 years, 146 days, of any war was broken on 1 November 2007 by First World War veteran Henry Allingham.

== Early life ==
George Ives was born in Brighton, England on November 17, 1881. The family worked for the Tidmarsh family. He worked in his father's workshop in Bristol until 1899. That December, Ives was eager to enlist after hearing that the British had been defeated at Colenso and Magersfontein. Ives served in England as a private in the 2nd Volunteer Battalion, Bristol Engineers from 1900 to 1901.

== Boer War ==
In the Boer War, George Ives fought with the Imperial Yeomanry of the British Army in South Africa. On January 30, 1901, Ives attested for service as a Trooper, number 21198, with the 1st (Wiltshire) Company, 1st Battalion, Imperial Yeomanry. His height was 5'6", his eyes dark blue, hair black, and trade listed as a grocer. He trained in England until the end of February, when he proceeded to South Africa.

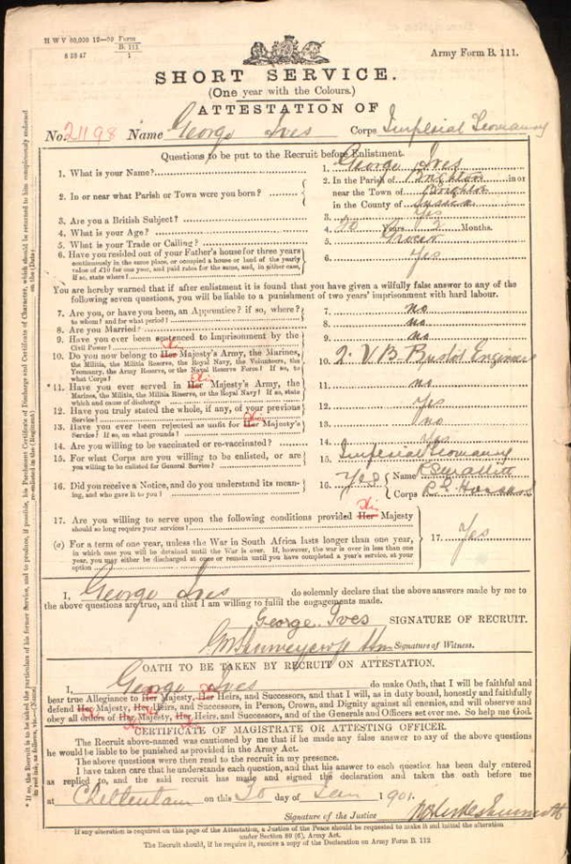
Attestation papers of George Ives for the Imperial Yeomanry, 1901

Ives served in South Africa from March 1, 1901 to August 27, 1902, fighting on patrols in the Transvaal, Orange Free State, and the Cape Colony. In an interview many years later, Ives described these patrols:

- "We started out in the morning early, had a good camp breakfast, filled our water cans up with coffee, and we went. Before the sun was up any strength at all, nearly all the drink had gone. We was [out] all day and we'd chew stones in our mouth and try and agitate a little saliva. Finally we got to the end of the trip and fell off the horse, the horse was thirsty too, and we'd throw some water in our mouths and on the back of our neck, and when we looked up [we] discovered there was two dead mules in the same pond, but it didn't matter about mules rotting, you had to satisfy your thirst."

In the same interview Ives recalled his proudest moment during the war:

- "The most important [moment] was when the Captain had us fall in, get in line, it was after supper, at night, and when they were all there he said 'Ives take ten paces forward' and I stepped forward ten paces, and he says to the company: 'here is the man who was scouting through 70 miles of enemy territory several times'. The captain then said give him a cheer, and they said 'hoorah, hoorah' and I went back in line."

Ives was discharged in England on September 3, 1902 and for his service in South Africa, he was awarded the Queen's South Africa Medal with clasps for Cape Colony, Orange Free State, Transvaal, South Africa 1901, and South Africa 1902.

== Later life ==
A 21-year-old Ives emigrated to Canada in 1903 with his father and purchased 160 acres (0.65 km^{2}) of land for ten dollars. On that land in Alberta he began to farm and would spend most of his life doing so. He was rejected from service in World War I because of a heart murmur.

In 1910, he married Kay Nelson. The couple had three sons and three daughters. Nelson disliked the hard life of the Canadian Prairies, so in 1919 the family moved to White Rock, British Columbia. Ives owned a farm there and eventually retired from it in 1941. He looked and found another job because he said that his retirement was an excuse to change jobs. He worked in a shipyard building wooden scows for another 15 years until 1956, when he finally announced his retirement.

George and Kay Ives lived in the same house for most of their married life, finally moving into a retirement home in 1984. His wife died in 1987 after 77 years of marriage. He attended the Royal Albert Hall service on Remembrance Day in November 1992 in the UK and met The Queen, former prime minister Margaret Thatcher, and the current prime minister John Major. At the time, he was the last living veteran entitled to wear a Queen Victoria Medal and laid a wreath at the memorial. Ives died on 12 April 1993 aged 111 years, 146 days in White Rock, British Columbia, Canada.

== See also ==
- List of last surviving veterans of military insurgencies and wars

== Sources ==
- Davies, David T. (1996). Canada From Afar. Dundurn Press. ISBN 1-55002-252-0.
