= Ivan Beshoff =

Russian-born Irish restaurateur

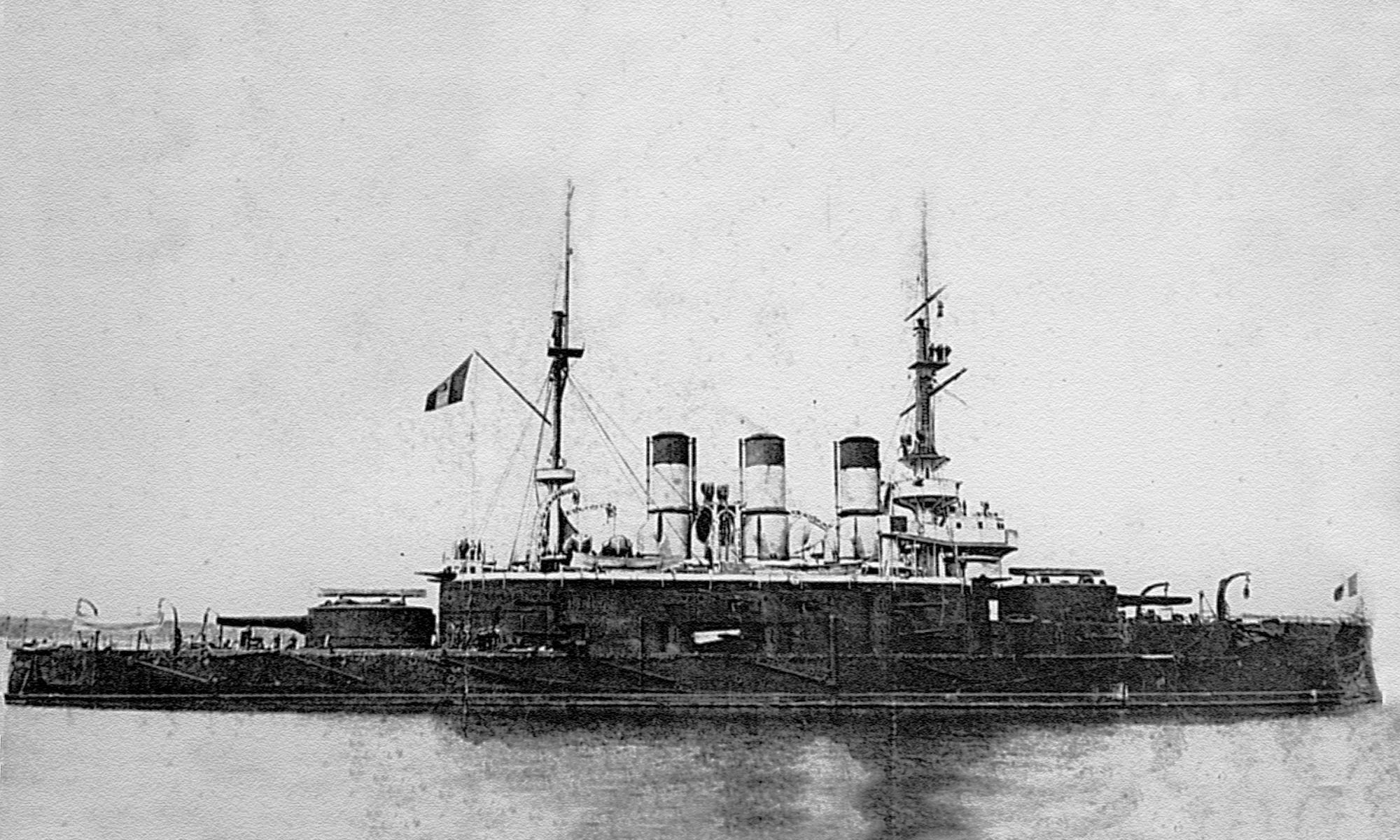
The Potemkin in 1905

Ivan Beshoff (Russian: Иван Бешов, romanized: Ivan Beshov; 1882/84 – 25 October 1987) was a Russian participant in the 1905 mutiny on the battleship Potemkin. After the mutiny he fled to Britain where he met Vladimir Lenin and Irish republican James Larkin. Developing an interest in Ireland, he moved to Dublin in 1913, and later found work as an agent for the Soviet-owned company Russian Oil Products. He was arrested on suspicion of espionage. The company collapsed in 1940. Sometime after, he established a fish and chip shop, that survives as a chain in Dublin run by his descendants.

== Biography ==
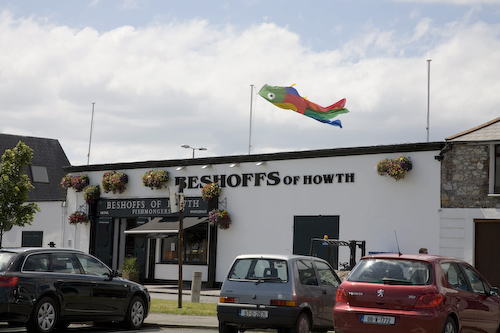
Beshoff's in Howth

Beshoff was born at Dacha Rurey near Odesa, Ukraine, then part of the Russian Empire. His birth certificate gives his year of birth as 1884 but he stated that it was 1882. He was the son of a magistrate and briefly studied chemistry before running away to join the Russian Navy. Beshoff was posted to the engine room of the battleship Potemkin. During the Russian Revolution of 1905 (and the Russo-Japanese War), on 27 June, the crew of the Potemkin mutinied over mistreatment by their officers. After killing the captain and some of the officers the ship sailed for 11 days before finding refuge in Constanța, Romania.

Beshoff travelled via Turkey to Britain. In London by 1911 he met Vladimir Lenin, who introduced him to the Irish republican and socialist James Larkin. Beshoff thereafter developed an interest in Ireland. Passing through Dublin en route to Canada in 1913 he missed his connection and decided to remain in the city, finding work as the Irish agent for Russian Oil Products (ROP), a company run by the Soviet government. He was twice arrested by Irish authorities, once in 1922 on suspicion of espionage and once in 1932 on unknown charges.

ROP ceased trading in 1940 and shortly after this (during or after the Second World War) Beshoff opened a fish and chip shop on North Strand Road in Dublin. He later moved the business to Usher's Quay and then Sundrive Road. Beshoff married an Irish woman, Nora Dunne, and they had five sons and a daughter. Nora died in 1975. The fish and chip shop continues in family ownership, and Beshoff witnessed it moving to new premises in Westmoreland Street in 1986, with an opening presided over by former Taoiseach Charles Haughey. The shop is now known as Beshoffs Restaurant and is run by the third generation of the family.

Beshoff was known to his friends in Ireland as John. He remained a follower of the Russian Orthodox church and visited the USSR three times in 1927, 1937 and 1962. He died in Ireland on 25 October 1987. He was the last surviving participant of the Potemkin mutiny.
