= Alois Vocásek =

Czechoslovak World War I veteran

- Born: 18 April 1896; Pečky, Bohemia, Austria-Hungary
- Died: 9 August 2003 (aged 107); Prague, Czech Republic
- Military career
- Allegiance: Czechoslovakia
- Branch: (Czechoslovakia) Czechoslovak Legions
- Conflicts: World War I: Eastern Front; Battle of Zborov; Russian Civil War: Eastern Front
- Other work: Fascist organisation Vlajka in the 1930s

Alois Vocásek (13 April 1896 – 9 August 2003) was a Czech soldier. He was the last surviving Czechoslovak veteran of the World War I and the last survivor of the Battle of Zborov in Ukraine. He was one of thousands of Czechs and Slovaks who broke with the Austro-Hungarian monarchy to fight for the future Czechoslovak state as members of the Czechoslovak Legions. He was later controversial because of his membership in the Czech fascist/nationalist organisation Vlajka in the 1930s.

He was the oldest member of the Seventh-day Adventist Church in the Czech Republic. He is buried at the Olšany Cemetery.

== See also ==
- List of last surviving World War I veterans by country
