= Boris Gudz =

Russian veteran and security official (1902–2006)

- Born: 17 August 1902; Ufa, Russian Empire
- Died: 27 December 2006 (aged 104); Moscow, Russia
- Military career
- Allegiance: Russian SFSR; Soviet Union
- Branch: OGPU
- Unit: Red Army

Boris Ignatyvich Gudz (Russian: Борис Игнатьевич Гудзь; 17 August 1902 – 27 December 2006) was a Russian centenarian and veteran of the October Revolution and the Russian Civil War as well as an OGPU security agent. At the time of his death, he was one of the last surviving veterans of the Russian Civil War and the last surviving member of Cheka, the secret police of the Soviet Union from 1917 to 1922.

== Biography ==
Gudz was born at Ufa in the Russian Empire, where his parents moved following a revolutionary movement in Ukraine. He joined the Bolshevik Party in his early teens after his father was arrested for revolutionary activity. He participated in the October Revolution and later fought in the Red Army against the White Army during the Russian Civil War. In 1923, Gudz began his career in the State Political Directorate (OGPU) as a junior member of the staff involved in Operation Trust. He claimed to have witnessed the execution of British spy Sidney Reilly in a forest near Moscow in 1925. Later, he was appointed head of the OGPU intelligence and counterintelligence department in East Siberia, and then in 1933 in Japan.

In 1937, after his sister was arrested during the Great Purge, he was expelled from the Soviet Communist Party and dismissed from the Red Army, but was soon restored to the Party and the Army.

Gudz died on 27 December 2006, aged 104 years. His funeral ceremony took place in Moscow. When he died, he was the last surviving veteran of the October Revolution. He was buried in Moscow at Novodevichy Cemetery.

The Russian writer and Gulag survivor Varlam Shalamov was his brother-in-law.

== Photos ==
- 1936: http://shalamov.ru/gallery/57/3.html
- 1955-56: http://shalamov.ru/media/images/gallery/579.jpg
- Boris Gudz as a centenarian, records file in hand: Файл:Борис Игнатьевич Гудзь.jpg
