= Lily Kempson =

Irish revolutionary (1897–1996)

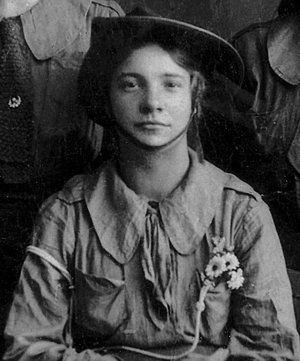
- Kempson photographed in 1914
- Born: Elizabeth Anne Kempson; 17 January 1897; County Wicklow, Ireland
- Died: 21 January 1996 (aged 99); Seattle, Washington, U.S.

Lily Kempson (born Elizabeth Anne Kempson; 17 January 1897 – 21 January 1996) was an Irish revolutionary who took part in the 1916 Easter Rising in Dublin. She is remembered as a trade union activist and lecturer, as well as an insurrectionist in the Irish Citizen Army. She was the last surviving participant of the Easter Rising.

== Early life ==
Kempson was born into an impoverished Catholic family in County Wicklow, Ireland. She and her family moved to Dublin when she was a child. The Kempsons, including her father James, a railway porter, mother Esther Moore Kempson, 92-year-old grandmother Mary Moore, Lily and her eight siblings, shared a two-room tenement home in 8 Piles Building situated between Golden Lane and Wood Street in Dublin's Liberties area close to the City Centre.

In 1913, aged 16, during the Dublin lock-out, she was arrested and on 14 November imprisoned for two weeks in Mountjoy Gaol for participating in a strike at Jacob's Biscuit Factory in Bishop Street, Dublin where she had been employed since 1911. She was also charged with assaulting a fellow worker Jane Timmons. She and the other strikers objected to the harsh working conditions inside the factory. She lost her job as a result of her participation in the strike.

Kempson was described in 1913 as having been small and slender with light brown hair, brown eyes and a sallow complexion.

Her father and two of her brothers, James and Patrick, served in the British Army in World War I.

== Activism ==
By the age of 19, Kempson had become involved in the trade union movement working out of Dublin's Liberty Hall. Like many of the most militant women sacked from Jacob's during the lockout, she joined James Connolly's Irish Citizen Army, a small group of trained trade union volunteers from the Irish Transport and General Workers' Union (ITGWU) established in Dublin for the defence of worker's demonstrations from the police. She eventually joined the rebel Irish Volunteers.

During the Easter Rebellion which lasted the Easter Week of 24–29 April, she was dispatched to help take over St. Stephen's Green. She was given a gun and instructed "you’ve got to use this, but be careful who you hit." When one of the other insurrectionists attempted to abandon the group, she pointed the firearm at him and explained that "no one was leaving". During the siege of Dublin, which lasted a week, Kempson served as a courier for Padraic Pearse and the others insurrectionists inside the General Post Office, risking her life as she dodged snipers. Frank Robbins, a fighter in the Irish Citizens Army, noted that Commandant Michael Mallin "had actually to avail of the services of members of the women's section of the Citizen Army...Constance Markievicz, Lily Kempson and Mary Hyland gave invaluable assistance."

Kempson claimed that as part of a group of seven, led by Malkin and Markiewicz, she slashed the portrait of Queen Victoria when the group occupied the Royal College of Surgeons located at St. Stephens Green.

When the insurrection was put down on 29 April, Kempson was marked for arrest and imprisonment, but fled to Liverpool where she sailed for the United States using her sister's passport. In recognition of her role in the 1916 Rising, Kempson received medals as well a monthly pension from the Irish government.

== Personal life ==
Shortly after she arrived in the United States and settled in Seattle, Washington, Kempson married Matthew McAlerney, an Irish immigrant from County Down. The marriage took place on 27 February 1917 and couple went on to have seven children, Kathleen, Alice, Matthew, John, James, Betty and Peggy. She was a great-great-grandmother of five at the time of her death in Seattle at the age of 99.
