= Vestier =

Vestier is a surname. Notable people with the surname include:

- Antoine Vestier (1740–1824), French miniaturist
- Marie-Nicole Vestier (1767–1846), French painter
