= Touraine Regiment =

Régiment de Touraine
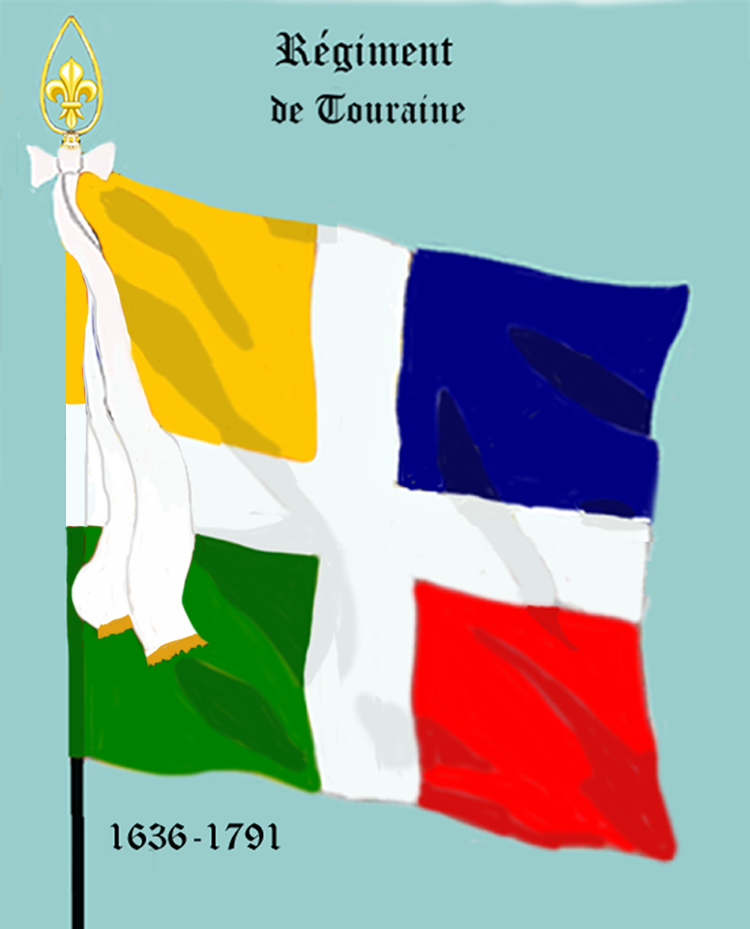
- Colours of the Régiment de Touraine
- Active: 1625–1791
- Country: France
- Allegiance: France
- Branch: French Army
- Type: Infantry
- Garrison/HQ: Tours
- Engagements: Huguenot rebellions Franco-Spanish War (1635–1659); Franco-Dutch War; War of the Reunions; Nine Years War; War of the Spanish Succession; War of the Polish Succession; War of the Austrian Succession; Seven Years' War; American Revolutionary War

Founded in 1625, the Régiment de Touraine was a French infantry regiment raised in the province of Touraine.

== Origins ==
At the end of 1624, the Protestant stronghold of La Rochelle sent an expedition and besieged Port Louis in Brittany. As no troops were stationed in this province at this time, Louis XIII sent Marshal Bassompierre, which, from Angers, urged Baron du Plessis-Joigny, governor of this city, to create an infantry regiment. The Protestant expedition on Port-Louis was cancelled before the arrival of the newly raised regiment, but it victoriously took part to the siege of the rebellious city between 1627 and 1628.

In May 1636 the regiment received the name of Touraine and its regimental flags. During the Fronde the colonels took advantage of the weakening of royal authority and did away with the provincial title of their regiments. Subsequently, the Touraine regiment appeared as the Régiment d'Amboise, de Kercado or de Chambellay according to the name of its colonel.

== Franco-Spanish War ==
During the Franco-Spanish War, the Regiment de Touraine participated to the Italian campaign where it successfully attacked Spanish possessions in Northern Italy, including Ceva, Pianezza, Mondovì and took part to the famous siege of Turin.

== Franco-Dutch War and War of the Reunions ==
After Turenne's death, the regiment participated to the siege of Valenciennes (1676-1677) the Battle of Cassel (1677) and the Siege of Luxembourg (1684).

== War of the Austrian Succession ==
The regiment was present at the battle of Fontenoy 1745 and the sieges of Tournai, Termonde and Ath. In 1746 it fought at the battle of Rocoux and the siege of Namur. In 1747 it was at the battle of Lauffeld and participated at the siege of Bergen op Zoom. It was at the siege of Maastricht in 1748.

== Seven Years' War ==
In 1757 Touraine fought at battle of Hastenbeck. It was at the battle of Krefeld in 1758. The regiment was present at the battle of Minden in 1759 and the siege of Mǚnster. It fought at Warburg in 1760, covering the retreat of the army.

== American Revolutionary War ==
The regiment, commanded by Vicomte de Poudeux, was among forces under Saint Simon brought from the West Indies to Yorktown. Régiment de Touraine principal engagements: Yorktown; St Christophe; Les Saintes.

== French Revolution ==
In 1791, the provincial names of the French regiments were abolished and a number was assigned to each of them. Thus the regiment of Touraine became the 33rd line infantry regiment.

== Gallery ==
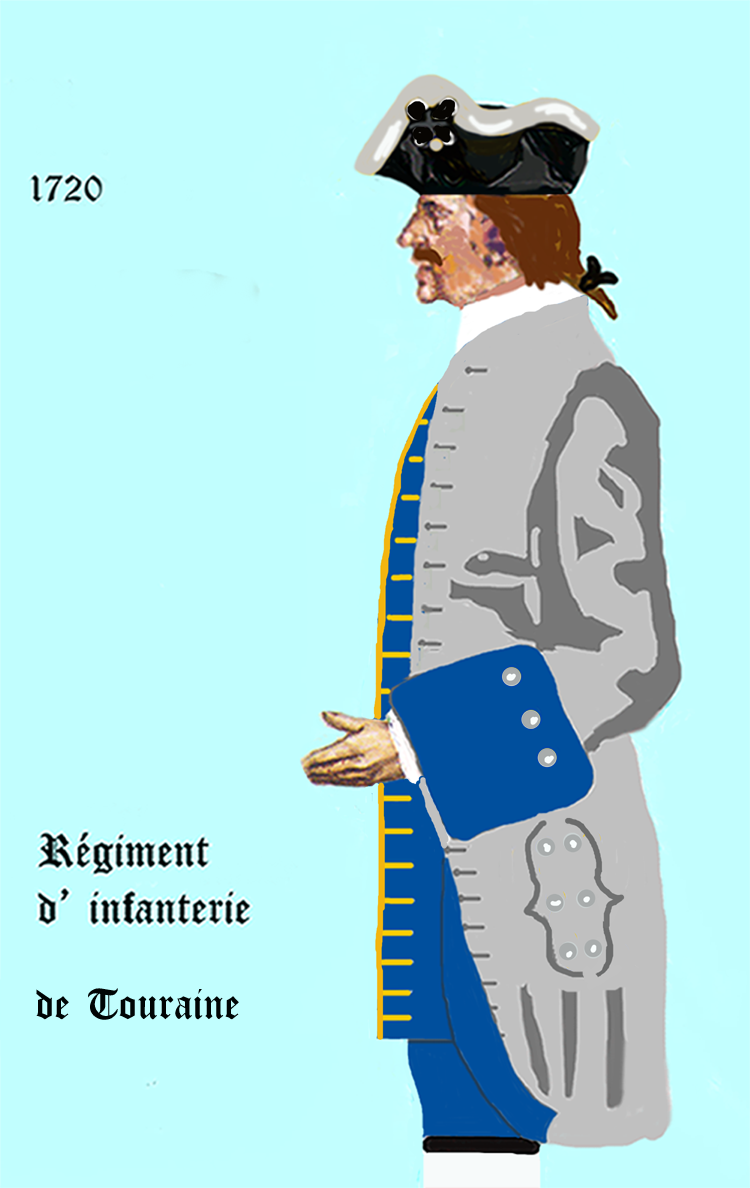
Uniform of a fusilier of the Régiment de Touraine in 1720

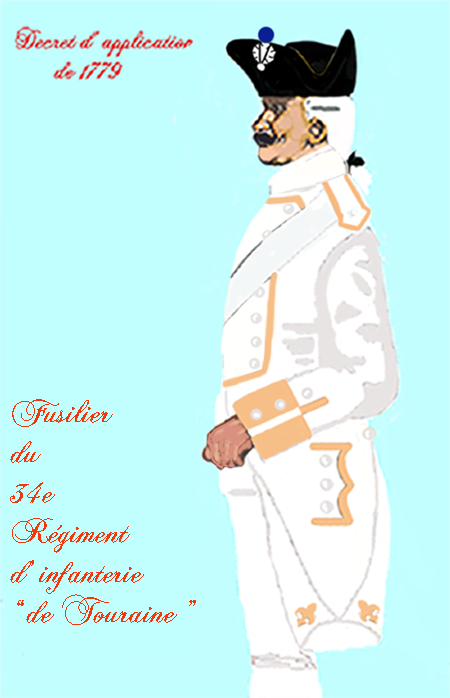
Uniform of a fusilier of the Régiment de Touraine in 1779.

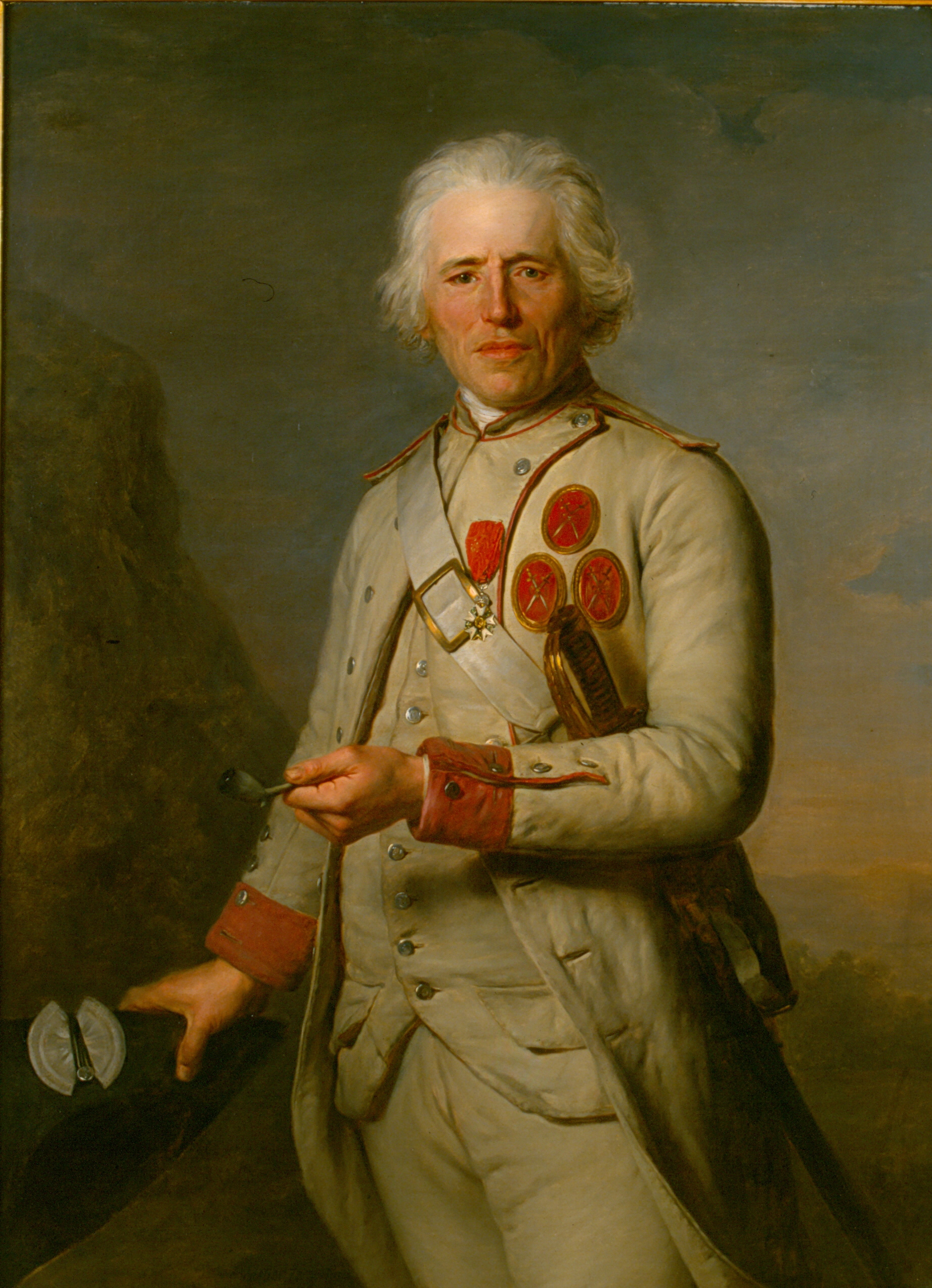
Jean Thurel, in 1788, the "oldest soldier of Europe" in his uniform of fusilier of the Touraine Regiment with his three veteran medals and his Légion d'Honneur (added to the painting in 1804), painting by Antoine Vestier.

== See also ==
- Jean Thurel
