= Médaillon Des Deux Épées =

French military award

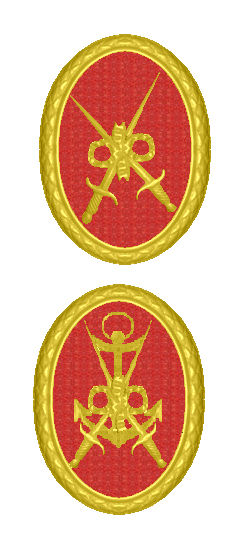
- Medals of the Two Swords (army and navy).
- Awarded for: 24 years of service
- Presented by: France
- Eligibility: Soldiers, sailors and non-commissioned officers
- Status: Not awarded since 1795
- Established: 16 April 1771

The Médaillon Des Deux Épées (Medallion of the Two Swords – commonly known as the "Medallion of Veterancy", Médaillion de Vétérance, in French) was a French military award in the 18th century.

The medal was established on 16 April 1771 by King Louis XV for the Army, and on 25 December 1774 by King Louis XVI for the Navy. It was created to encourage non-commissioned officers and other ranks with at least 24 years of service, but could not receive the Order of Saint Louis or the Institution of Military Merit, to reenlist in the army or navy. The award came with exemptions from personal tax (Taille), Corvée work and soldiers' lodging. At the award ceremony, the recipient took an oath of loyalty to the king.

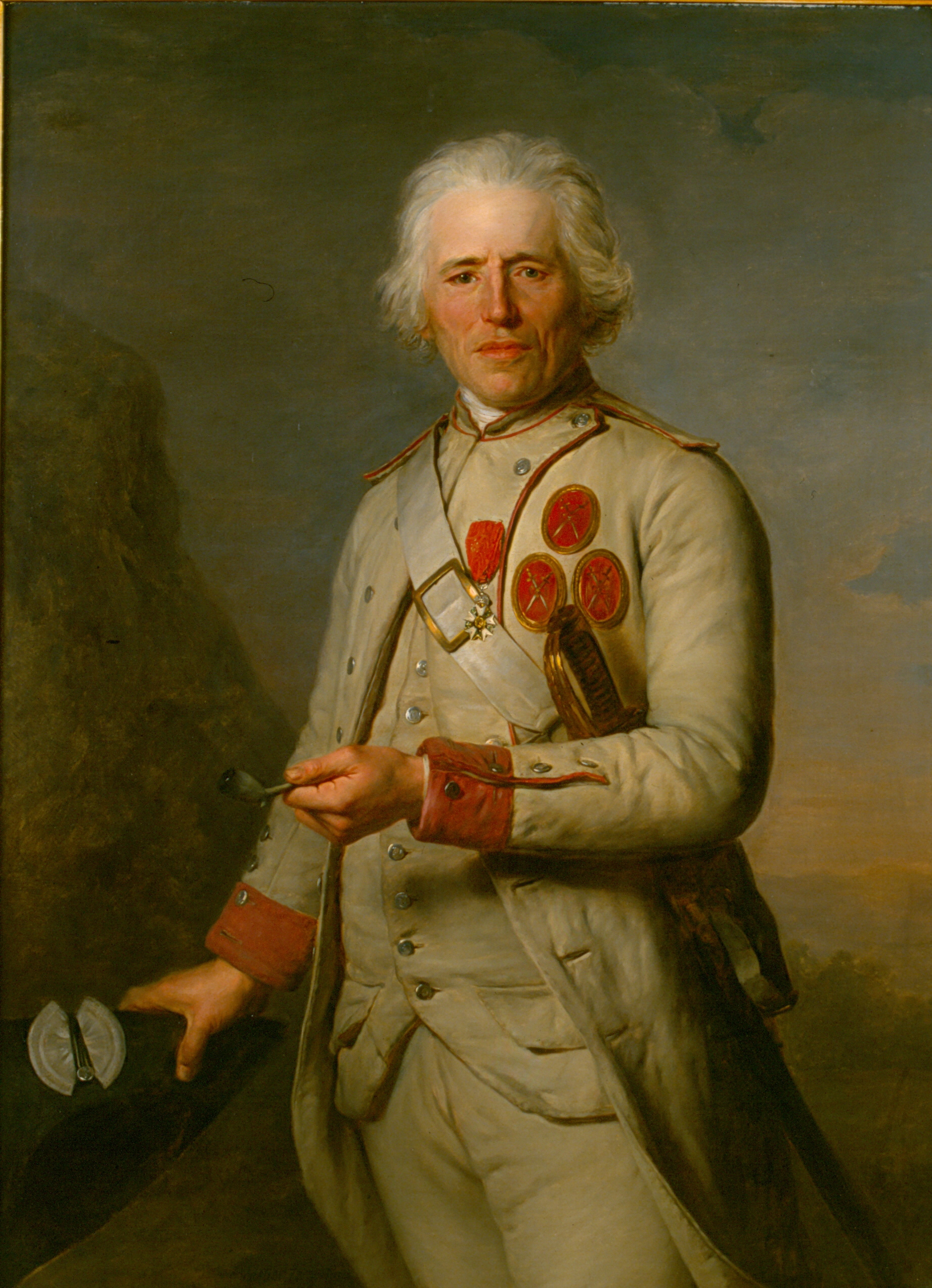
Jean Thurel, fusilier of the Touraine Regiment at 89 years of age. His three Médaillon Des Deux Épées and his Légion d'Honneur are visible in this 1788 portrait by Antoine Vestier, which was modified in 1804 to include the Légion d'Honneur.

The Médaillon Des Deux Épées consisted of two crossed swords tied together with a ribbon and surrounded by a laurel wreath on a red background. The naval version of the medal included an anchor superimposed over the swords. The first awards were made of cloth and sewn to the soldier's uniform. Later, the medal was made of metal, suspended from a red ribbon and worn in the same manner as the Royal and Military Order of Saint Louis. Soldiers with 48 years of service were eligible to receive the award a second time, and only one soldier, Jean Thurel (1699–1807), received the award three times.

It was a highly regarded medal among soldiers, and remained the only medal not removed by soldiers who participated in the French Revolution, despite its accompanying oath of loyalty to the king. Although military honors were abolished in 1792, the Médaillon Des Deux Épées continued to be awarded, but only to officers. No legislation is known to exist abolishing the award and it is known to have been awarded as late as 1795.

== See also ==
- Military awards and decorations of France
