= Jean Thurel =

French soldier (1698–1807)

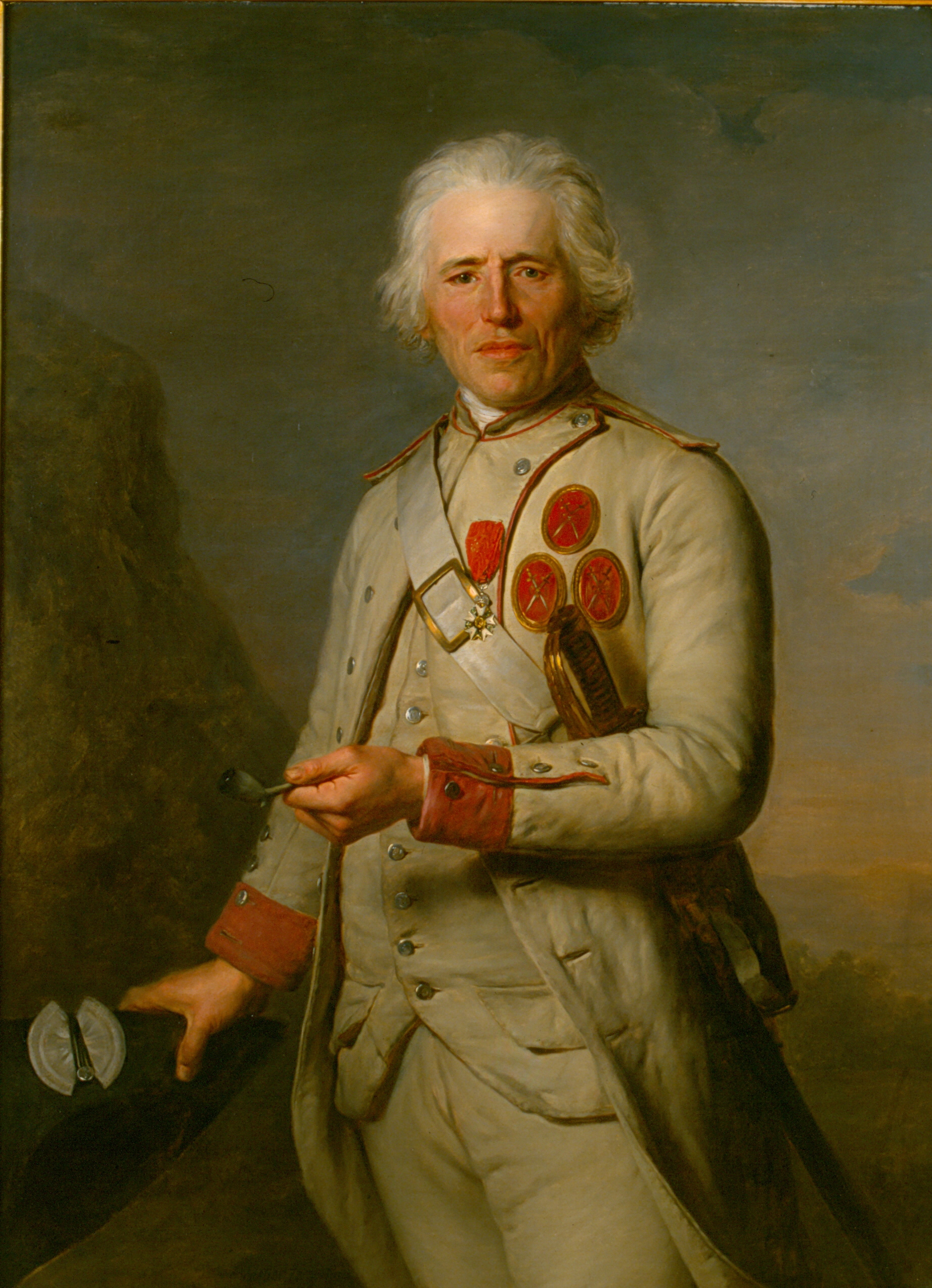
- Jean Thurel, fusilier of the Touraine Regiment at 89 years of age. His three Médaillon Des Deux Épées medals and his Légion d'Honneur medal are visible in this 1788 portrait by Antoine Vestier, which was modified in 1804 to include the Légion d'Honneur.
- Born: 6 September 1699; Orain, Burgundy, France
- Died: 10 March 1807 (aged 107); Tours, Indre-et-Loire, France
- Military career
- Allegiance: Kingdom of France; Kingdom of the French; French First Republic; First French Empire
- Branch: Infantry
- Service years: 17 September 1716 – 29 January 1792 (75 years, 4 months)
- Rank: Soldat
- Nickname: The oldest soldier of Europe
- Unit: Touraine Regiment
- Conflicts: War of the Polish Succession; War of the Austrian Succession; Seven Years' War; American Revolutionary War
- Awards: Médaillon Des Deux Épées (3); Chevalier de l' Ordre National de la Legion d'Honneur

Jean Thurel, or Jean Theurel (French pronunciation: [tyʁɛl]; 6 September 1699 – 10 March 1807), was a fusilier of the French Army and a centenarian with an extraordinarily long career that spanned over 75 years of service in the Touraine Regiment. Born in the reign of Louis XIV and dying during that of Napoleon I, Thurel was possibly the last known person born in the 17th century.

== Military career ==
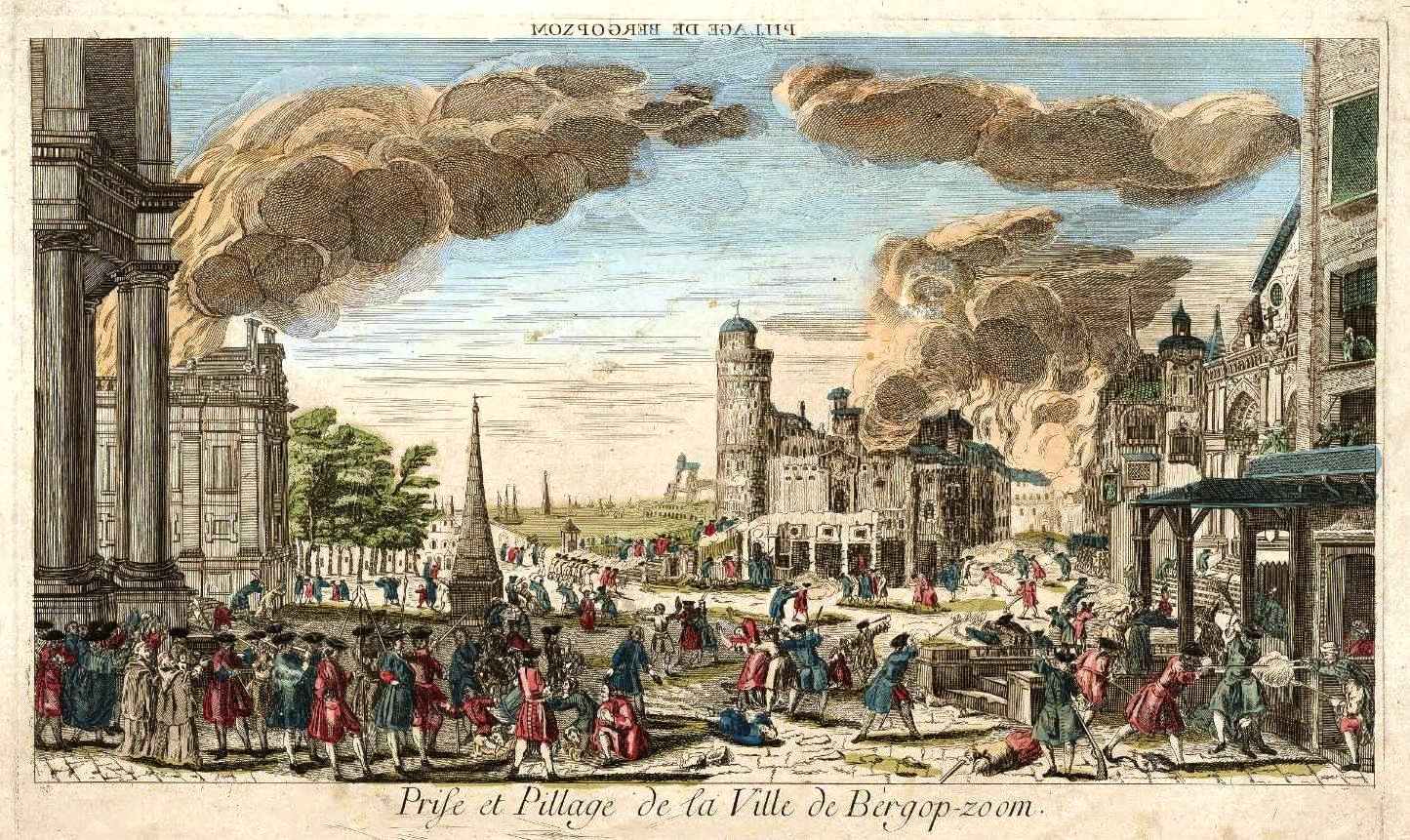
The 1747 Siege of Bergen, in which French forces under the command of the Comte de Lowendal defeated Dutch forces under the command of Governor General Cronström

Thurel was born in Orain, Burgundy in 1699. He enlisted on 17 September 1716 in the Régiment de Touraine at the age of 17 and served there for 75 years altogether, under Louis XV and Louis XVI, until 29 January 1792.

Thurel was severely wounded in battle on two occasions. In 1733, during the siege of Kehl, he was shot in the chest with a musket, and at the Battle of Minden in 1759, he received seven sword slashes, including six to the head. Three of his brothers were killed in the Battle of Fontenoy in 1745. One of Thurel's sons was a corporal and a veteran in the same company; he died at the Battle of the Saintes, a naval battle that occurred on 12 April 1782 off the coast of Dominica, West Indies during the American Revolutionary War.

A well-disciplined soldier of the line infantry, Thurel was admonished only once during his entire career, during the 1747 siege of Bergen op Zoom as the French troops occupied the citadel. He was admonished because, the doors of the fortress being shut, he scaled its walls to gain entry so that he would not miss muster. Another example of Thurel's discipline and physical fitness occurred in 1787. When his regiment was ordered to march to the coast to embark on ships of the French Navy, he was given the opportunity to travel in a carriage due to his advanced age. The 88-year-old Thurel refused the offer and marched the entire distance on foot, stating that he had never before traveled by carriage and had no intention of doing so at that time. His humility is evident in his steadfast refusal to accept any promotions; he remained a low-ranking fusilier for his entire military career.

== Honors and awards ==
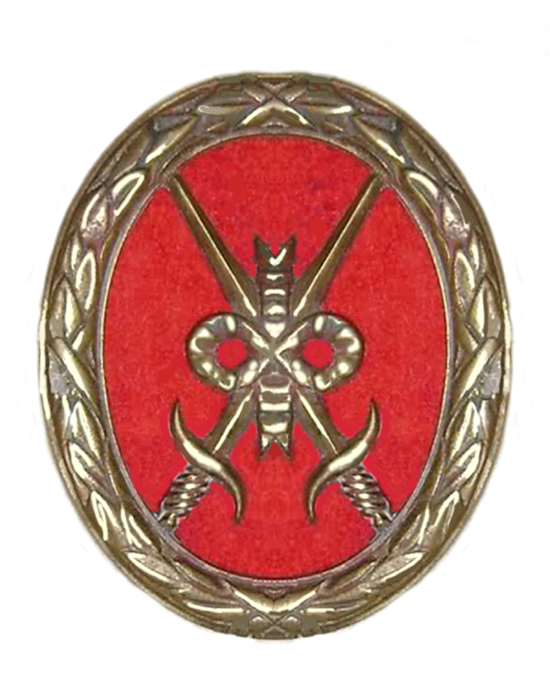
Thurel received three medals for service like this one.

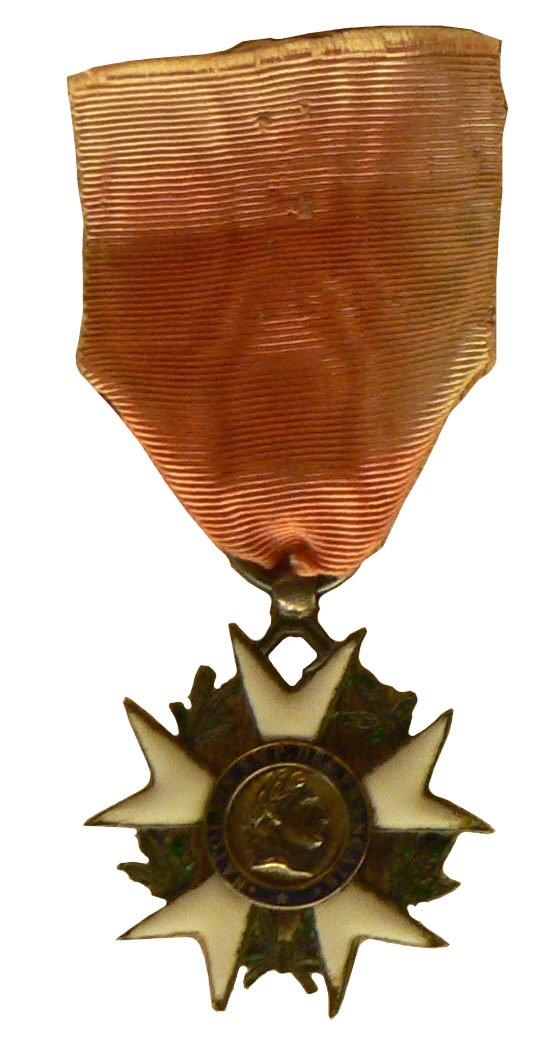
A similar Légion d'Honneur medal was awarded by Napoleon I to Thurel.

In hopes of improving re-enlistment rates, Louis XV established the Médaillon Des Deux Épées ('Medal of the Two Swords') by royal decree in 1771. This was the first military decoration in France for which an enlisted man could be eligible. This medal was initially awarded to soldiers who had served in the French Army, as a reward for their longevity of service. The decree was extended in 1774 so that sailors of the French Navy were also eligible to receive the medal. A soldier or sailor would have to serve for 24 years to be eligible for the Médaillon Des Deux Épées. Thurel was awarded two Médaillon Des Deux Épées in 1771, the year the medal was established, in recognition of the two 24-year periods of time (1716–1740 and 1740–1764) during which he had served up until then.

On 8 November 1787, Thurel was presented to the royal court at the Palace of Versailles. The 33-year-old king of France, Louis XVI, addressed the 88-year-old Army private in a respectful manner as "father", and asked whether Thurel would prefer to be awarded the Ordre Royal et Militaire de Saint-Louis ('Royal and Military Order of Saint Louis') or a third Médaillon Des Deux Épées medal, in recognition of the period from 1764 to 1788. This was a highly unusual request—not only because enlisted men and non-commissioned officers were not normally eligible to receive the Ordre Royal et Militaire de Saint-Louis, which was reserved for commissioned officers of the army or the navy—but also because Thurel still had four more months of military service to complete before being eligible for a third Médaillon Des Deux Épées medal. Thurel opted to receive a third Médaillon Des Deux Épées, on the condition that the king himself attach the medal to his uniform. Louis XVI granted Thurel his wish. The Comte d'Artois offered Thurel his sword, and the ladies of the court put a carriage at his disposal during his stay in the Paris area. The king also granted Thurel an annual pension of 300 livres. Very few men ever completed the 48 years of military service required to receive a second medal. Thurel was the only one to have received it thrice. In 1788 the officers of his regiment jointly paid for a portrait of Thurel to be painted by Antoine Vestier (see above).

On 26 October 1804, at the age of 105, Thurel became one of the first recipients of the newly established Ordre National de la Légion d'Honneur ('National Order of the Legion of Honor'), the highest decoration in France. Napoleon I also rewarded him with a pension of 1,200 francs. He was later appointed as the "oldest soldier of Europe". He remained healthy in body and spirit throughout his remarkably long life. He died in Tours on 10 March 1807, at the age of 107, after a brief illness.

== See also ==
- Last European veterans by war
- William Hiseland: a British supercentenarian soldier
- Johann Georg Sauer: a centenarian soldier from the army of the Dutch Republic
