= Angélique-Louise Verrier =

French artist (1762–1805)

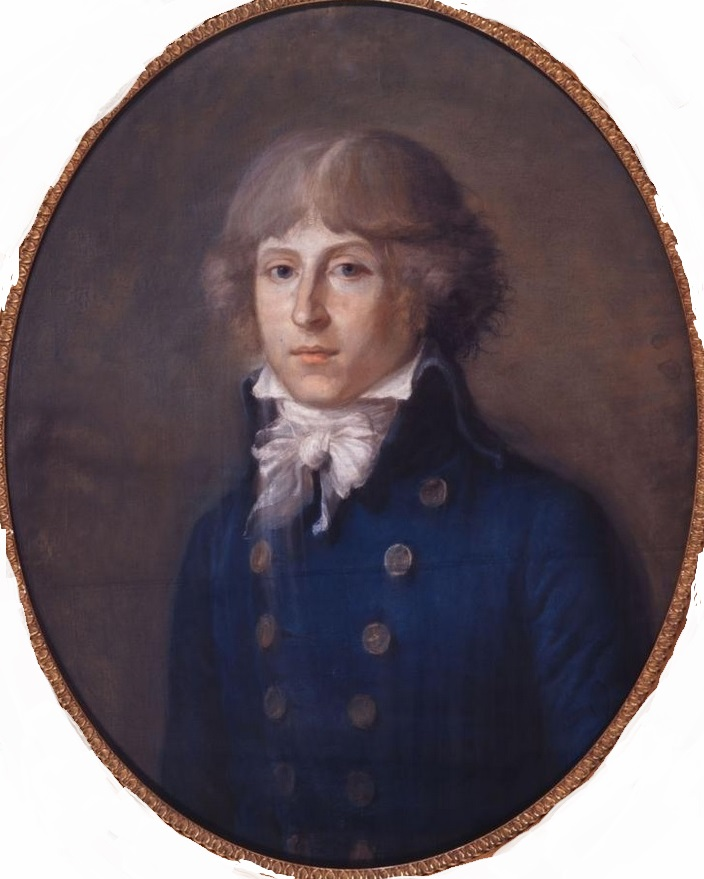
Portrait of Louis Antoine de Saint-Just attributed to Angélique-Louise Verrier

Angélique-Louise Verrier (1762–1805) was a French painter.

Born in the Parisian parish of Saint-Eustache, Verrier was a pupil of Adélaïde Labille-Guiard.

In 1785, she exhibited work in the salon de la Jeunesse, and in 1802 paintings by her hand appeared in the Paris Salon. She is recorded as a pastellist in a 1786 letter published in the Mercure de France.

By 1799, she was married to a Louis Maillard, and in that year their son Louis-Auguste-Jean-Baptiste was baptized at Saint-Germain l'Auxerrois. Maillard was dead by October 1801, when a posthumous inventory of his possessions was taken.

Verrier remains an obscure figure; long conflated with her contemporary Marie-Nicole Vestier. It was only in 2016 that information about her career was first published.
