= Orain =

- Commune
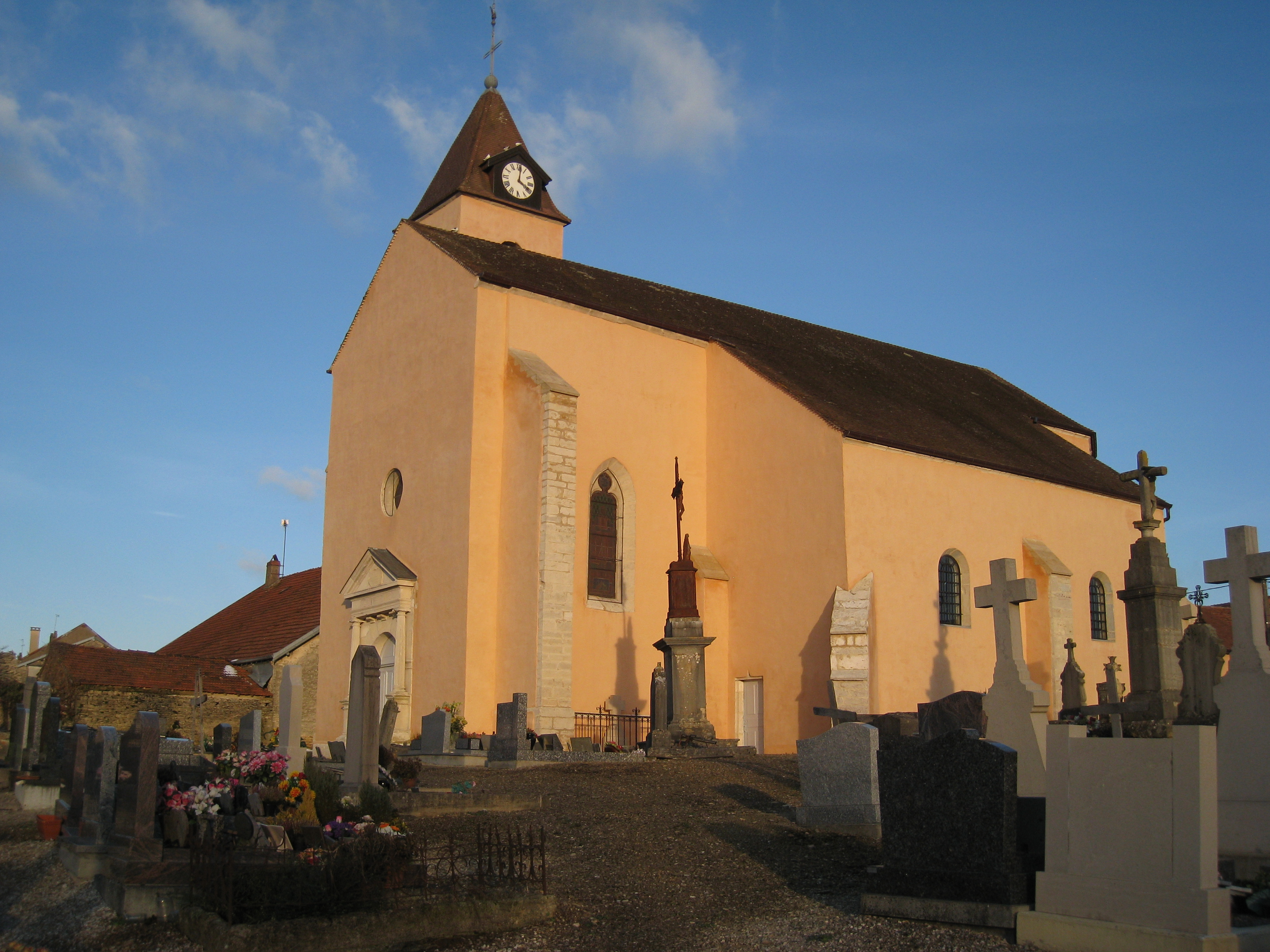
- The church in Orain
- Location of Orain
- Location within France Location within Bourgogne-Franche-Comté
- Coordinates: 47°36′33″N 5°25′45″E
- Country: France
- Region: Bourgogne-Franche-Comté
- Department: Côte-d'Or
- Arrondissement: Dijon
- Canton: Saint-Apollinaire

Government
  - Mayor (2020–2026): Bernard Gribelin
- Area^{1}: 13.67 km^{2} (5.28 sq mi)
- Elevation: 300 m (980 ft)
- Highest elevation: 327 m (1,073 ft)
- Lowest elevation: 242 m (794 ft)
- Population (2023): 90
  - Density: 6.6/km^{2} (17/sq mi)
- Time zone: UTC+01:00 (CET)
  - Summer (DST): UTC+02:00 (CEST)
- INSEE/Postal code: 21468 /21610
- ^{1} French Land Register data, which excludes lakes, ponds, glaciers > 1 km^{2} (0.386 sq mi or 247 acres) and river estuaries.

Orain (French pronunciation: [ɔʁɛ̃]) is a commune in the Côte-d'Or department in eastern France.

== Population ==
Historical population
Year	Pop.	±% p.a.
1968	151	—
1975	152	+0.09%
1982	122	−3.09%
1990	101	−2.33%
1999	109	+0.85%
2007	98	−1.32%
2012	105	+1.39%
2017	94	−2.19%
2023	90	−0.72%
Source: INSEE

== Personalities ==
Jean Thurel, the "oldest soldier of Europe", was born in Orain in 1698.

== See also ==
- Communes of the Côte-d'Or department
