= François Dumont (painter) =

French painter (1751–1831)

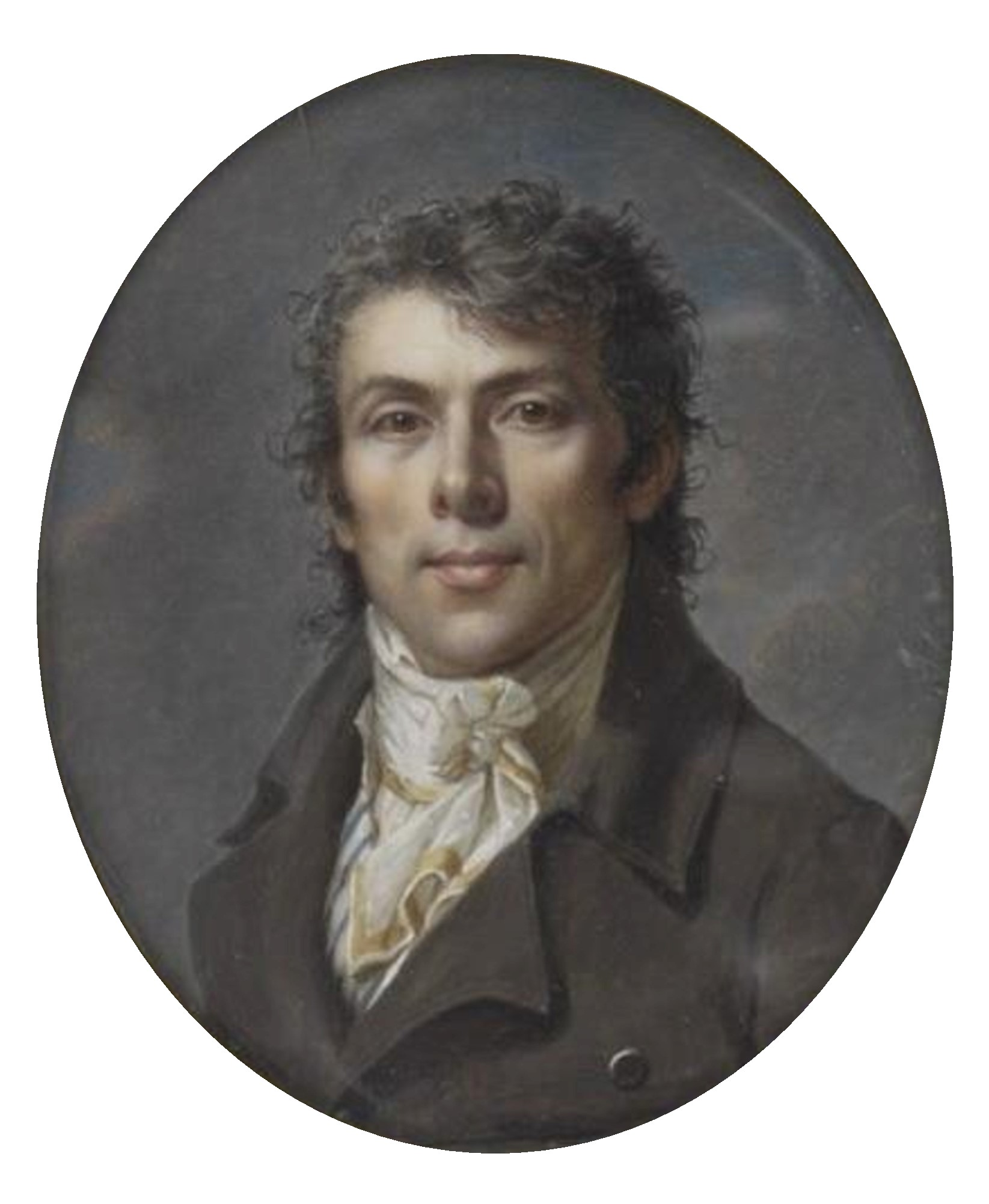
Self-portrait, 1791

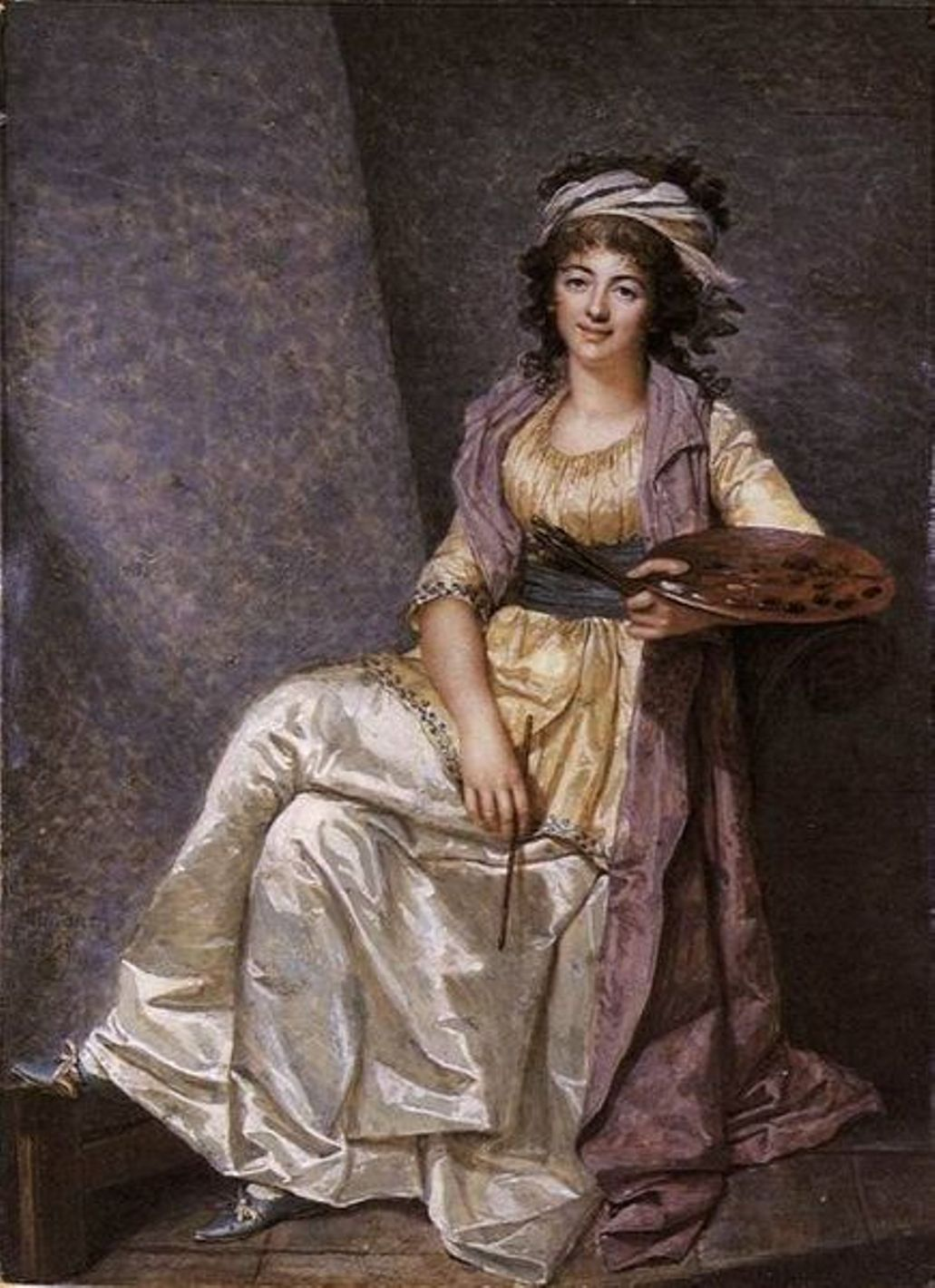
Ivory miniature of Marguerite Gérard by François Dumont, 1793

François Dumont (French pronunciation: [fʁɑ̃swa dymɔ̃]; 7 January 1751 – 27 August 1831) was a French painter of portrait miniatures.

Dumont was born at Lunéville (Meurthe), and was left an orphan when young, with five brothers and sisters to support. He was for a while a student under Jean Girardet, and then, on the advice of a Lunéville Academician, Madame Coster, set up a studio for himself. In 1784 he journeyed to Rome, returning after four years of careful study, and in 1788 was accepted as an Academician and granted an apartment in the Louvre. He married Marie-Nicole, the daughter of Antoine Vestier, a miniature painter. The couple had two sons, Aristide and Bias, both of whom became painters.

Dumont was one of the three greatest miniature painters of France, painting portraits of Louis XVI, Marie Antoinette, Louis XVIII, and Charles X, and of almost all the important persons of his day. His own portrait was engraved both by Francis Audouin and by Jean-Charles Tardieu.

He resided most of his life in Paris, where he died on 27 August 1831. A younger brother, Tony Dumont, was also a miniature painter, a pupil of his brother, a frequent exhibitor and the recipient of a medal from the Academy in 1810. Each artist signed with the surname only, and there is some controversy concerning the attribution to each artist of his own work. Tony was an expert violinist and delighted in painting portraits of persons who were playing upon the violin.

Many of Dumont's paintings came into the collection of J. P. Morgan, but others are in the Louvre, presented by the heir of Bias Dumont. The work of both painters is distinguished by breadth, precision and a charming scheme of coloring, and the unfinished works of the elder brother are amongst some of the most beautiful miniatures ever produced.

== Sources ==
- G. C. Williamson, The History of Portrait Miniatures, London, 1904.
- Catalogue of the Collection of Miniatures of Mr J. Pierpont Morgan, vol. iv.
