= Marie-Nicole Vestier =

French artist (1767–1846)

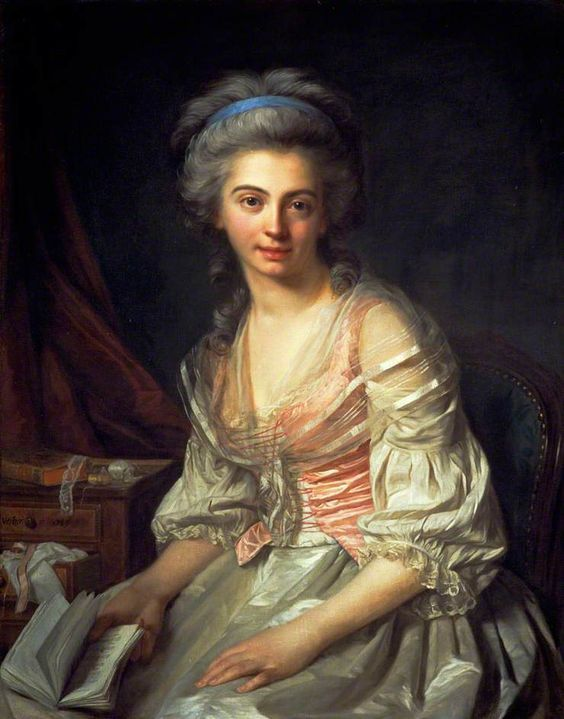
- Born: 1767; Paris
- Died: 1846 (aged 78–79); Paris
- Occupation: Painter
- Spouse(s): François Dumont
- Parent(s): Antoine Vestier

Marie-Nicole Vestier (1767–1846) was a French painter.

== Biography ==
A native of Paris, Vestier was the daughter of painter Antoine Vestier. Known as a portraitist, in 1789 she married miniature painter François Dumont. In 1785 a portrait of her by her father, in which she is depicted painting his portrait, appeared at the Paris Salon; this painting is currently held in a private collection in Buenos Aires. She was barred from presenting her own work at the Salon for several years, but in 1794 showed her self-portrait The Artist at Her Occupations. For many years it was assumed that Vestier was the artist who received much acclaim from critics for work which had been shown in 1785 at the place Dauphine; more recent research has shown this to be Angélique-Louise Verrier instead. Another portrait of Vestier by her father is held by the National Gallery of Scotland.

A painting of Marie-Nicole was acquired by the Musée de la Révolution française in 2017. This painting is his self-portrait presented at the Salon de Paris in 1793.
