= Antoine Vestier =

French painter (1740–1824)

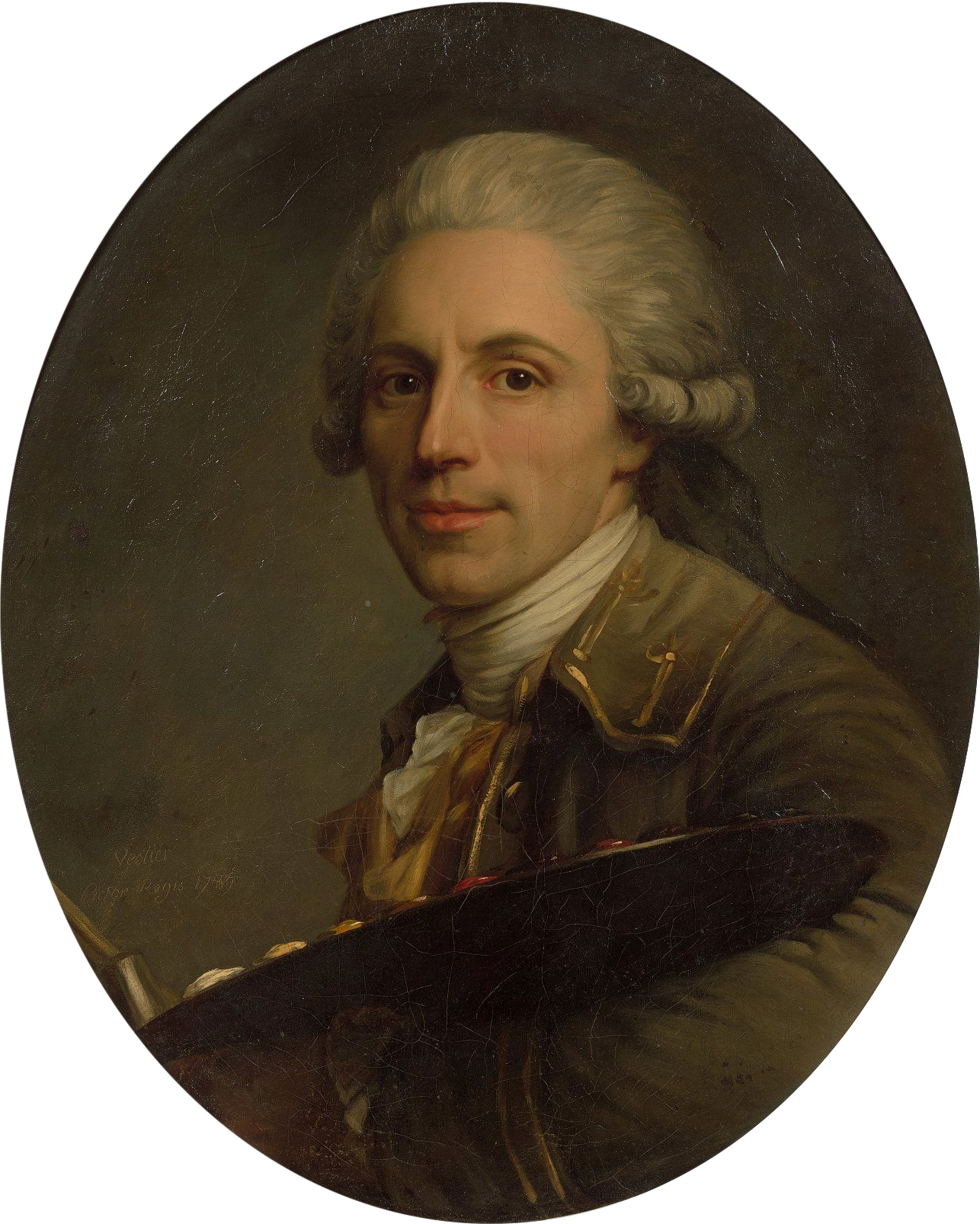
Self portrait, 1785

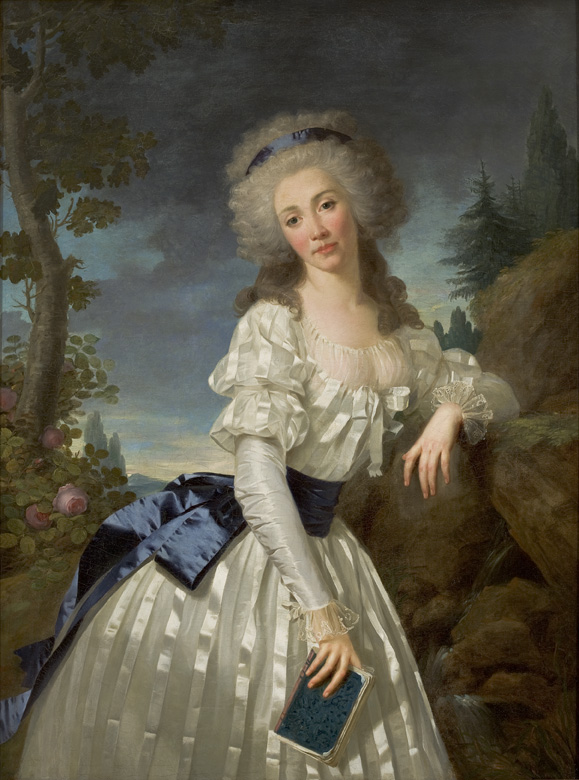
Portrait of a Lady with a Book, Next to a River, 1785, São Paulo Museum of Art.

Antoine Vestier (French pronunciation: [ɑ̃twan vɛstje]; 1740 – 24 December 1824) was a French miniaturist and painter of portraits, born at Avallon in Burgundy, who trained in the atelier of Jean-Baptiste Pierre. He showed his work at the Salon de la Correspondance, Paris, before being admitted (agréé) to the Académie Royale de Peinture et de Sculpture in 1785, when a portrait of the painter Gabriel François Doyen, was his morceau de réception.

Among his sitters was the royal cabinet-maker, Jean Henri Riesener (1786, Musée de Versailles).

Further portraits include

- The Chevalier de Latude, 1789 (Paris, musée Carnavalet)
- Nicolas-Guy Brenet, painter, 1786 (Paris, musée du Louvre)
- Jean Thurel, fusilier, 1788; this aged veteran wears three medals, witness to his seventy-two years of service (Tours, musée des Beaux-Arts)
- A Chevalier of Malta holding the portrait of the Bailli de Hautefeuille, commander of the Order, 1788 (Dijon, musée des beaux-arts).
- François-Joseph Gossec, unknown date.

Vestier was the father of portraitist Marie-Nicole Vestier, wife of miniaturist François Dumont.

== Gallery ==
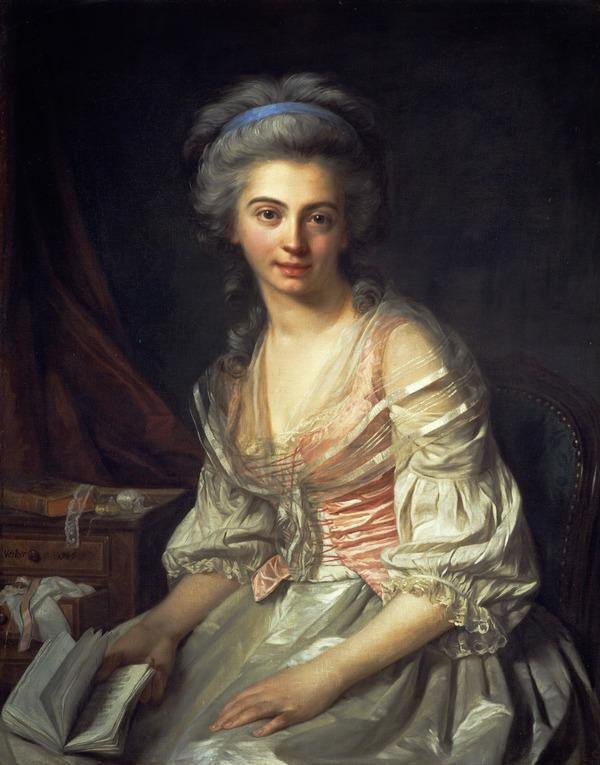
The Artist's Daughter, Marie-Nicole Vestier, 1783

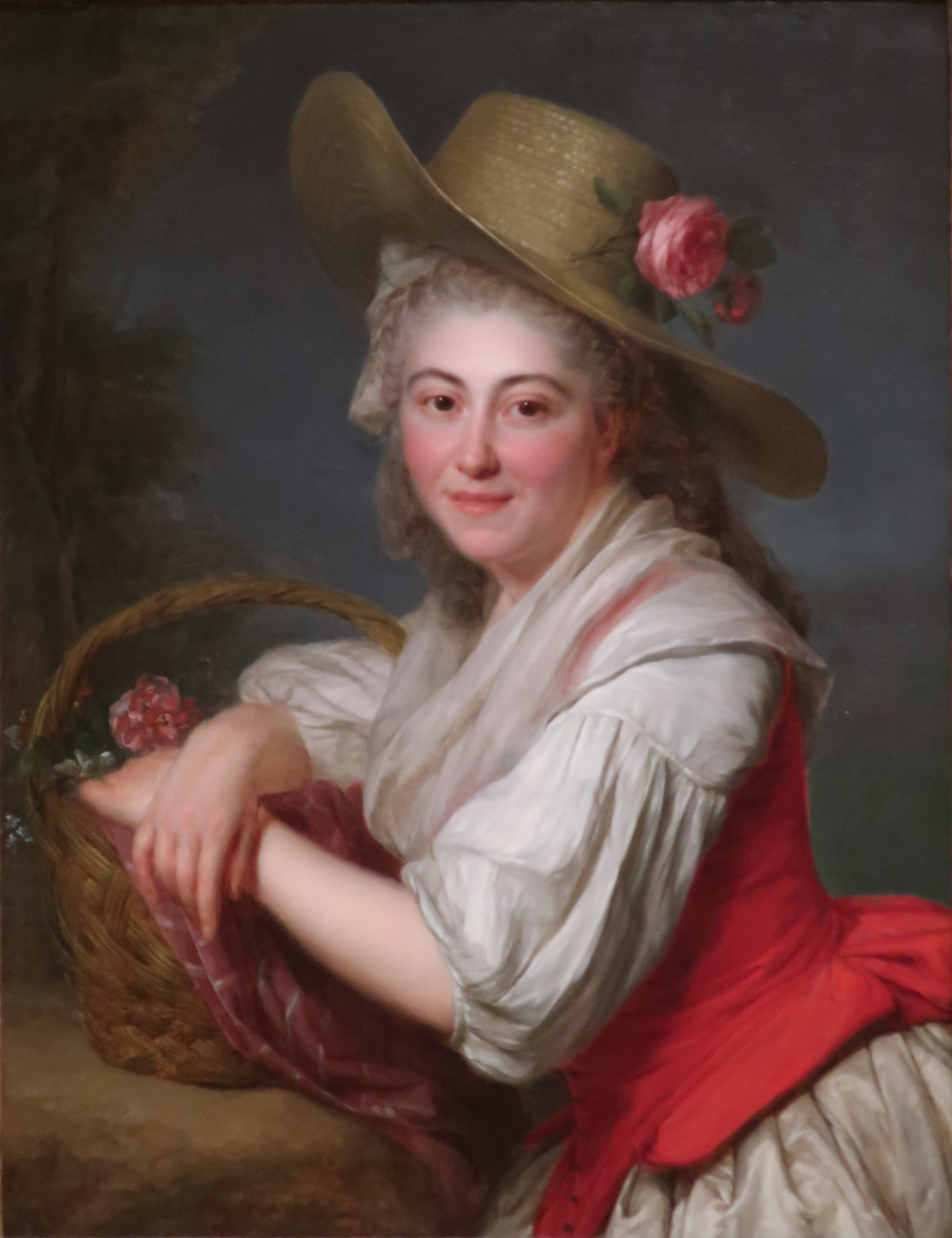
The Pretty Gardener, 1787

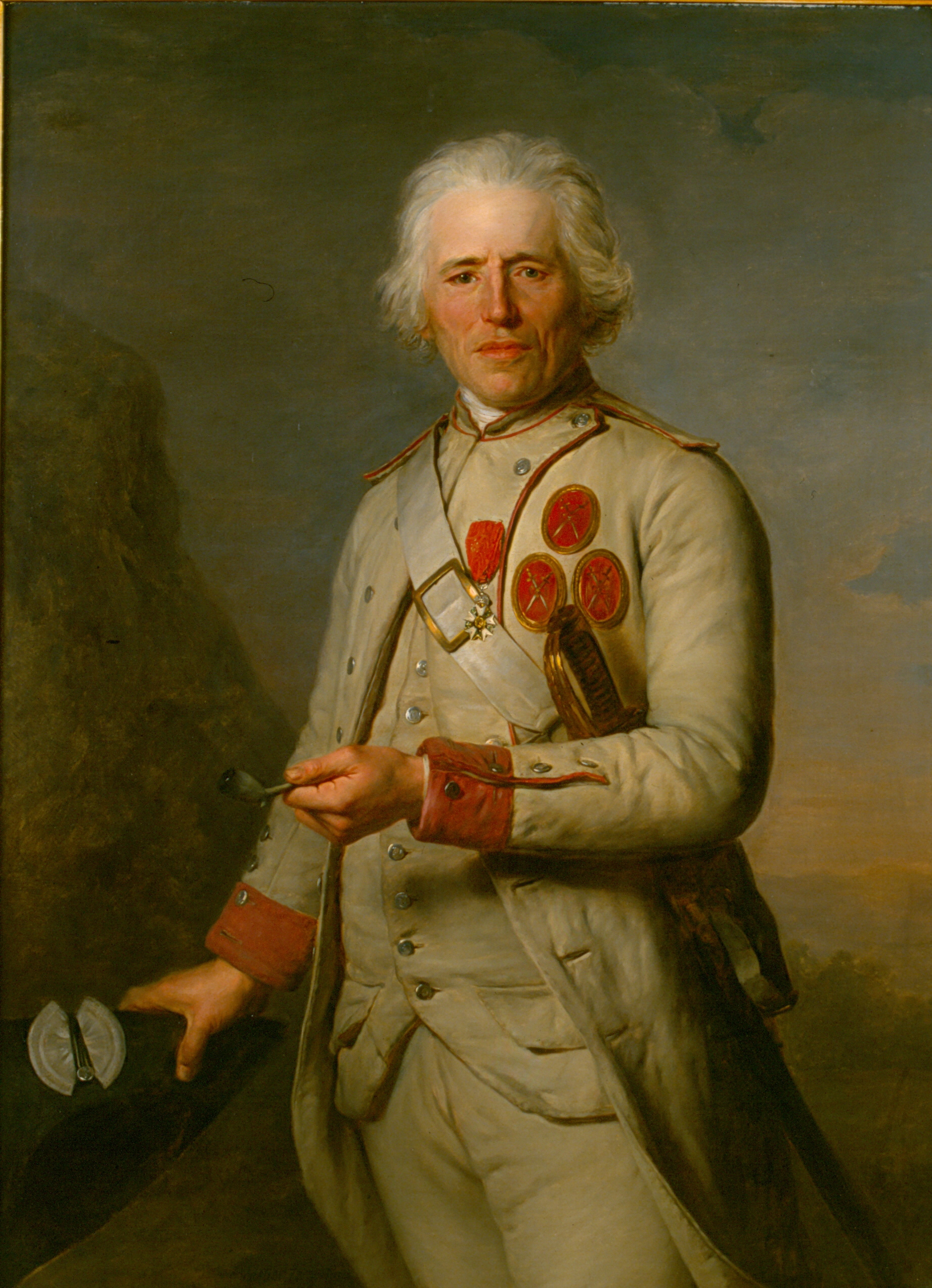
Jean Thurel, 1788

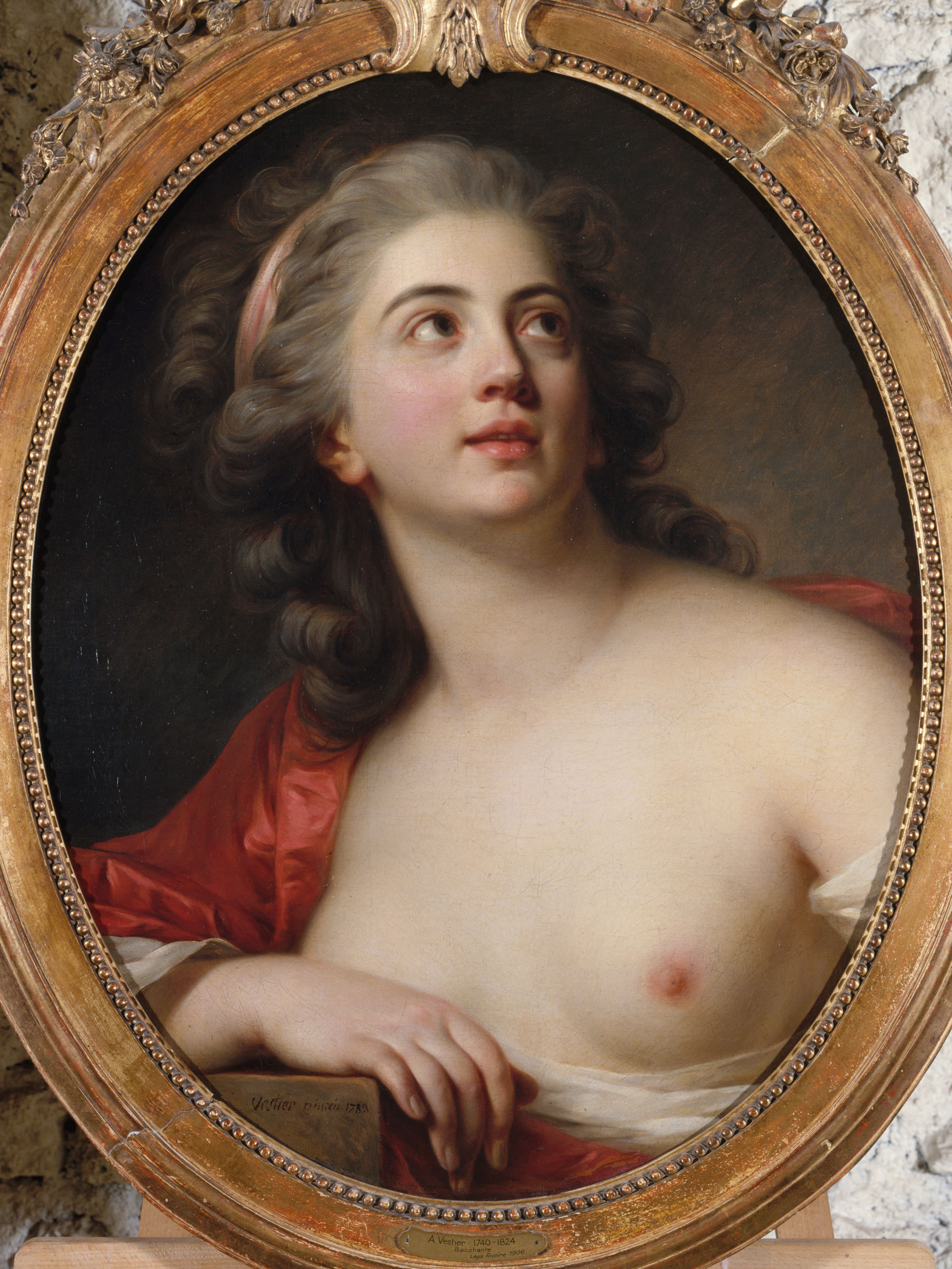
Head of a Bacchante, 1783

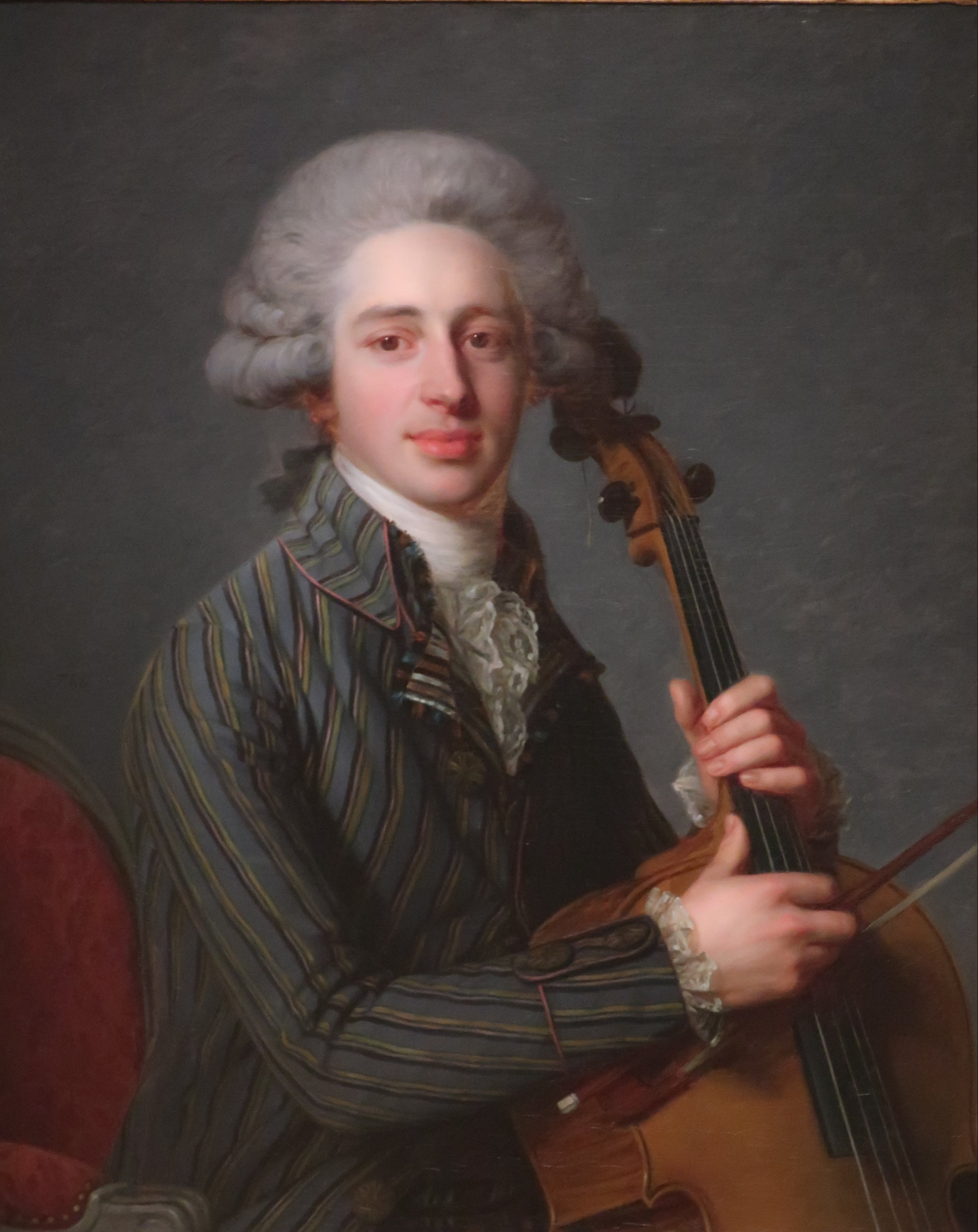
A Cellist, 1788
