= Wilma Kucharek =

American Lutheran bishop (born 1954)

The Reverend Wilma S. Kucharek
- Bishop
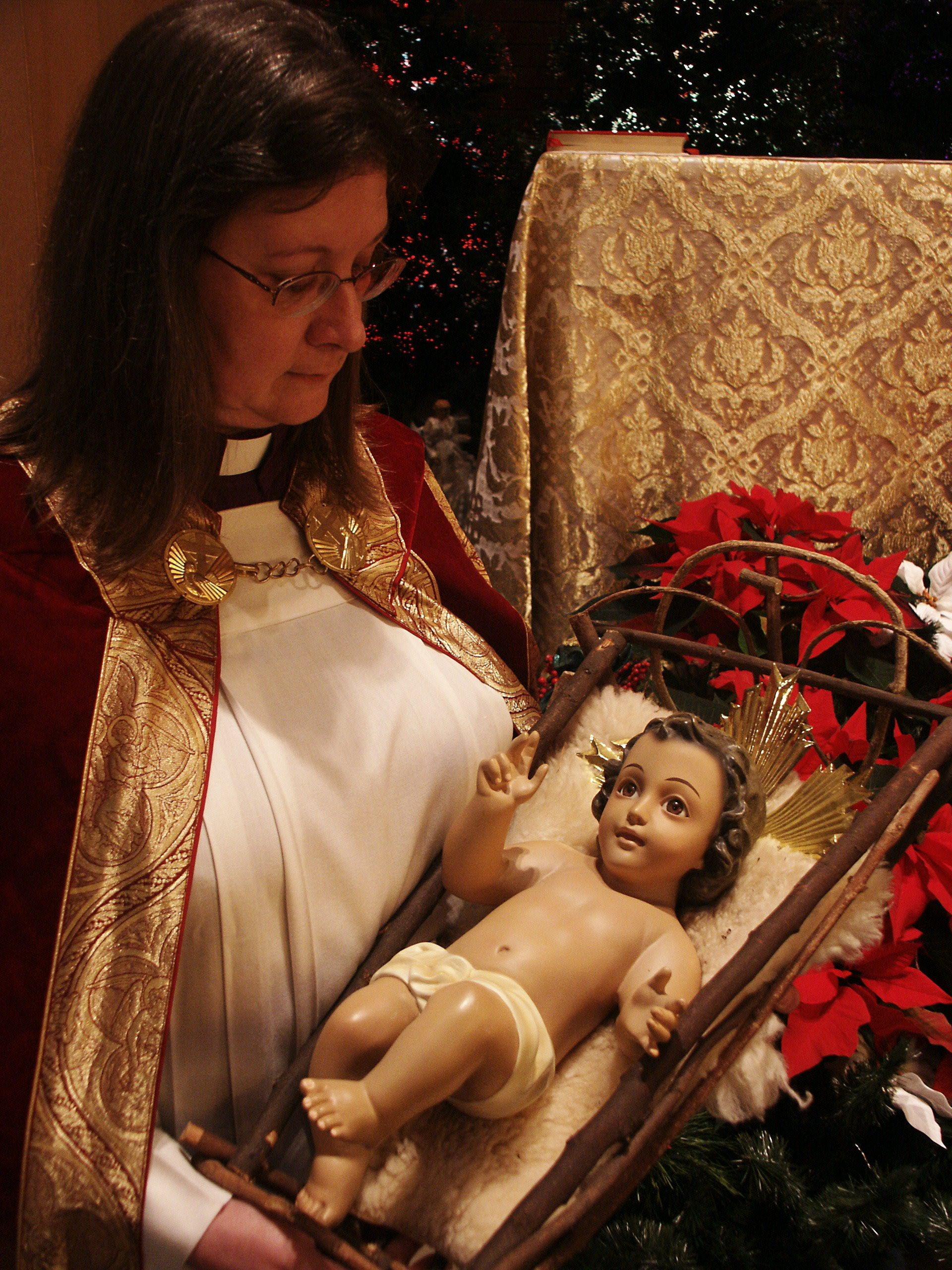
- Church: Evangelical Lutheran Church in America
- See: Slovak Zion Synod
- In office: June 22, 2002 - current

Orders
- Ordination: June 9, 1982

Personal details
- Born: September 19, 1954 (age 71) Johnson City, New York

Styles of Wilma Kucharek
- Reference style: The Right Reverend
- Spoken style: Bishop
- Religious style: Your Grace
- Posthumous style: not applicable

Wilma S. Kucharek (born September 19, 1954) is bishop of the Slovak Zion Synod.

Kucharek was born in Johnson City, New York and baptized in Slovak at Ascension Lutheran in Binghamton, New York. She graduated from Valparaiso University, Valparaiso, Indiana, and earned her M.Div. and STM degrees at the Lutheran Theological Seminary at Gettysburg, Pennsylvania.

Before her ordination as a pastor, (Sister) Kucharek was consecrated as a deaconess, serving parishes in Indiana and New York. She served as pastor of Holy Emmanuel Lutheran Church, Mahanoy City, Pennsylvania, from 1982 to 1986; St. John Lutheran Church, St. Clair, Pennsylvania, from 1982 to 1986; and St. John Lutheran Church, Nanticoke, Pennsylvania, from 1983 to 1986. In 1986, she accepted the call to serve as pastor of Holy Trinity Lutheran Church, Torrington, Connecticut.

Kucharek was elected to a 6-year term as bishop of the Slovak Zion Synod of the Evangelical Lutheran Church in America on June 22, 2002, succeeding Juan Čobrda, and re-elected to a second term on June 28, 2008 and a third term on November 17, 2014. Kucharek is the first woman of Slovak descent to become a bishop and, as of 2025, is the longest serving female bishop currently serving in the ELCA.

Kucharek served on the board of the ELCA's Division for Global Mission for 5 years, and as its secretary from 2001 to 2002 when she resigned to accept a call as bishop. In 2000 she was one of five women (and the only Lutheran) in a National Council of Churches Ecumenical Delegation of Women to North Korea. Among other ex officio offices Kucharek holds, she is on the board of trustees of United Lutheran Seminary and the board of trustees of Muhlenberg College.

Kucharek is married to Thomas J. Drobena. Together, they have been co-pastors at Holy Trinity Lutheran Church, Torrington, Connecticut, since 1986. She and Drobena are co-authors of the book "Heritage of the Slavs," and translators of "Evangelical Churches in Slovakia" as well as authoring numerous other works and articles.

Kucharek and Drobena are the parents of two sons: Thomas and Joshua. Their son, Thomas S. Drobena, serves as the pastor of Holy Trinity Lutheran Church, Stafford, Connecticut, and serves on the theology faculty of Assumption University, Worcester, Massachusetts.
