= Niles, Illinois =

Village in the United States

- Village
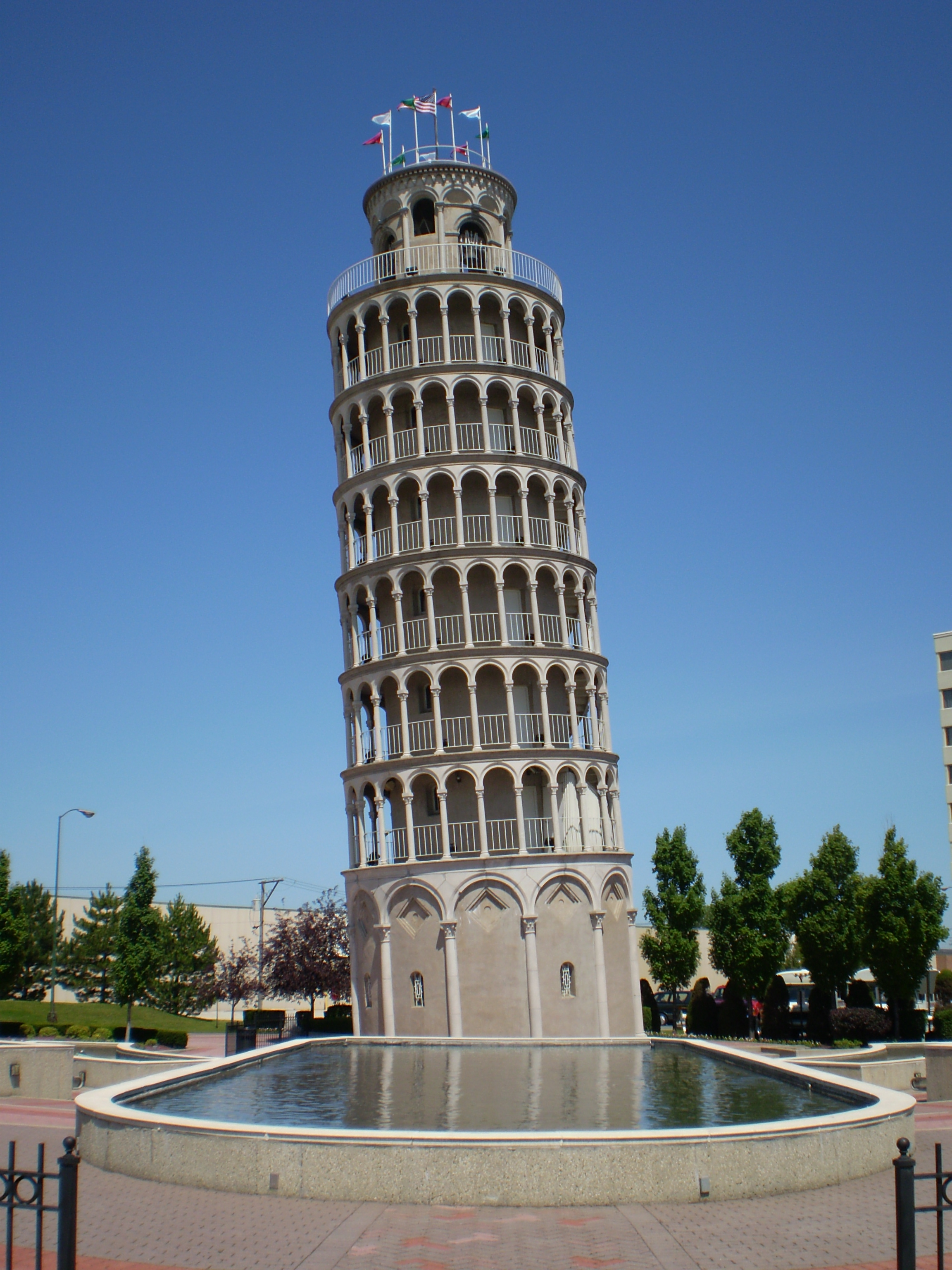
- Leaning Tower of Niles

- logo
- Motto: "It's Possible Here"
- Location of Niles in Cook County, Illinois

- Location of Niles in Greater Chicago Location of Niles in Illinois Location of Niles in the United States
- Coordinates: 42°1′40″N 87°48′36″W
- Country: United States
- State: Illinois
- County: Cook
- Townships: Maine, Niles
- Settled: 1832
- Incorporated: 1899

Government
  - Mayor: George D. Alpogianis

Area
  - Total: 5.85 sq mi (15.15 km^{2})
  - Land: 5.85 sq mi (15.15 km^{2})
  - Water: 0 sq mi (0.00 km^{2})
- Elevation: 646 ft (197 m)

Population (2020)
  - Total: 30,912
  - Density: 5,285.8/sq mi (2,040.87/km^{2})
- Time zone: UTC-6 (CST)
  - Summer (DST): UTC-5 (CDT)
- ZIP Code(s): 60714
- Area codes: 847, 224
- FIPS code: 17-53000
- Wikimedia Commons: Niles, Illinois
- Website: www.vniles.com

Niles is a village in Cook County, Illinois, United States, located in the townships of Maine and Niles, directly neighboring Chicago's far northwest border. Per the 2020 census, the population was 30,912. The current mayor of Niles is George Alpogianis.

== History ==
Joseph Curtis settled in what became Niles in 1827, and John Dewes followed in 1831. The settlement was originally called "Dutchman's Point", referring to German immigrants who followed, including John Plank of Hesse-Darmstadt (who sold whiskey to passing travelers and remaining Native Americans) and the Ebinger brothers of Stuttgart, as well as John Schadiger, Julius Perren, John-Jackson Ruland (d. 1880) and Revolutionary war soldier John Ketchum.

Many people of Native American ancestry lived in the area; Chief Blackhawk reportedly often smoked a peace pipe with Christian Ebinger. Article 4 of the Second Treaty of Prairie du Chien, signed on July 29, 1829, between the United States government and several chiefs of the Chippewa, Ottawa, and Potawatamie left particular tracts of land to individuals of mixed-Native American ancestry. Among them were Billy Caldwell, Victoria Pothier, and Jane Miranda. Land titled to these individuals eventually established part of the border of Niles. During the 1832 Black Hawk War, one band of Native Americans may have reached Billy Caldwell's property as part of an attempt to reclaim land lost to the United States. Hostilities ended in 1833, and most Native Americans immediately left, moving west of the Mississippi River

=== Niles and Niles Township founding ===
The Ebingers settled near Milwaukee and Touhy Avenues in the early 1830s. John Ebinger had been the head gardener for King William in Württemberg, Germany, but moved to the United States (initially Ann Arbor, Michigan) when he was 62. His eldest son Frederick had traveled to Chicago and worked on the pier or harbor by 1832, and was soon joined by his brother John Jr. and their wives, as well as John Plank. John Ebinger and his youngest son Christian (at 21 newly married to orphaned Barbara Reuhle of Stuttgart in 1834; both of whom walked the route to enable their elders to ride) packed and traveled to join them, but found Chicago too swampy to farm. After their horse stepped on a rattlesnake and died shortly after crossing the North Branch of the Chicago River on an Indian trail leading towards Milwaukee, the Ebingers built a cabin at Milwaukee and Harlem Avenues, and laid claim to 80 acres (0.32 km^{2}) of land. The older Ebinger brothers (one of whom married the sister of Fort Dearborn's commanders' wife) soon joined them, as did the Planks. John Plank soon sold his house to Mr. Phillips, who opened a store and became the area's first postmaster. Christian Ebinger or his son of the same name (born 1835 and the first white child born in the area, d. 1879), became the first minister to be ordained in their German Evangelical Association, and served as the Village Collector, Township Assessor and Overseer of the Poor (from 1852 to 1865) and Highway Commissioner, as well as left seven surviving children.

There is no clear indication of the origin of the name "Niles." A Chicago Tribune article from 1929 opined that the name referred to the Niles Weekly Register, a popular newspaper published in the 1820s and 1830s by fervently nationalist (and abolitionist) Quaker Hezekiah Niles out of Baltimore, Maryland. His son William Ogden Niles published the newspaper from Washington, D.C. until it ceased publication in 1849; the Odgen family had longstanding connections with the Chicago area. Another belief is that the name "Niles" was named after Niles Construction which did much of the building early during the city's founding. Alternatively, soldiers from Niles, Michigan reinforced Fort Dearborn during the Black Hawk War, and afterward may have sent word back about the rich farmland to the north. Three early families of settlers came from Niles, Michigan with troops or had relatives at Fort Dearborn. An early history of Cook County, Illinois reported that every two weeks a half-breed Indian traveled to Niles, Michigan for mail. By 1834 a twice-weekly stage connected Chicago and Niles. The North Branch Hotel was built in 1837 and the White House tavern in 1847. By 1839, a traveling German preacher visited Dutchman's Point every two or three weeks.

Niles Township was organized in a meeting at the North Branch Hotel on April 2, 1850, a year after John Odell donated land at Milwaukee and Harlem Avenues to build a second school (constructed by John Ketchem, who was active in the Methodist church) and four years after Joseph Curtis returned to England. Blacksmith Benjamin Lupton had returned to England to marry, then returned with his bride to Dutchman's Point in 1840, and remained the settlement's blacksmith for the next two decades. Residents later said the township name was chosen before the public meeting. The following year, the township adopted an ordinance to regulate livestock running amok. By 1858, Henry Harms had a store on Harms Avenue in Niles Center, the township's other population center, which was later renamed Skokie. By 1890, that area had six saloons, two blacksmith shops and three churches.

=== Post–World War II growth ===
Along with neighboring Skokie and several other suburbs, Niles is partly within Niles Township, from which it draws its name. The other part of Niles is in Maine Township. The village of Niles was formally incorporated by the state of Illinois on August 24, 1899. The village had a population of 500 people at that time. Niles, like neighboring communities Skokie, Park Ridge and Glenview, grew significantly after veterans of World War II and the Korean War returned home to the Chicago area and established families in the streetcar suburbs. In 1950, Niles had only 3,500 people, but as former farms and nurseries redeveloped into housing, the population tripled in the next five years, then nearly doubled, reaching 18,863 people in 1962. Unlike Park Ridge, Skokie and Glenview, Niles did not have its own commuter rail stop. Residents who did not use their own automobiles to reach their jobs could connect by bus to the Chicago Transit Authority stops at Jefferson Park or the Skokie Swift, or with the Chicago and Northwestern Commuter rail line (incorporated into Metra) in Park Ridge or Glenview or at intervening stops such as Norwood Park and Edison Park (once part of Niles Township until annexed by Chicago). Niles became the first community in Illinois, and one of the first in the United States to establish free ambulance service, in 1946. Several decades later, it instituted a free bus service to connect residents with local shops, government offices and transit options (shown).

In 1964, under then-new mayor Nicholas B. Blase, Niles was named an "All America City". Niles grew by selectively annexing nearby unincorporated areas of Cook County, the most important for tax revenue purposes being the area that became the Golf Mill Shopping Center. Its population peaked in 1970 at 31,432 people. Blase, the son of Greek immigrants raised in Chicago's Bridgeport neighborhood and a law and business graduate of University of Notre Dame, had moved to Niles in 1959 and initially worked as a claims adjuster for Allstate Insurance Company. He would become Niles' longest-serving mayor, but resigned in a scandal in 2008 which led to his federal criminal conviction for steering insurance business to cronies. Ironically, Blase was first elected in 1961, when he upset Frank Stankowicz, a former motorcycle cop who had won election first as village clerk, then had won election and re-election as mayor for two decades before passing the gavel to the young upstart. Blase's "New Era Party" ran a door-to-door campaign against corruption (police turning a blind eye to local gambling houses, and prostitution flourishing near the Chicago border) and builder favoritism. During his nearly five decades as mayor, Blase established a free bus service, a new village hall, a senior and fitness center, and a new police station, as well as jobs for nearly 500 municipal employees. Blase resigned in 2008 amid federal charges that he participated in an insurance kickback scheme. Several months later he pleaded guilty to mail fraud and tax evasion, and admitted that he had pressured local businesses to buy insurance from a friend's agency in return for a share of the commissions, receiving more than $420,000 over a period of more than 30 years. In 2010 Blase, then 81 years old, was sentenced to a year and a day in prison. After serving his term – first in federal prison, then in a halfway house, and then in home confinement – he returned to live in Niles. In 2011, his name was removed from the plaza outside the village hall and post office. Blase died in 2019.

== Geography ==
Niles is located at 42°1′40″N 87°48′36″W (42.0277127, -87.8100990). According to the 2021 census gazetteer files, Niles has a total area of 5.85 square miles (15.15 km^{2}), all land.

Niles is adjacent to Chicago to the south, Skokie to the east, Morton Grove to the northeast, Glenview to the north, and Park Ridge and unincorporated Cook County (and portions of Chicago) to the west. The town is centered along Milwaukee Avenue which forms a main artery diagonally through the town on a northwest–southeast bearing.

The North Branch of the Chicago River flows through the eastern part of the town roughly in a north–south direction.

== Demographics ==
Historical population
Census	Pop.	Note	%±
1880	289		—
1900	514		—
1910	569		10.7%
1920	1,258		121.1%
1930	2,135		69.7%
1940	2,168		1.5%
1950	3,587		65.5%
1960	20,393		468.5%
1970	31,432		54.1%
1980	30,363		−3.4%
1990	28,284		−6.8%
2000	30,068		6.3%
2010	29,803		−0.9%
2020	30,912		3.7%
U.S. Decennial Census; 2010 2020

=== Racial and ethnic composition ===
Niles village, Illinois – Racial and ethnic composition Note: the US Census treats Hispanic/Latino as an ethnic category. This table excludes Latinos from the racial categories and assigns them to a separate category. Hispanics/Latinos may be of any race.
Race / Ethnicity (NH = Non-Hispanic)	Pop 2000	Pop 2010	Pop 2020	% 2000	% 2010	% 2020
White alone (NH)	24,133	21,332	20,200	80.26%	71.58%	65.35%
Black or African American alone (NH)	123	388	500	0.41%	1.30%	1.62%
Native American or Alaska Native alone (NH)	8	20	12	0.03%	0.07%	0.04%
Asian alone (NH)	3,792	4,950	6,040	12.61%	16.61%	19.54%
Pacific Islander alone (NH)	3	1	2	0.01%	0.00%	0.01%
Other race alone (NH)	15	43	74	0.15%	0.14%	0.24%
Mixed race or Multiracial (NH)	482	487	637	1.60%	1.63%	2.06%
Hispanic or Latino (any race)	1,512	2,582	3,447	5.03%	8.66%	11.15%
Total	30,038	29,803	30,912	100.00%	100.00%	100.00%

=== 2020 census ===
As of the 2020 census, Niles had a population of 30,912, with 11,961 households and 7,180 families residing in the village. The median age was 48.7 years; 16.7% of residents were under the age of 18 and 27.1% were 65 years of age or older. For every 100 females there were 90.0 males, and for every 100 females age 18 and over there were 87.4 males.

100.0% of residents lived in urban areas, while 0.0% lived in rural areas.

Of the 11,961 households, 25.0% had children under the age of 18 living in them. Of all households, 50.0% were married-couple households, 17.4% were households with a male householder and no spouse or partner present, and 29.5% were households with a female householder and no spouse or partner present. About 31.1% of all households were made up of individuals, and 18.8% had someone living alone who was 65 years of age or older.

There were 12,590 housing units, of which 5.0% were vacant. The homeowner vacancy rate was 1.2% and the rental vacancy rate was 6.4%.

=== Income and poverty ===
The median income for a household in the village was $63,490, and the median income for a family was $85,270. Males had a median income of $43,231 versus $35,299 for females. The per capita income for the village was $33,692. About 6.9% of families and 9.2% of the population were below the poverty line, including 9.8% of those under age 18 and 11.8% of those age 65 or over.

=== Assyrian community ===
Niles has a large ethnic Assyrian population. Per the 2023 American Community Survey five-year estimates, the Assyrian American population was 1,113.

== Economy ==
Companies based in Niles include Shure, Bradford Exchange, Hammacher Schlemmer, and MFRI.

According to the Village's 2019 Comprehensive Annual Financial Report, the top employers in the city are:

#	Employer	# of Employees
1	Woodward, Inc.	1,000
2	Shure (HQ)	680
3	Bradford Exchange (HQ)	600
4	Coca-Cola Bottling Company	500
5	Village of Niles	425
6	Specialty Print Communications	250
7	Talk-A-Phone, LLC	250
8	Fort Dearborn Company	210
9	GlobalTranz Enterprises, Inc.	200
10	Golf Mill Motor Sales	181

== Culture ==
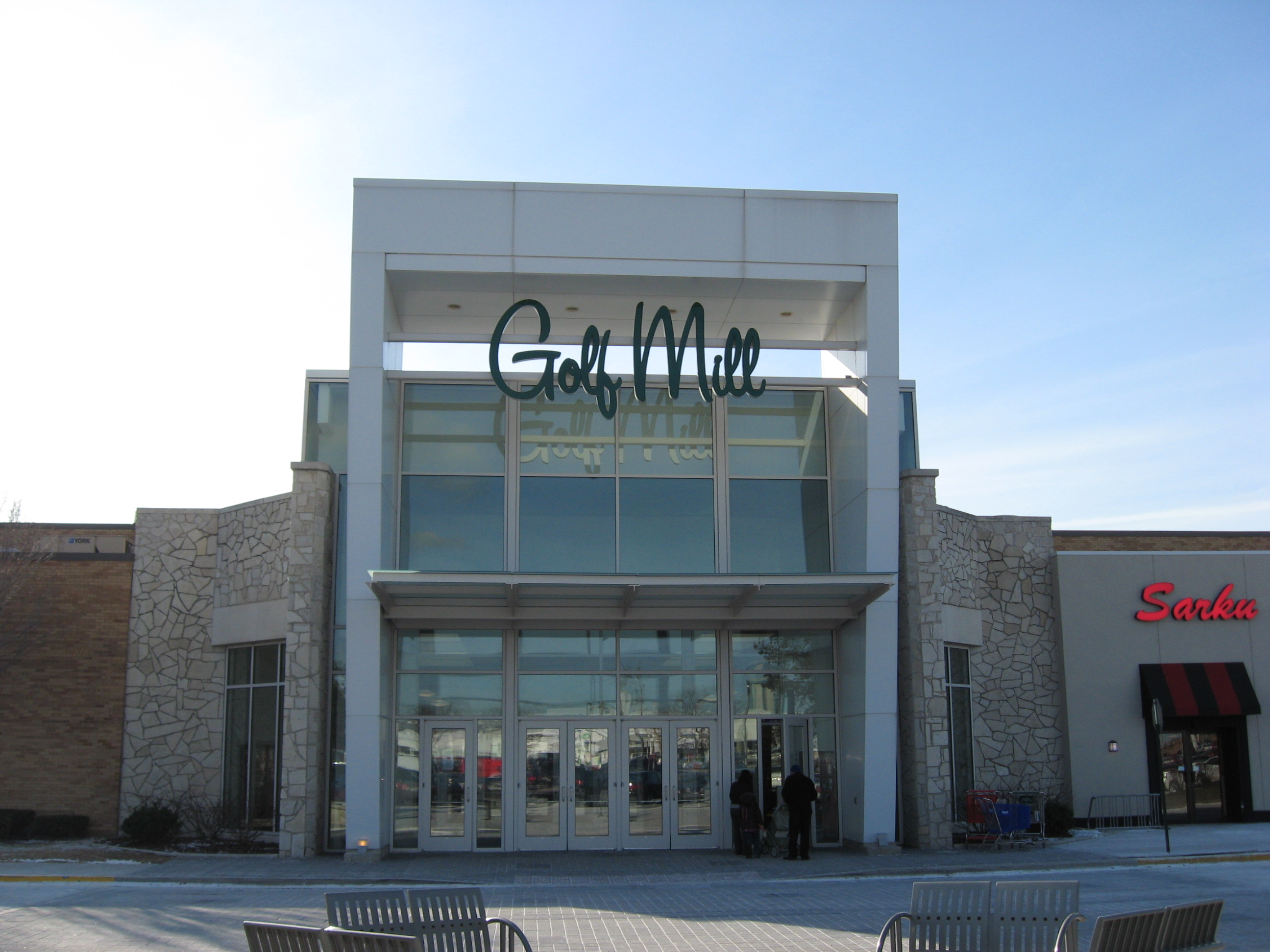
Golf Mill Shopping Center

A notable landmark and point of pride among Niles' residents is the Leaning Tower of Niles, a smaller-scale replica of the Leaning Tower of Pisa. This landmark is seen in the opening Chicago-area montage of the film Wayne's World. The Niles Leaning Tower has also been featured in many national magazines, including Oprah's "O" Magazine in 2014. It is located next to the local YMCA (which is appropriately called the "Leaning Tower YMCA"). Several concerts covering a variety of musical forms are held here throughout the summer.

Another notable landmark is the Tam O'Shanter Golf Course, which is currently under the ownership of the Niles Park District. From 1941 to 1957, the course was host to the All American Open on the PGA Tour. In 1964 and 1965, the course hosted the Western Open.

St. Adalbert Cemetery, the largest in the Archdiocese of Chicago in terms of burials, is the resting place of German immigrant Fredrak Fraske (1872–1973), who was the last surviving veteran of the "Indian Wars". St. Adalbert's is also the location of the Halas Family mausoleum, and is the final resting place of George Halas, former head coach of the Chicago Bears. St. John Brebeuf Catholic Church was the first Catholic parish in Niles.

Golf Mill Shopping Center opened in 1960. The world headquarters of the Bradford Group, a major collectibles company, is located on Milwaukee Avenue.

== Government ==
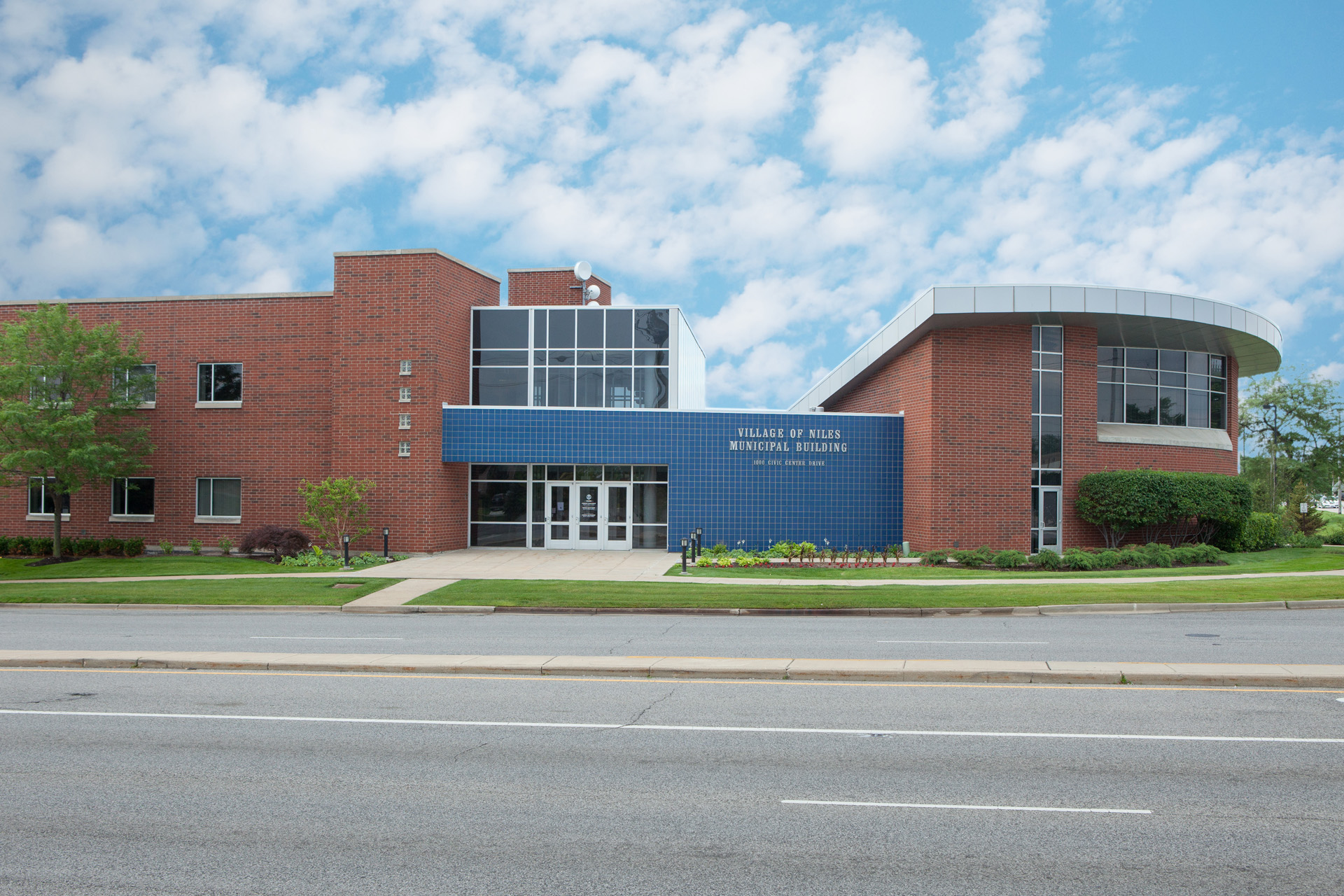
Niles Village Hall

The Mayor of Niles is George D. Alpogianis, elected to the office in 2021 after previously serving as a trustee since 2013. Current trustees of the Village are Morgan Dubiel, John C. Jekot, Danette O'Donovan Matyas, Craig Niedermaier, Dean Strzelecki, and Marryann Warda.

The Village of Niles operates several human services departments. These include Niles Family Services (counseling and social services), the Niles Senior Center, the Niles Teen Center and the Niles Family Fitness Center.

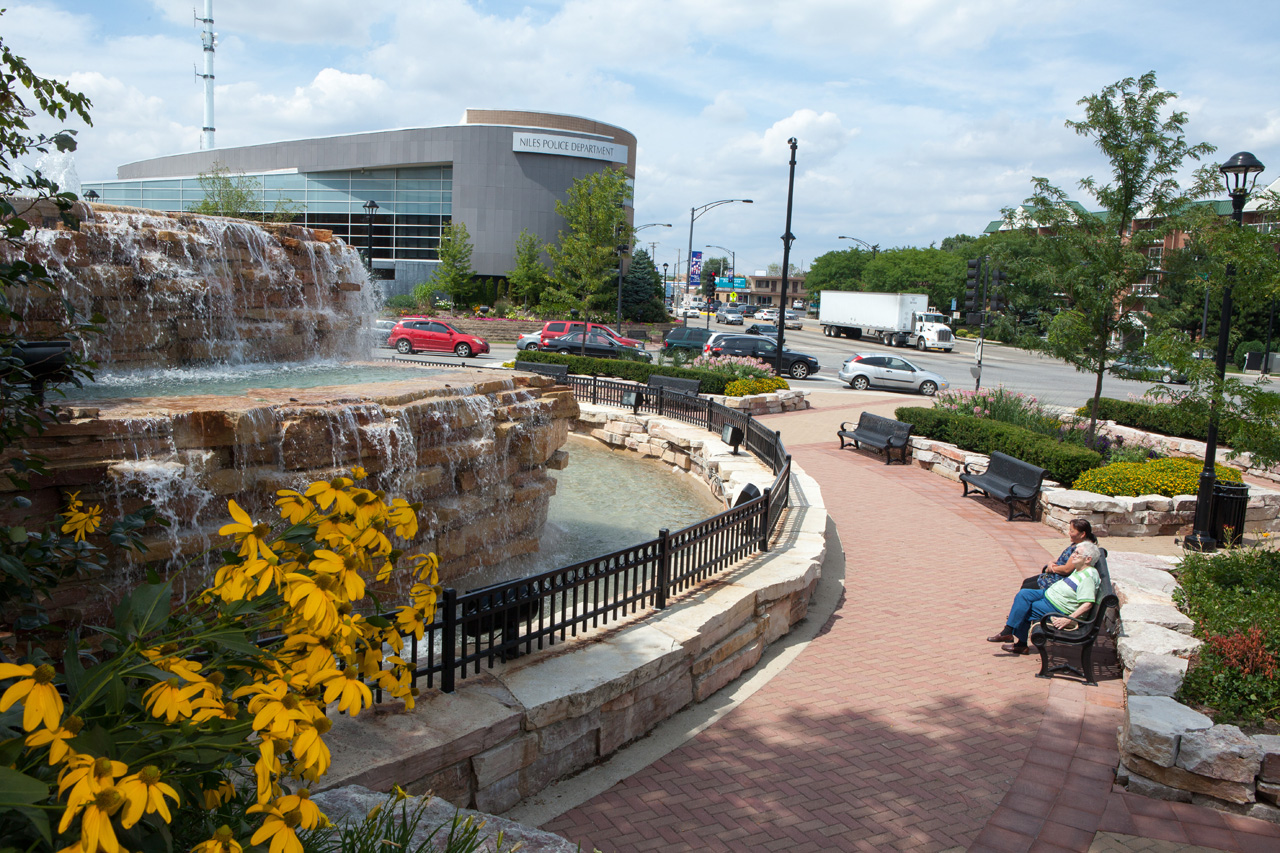
Niles Police Department

The Niles Police Department provides 24-hour-a-day service and protection to village residents.

The Niles Fire Department began providing service on February 19, 1912. In 1946, the Village began providing free ambulance services, predating all other Illinois communities. Located in Fire Station 2 is the historic "Blue Boy," which is the first fire wagon in Niles. It was used as a hand-drawn unit from 1899 to 1909, and converted to horse-drawn service in 1910.

== Education ==
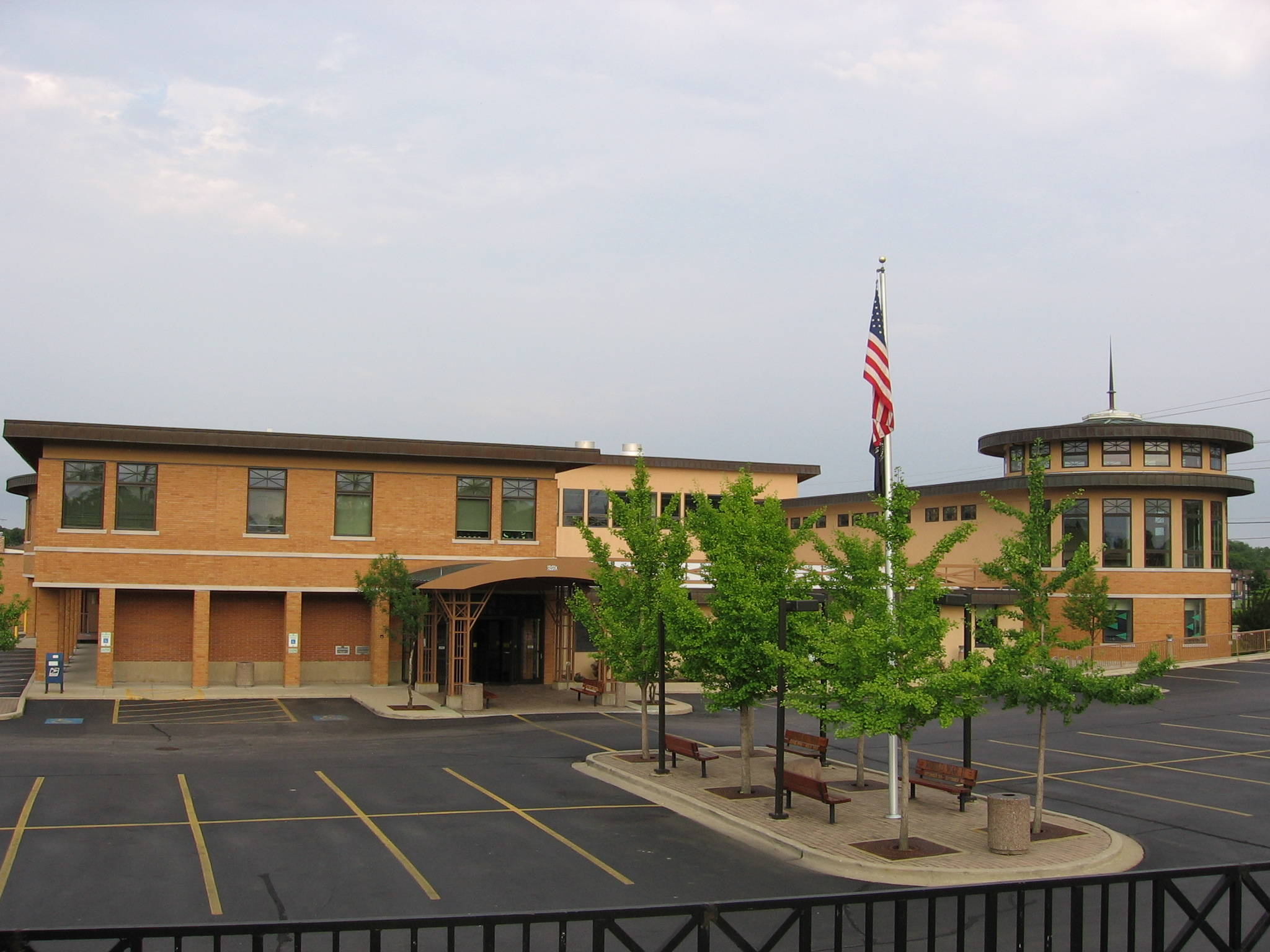
The Niles Public Library on Waukegan and Oakton. The space in the parking lot is a memorial to military veterans.

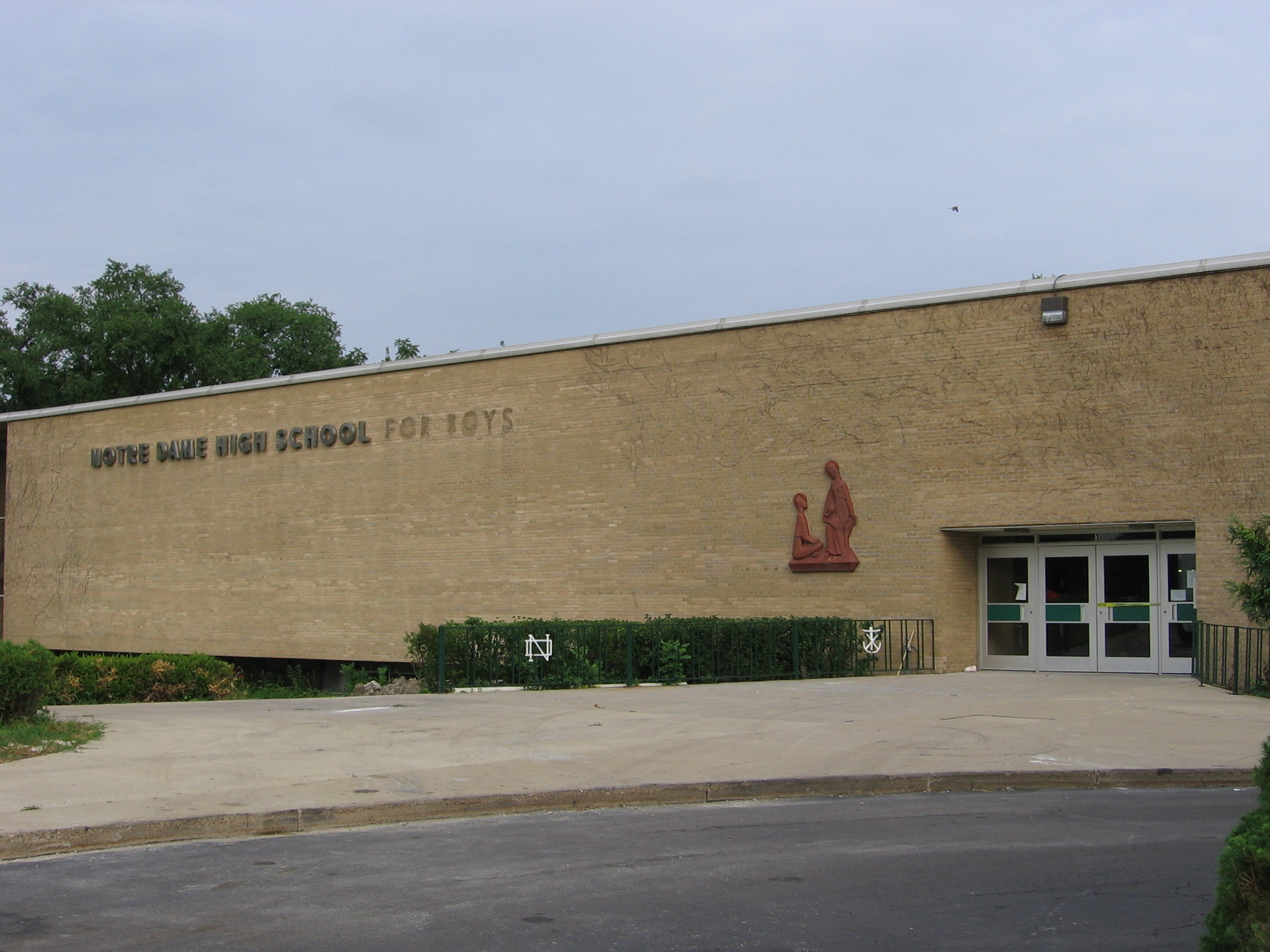
Notre Dame High School is located on Dempster Street.

Elementary school districts:

- East Maine School District 63
- Park Ridge-Niles School District 64
- Golf School District 67
- Niles Elementary School District 71
- Fairview School District 72
- The Niles Township District for Special Education 807 serves some residents in these districts.

High school districts:

- Maine Township High School District 207

• Maine East High School
• Maine South High School

- Niles Township Community High School District 219

• Niles North High School
• Niles West High School

Community College district:

- Oakton Community College

Catholic schools: (Roman Catholic Archdiocese of Chicago)

- St. John Brebeuf School is a Catholic parish school serving students from pre-school through 8th grade.
- Northridge Preparatory School is a Catholic independent private high school.
- Notre Dame College Prep is a Catholic high school sponsored by the Brothers of Holy Cross.

Baptist schools:

- Logos Christian Academy is a Romania-Baptist school.

Until 1998 the Chicago Futabakai Japanese School was located in Niles. In 1998 it moved to Arlington Heights.

== Transportation ==
=== Niles Free Bus ===
The Niles Free Bus is a courtesy bus system, which operates within the Village of Niles at no charge to riders. The Free Bus runs continually from 6:30 a.m. to 5:00 p.m. on weekdays, and from 9:30 a.m. to 4:30 p.m. on weekends. The buses stop at all major shopping centers, public facilities, and within a short distance of every residence.

=== Pace ===
Pace provides bus service on multiple routes in the village connecting Niles to destinations across the region. Both the Pace Pulse Milwaukee Line and Pulse Dempster Line serve the village.

=== Major highways ===
Major highways in Niles include:

US Highways
US 14

Illinois Highways
Route 21
Route 43
Route 58

== Notable people ==
- Paul Cienniwa, harpsichordist, organist, and choral conductor
- Rev. Juan Čobrda, bishop of the Lutheran church
- Jill Erickson, bank robber
- Art Frantz, umpire in Major League Baseball
- Jim Les, National Basketball Association player and college basketball head coach
- Pete Sykaras, Olympic baseball player
- Agnes Zawadzki, figure skater and two-time World Junior medalist
- Michael Janis, award winning glass artist

== Sister cities ==
Niles has four sister cities as of 2008:

- Pisa, Italy (since 1991)
- Nafplion, Greece (since 1994)
- (Republic of Ireland) Leixlip, Ireland (since 2000)
- Limanowa, Poland (since 2005)

== See also ==
- List of towns and villages in Illinois
