= Will Rey =

American basketball coach (born 1953)

Biographical details
- Born: May 21, 1953 (age 73); Havana, Cuba
- Education: Northeastern Illinois (B.S.); Concordia University Chicago (M.A.)

Coaching career (HC unless noted)
- 1977–1980: Gordon Technical HS (asst.)
- 1980–1982: Crete-Monee HS
- 1982–1985: Fenwick HS (IL)
- 1985–1989: Evansville (asst.)
- 1989–1994: Loyola–Chicago
- 1994–1997: Saint Mary's (MN)
- 1997–2003: Wright State (asst.)
- 2003–2004: Wilmington (OH)
- 2004–present: Northridge Prep

Head coaching record
- Overall: 62–177 (.259) (college); 501–269 (.651) (high school)

Will Rey (born May 21, 1953) is an American basketball coach who is currently the head coach and athletic director at Northridge Preparatory School in Illinois. A longtime Hall-of-Fame high school basketball coach in Illinois, he was also a head coach at Division I Loyola University Chicago and Division III schools Saint Mary's (Minnesota) and Wilmington College (Ohio).

== Head coaching record ==
=== College ===
Record table
| Season | Team | Overall | Conference | Standing | Postseason |
|---|---|---|---|---|---|
Loyola–Chicago Ramblers (Horizon League) (1989–1994)
| 1989–90 | Loyola–Chicago | 7–22 | 3–11 | T–6th | |
| 1990–91 | Loyola–Chicago | 10–19 | 3–11 | 7th | |
| 1991–92 | Loyola–Chicago | 13–16 | 2–8 | 5th | |
| 1992–93 | Loyola–Chicago | 7–20 | 3–11 | T–7th | |
| 1993–94 | Loyola–Chicago | 8–19 | 1–9 | 6th | |
| Loyola–Chicago: | | 45–96 (.319) | 12–50 (.194) | | |
Saint Mary's (MN) Cardinals (Minnesota Intercollegiate Athletic Conference) (1994–1997)
| 1994–95 | Saint Mary's (MN) | 7–17 | 6–14 | 9th | |
| 1995–96 | Saint Mary's (MN) | 6–18 | 4–16 | 10th | |
| 1996–97 | Saint Mary's (MN) | 3–21 | 3–17 | 10th | |
| Saint Mary's (MN): | | 16–56 (.222) | 13–47 (.217) | | |
Wilmington (OH) Quakers (Ohio Athletic Conference) (2003–2004)
| 2003–04 | Wilmington (OH) | 1–25 | 1–17 | 10th | |
| Wilmington (OH): | | 1–25 (.038) | 1–17 (.056) | | |
| Total: | | 62–177 (.259) | | | |
National champion Postseason invitational champion Conference regular season champion Conference regular season and conference tournament champion Division regular season champion Division regular season and conference tournament champion Conference tournament champion
