= Leaning Tower of Niles =

Replica of the Leaning Tower of Pisa

Coordinates: 42.0124°N 87.7840°W

- U.S. National Register of Historic Places
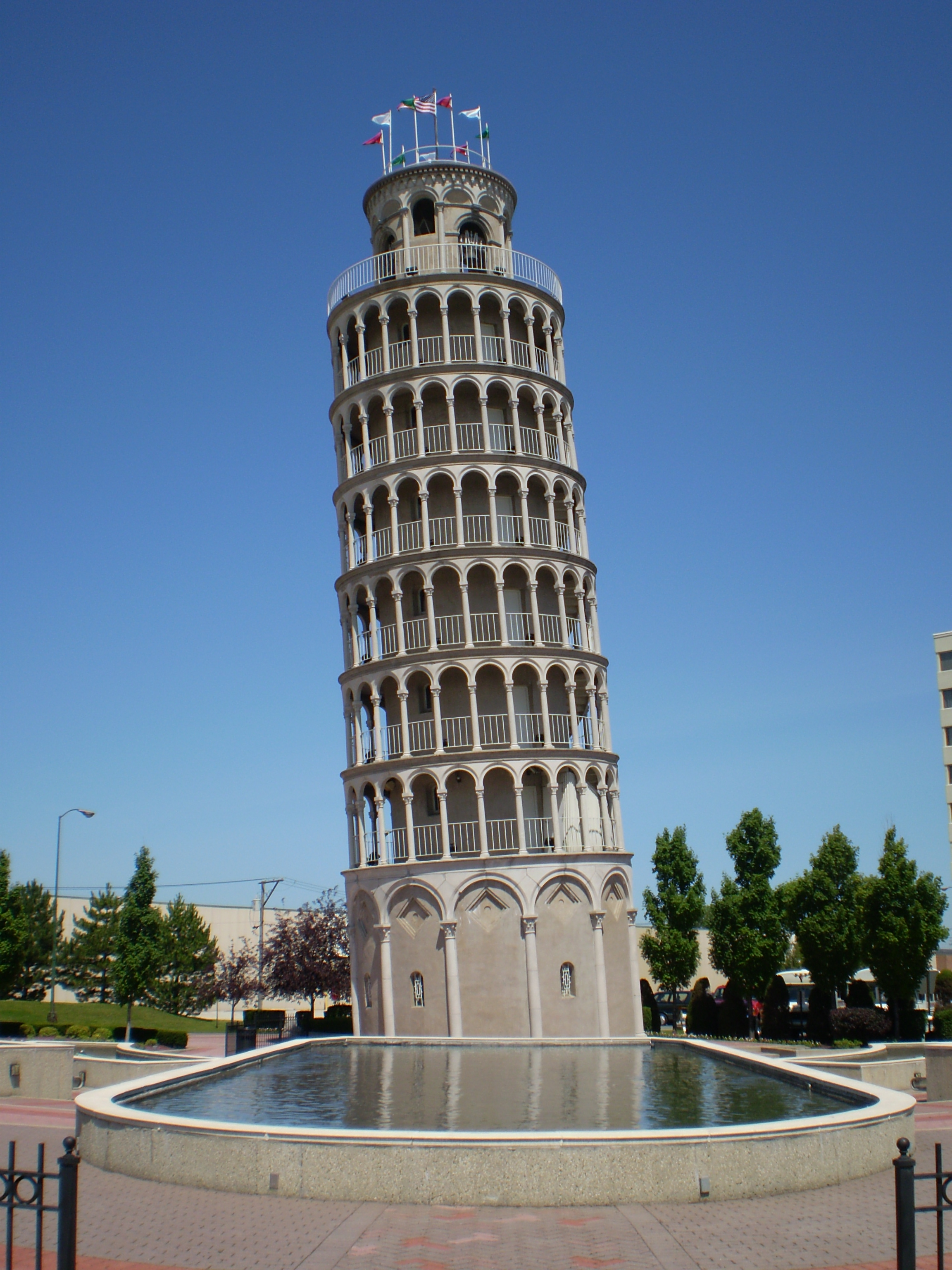
- Location: 6280 W. Touhy Ave. Niles, Illinois
- Built: 1934
- Architect: Albert L. Farr
- NRHP reference No.: 100003645
- Added to NRHP: 4/22/2019

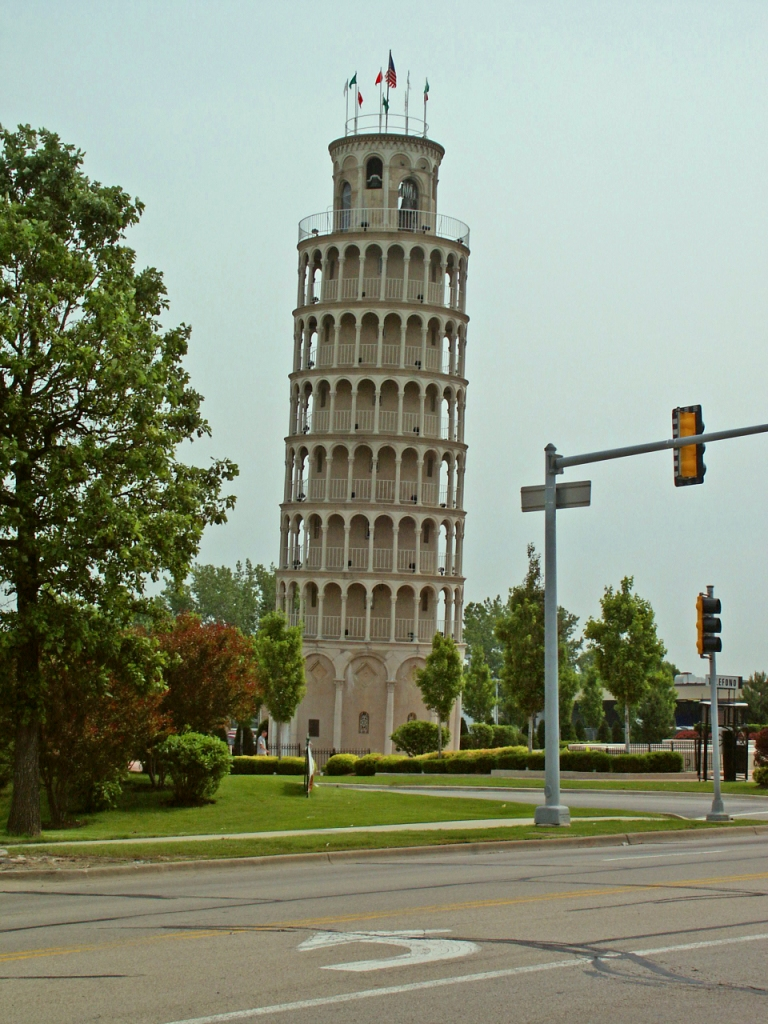
Another view of the tower

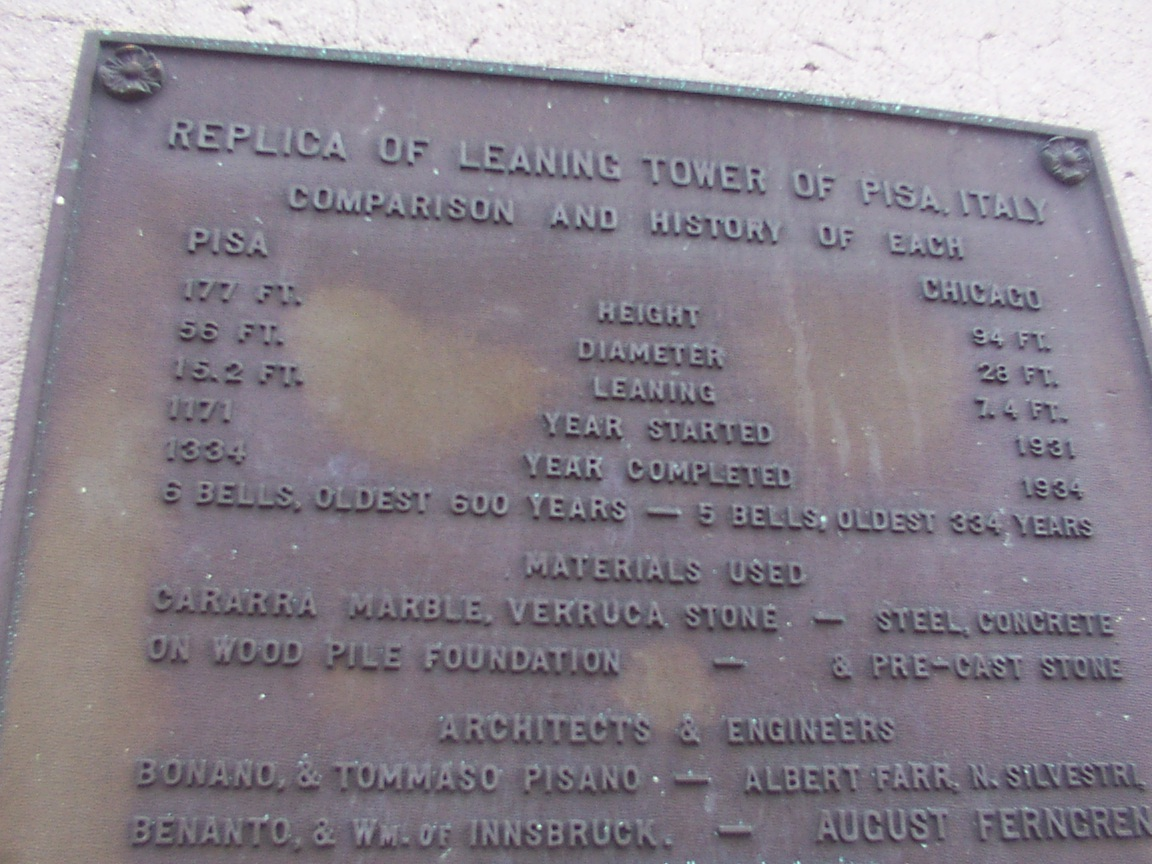
Comparison of the Leaning Towers of Pisa and of Niles

The Leaning Tower of Niles is a half-size replica of the Leaning Tower of Pisa located in Niles, Illinois, a suburb of Chicago. Designed by architect Albert L. Farr and completed in 1934, it was commissioned by industrialist Robert Ilg as part of a recreation park for employees of the Ilg Hot Air Electric Ventilating Company of Chicago. It is situated at 6300 W. Touhy Avenue.

Ilgair Park's pools and artificial lake needed a large water tank and pumping equipment to function, which Robert Ilg decided to hide by building a replica of the Leaning Tower of Pisa to house them. In 1960, the descendants of Robert Ilg donated part of the park for the construction of the Leaning Tower YMCA. Other amenities of the employees' recreational park included a wooden toboggan run, which was in decay but still visible in the 1960s.

A study in 2014 concluded that the Leaning Tower of Niles is in need of about $600,000 in repairs.

On November 17, 2015, the Niles Village Board approved a proposal for the village to purchase the Leaning Tower from the YMCA for $10. The Board also approved a contract to spend $550,000 to repair and renovate the building.

On March 15, 2016, Niles voters passed a non-binding referendum approving of the village spending the money to renovate the tower.

The Leaning Tower of Niles contains five bells. Three of the bells were cast in Cavezzo, Italy, in 1623, 1735 and 1747. How they came to be included in the tower is not known.

The tower was listed on the National Register of Historic Places in 2020.

== Symbol of city ==
In 1991, the village of Niles, Illinois, established a sister city pact with Pisa, Italy. A US$1.2 million renovation of the Leaning Tower of Niles was started in 1995 by Mayor Nicholas Blase and the Board of Trustees, and was completed in 1996, improving the structure, façade and the Plaza area. The Leaning Tower Plaza area now has four fountains and a 30-foot pool. Village web site and publications include images of the tower. Leaning Tower Concert Series are summertime open-air music concerts sponsored by the village since the 1990s.
