= Northridge Preparatory School =

Location
- 8320 Ballard Road; Niles, Illinois 60714; United States

Information
- Type: Private
- Motto: Juvenes vestri visiones videbunt. (Your young men shall see visions.)
- Religious affiliation: Catholic (Opus Dei)
- Established: 1976
- Headmaster: Niall Fagan
- Grades: 6–12
- Gender: Boys
- Colors: Maroon and gold
- Song: "We are the Northridge Knights"
- Mascot: Dwight The Knight
- Team name: Knights
- Newspaper: High School - Equitibus; Middle School - De Scalibus
- Affiliation: Opus Dei
- Website: www.northridgeprep.org

Northridge Preparatory School, or Northridge Prep, or NRP is an independent college preparatory school for young men, located in Niles, Illinois. The school offers a recognized curriculum and a strong athletics program.

Northridge was established in 1976 by a group of parents who envisioned a college preparatory school that would challenge their sons academically, socially and spiritually. Realizing the importance of the middle school years, they sought to include grades 6 through 12 in the Northridge curriculum. The founding parents entrusted the spiritual dimension of Northridge to Opus Dei, a Personal prelature of the Roman Catholic Church that was founded in 1928.

Northridge is the brother school of The Willows Academy, a girls college preparatory school in Des Plaines, Illinois; parents continue to foster a relationship with The Willows Academy by organizing dances and social events throughout the school year.

The School is a member of The Independent School League and Illinois High School Association.

== The Halls System ==
Northridge students are divided into four halls: Cavalier, Riddervon, Paladin, and Vytis. The students in those halls then participate in annual competitions to accumulate points to their respective halls. The most recent hall that won was in the 2024-25 school year and the hall winner was the Paladin Hall. The colors for each hall are yellow for Cavalier, black for Riddervon, maroon for Paladin, and since 2025 green for Vytis, undergoing a rebrand from a greyish-white.

== Advisory Program ==
A key component of the Northridge educational program is its advisory system. Each student is assigned a faculty mentor who meets with the student regularly throughout the school year and remains available for additional guidance. The advisory sessions address academic, personal, and social matters and may include discussions of the student's strengths, areas for improvement, study habits, and relationships. Faculty mentors may also provide guidance on personal development and matters related to faith and virtue.

Upperclassmen also receive college and career counseling. Faculty mentors serve as a point of communication between students, their families, and the school regarding the student's academic and personal development.

== Relationship with The Archdiocese of Chicago ==
Northridge was founded by parents as an independent school that is guided by the teachings of the Catholic Church and therefore is not financially tied to the Archdiocese as are diocesan Catholic schools. The school is not listed in the Archdiocese of Chicago school list, and so does not require the Chicago Catholic Schools Placement exam. In 2008, Northridge Prep was awarded the Catholic Honor Roll, which distinguishes it as a "Top 50 Catholic High School in America" under the three criteria of standardized test scores, Catholic Identity and academic curriculum.

== Athletics ==
Northridge offers a number of athletic activities and plays in the Independent School League.

Will Rey, former Head Basketball Coach at Loyola University, is Northridge 's Athletic Director and Head Varsity Basketball Coach.

Other sports at Northridge are Soccer, Tennis, Cross Country, Track, and Baseball.

Recently in 2024 the Cross-Country team won the Class 1A State Finals. By far their best record and performance led by the head Cross-country coach, Coach Julian Murphy.

== Extracurriculars ==
There are numerous extracurriculars available for middle and high school students alike, including Engineering Club, Ski Club, and Pickleball Club, among others. The Boxing Club hosts a fight night in the gym. Media Club, a paid opportunity for students, provides photo documentation of Northridge events. Math and Chess Teams have consistently placed highly in the region and state. The Rocketry Club is among the top teams in the country. Northridge hosts four FIRST Tech Challenge robotics teams; the varsity team, 11139 Knight Owls, is very competitive in its region, which consistently sends winning teams to the world championships. Service Club provides students with an opportunity to serve their community, visiting nursing homes and helping the poor. Investment Club teaches students to be responsible with their money, and to put it to good use in the stock market. It hosts speakers from many professions in the economic field from numerous companies. The Northridge Drama Program puts on at least two high quality shows each year, such as Journey's End and Arsenic and Old Lace.
