= St. John Brebeuf Catholic Church =

Parish church of the Archdiocese of Chicago

Coordinates: 42.03291°N 87.8056°W

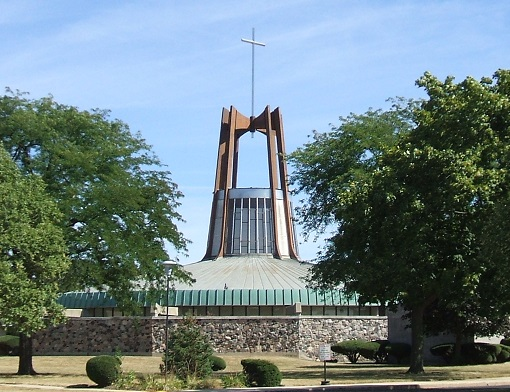
St. John Brebeuf Church in 2013

St. John Brebeuf Catholic Church is a parish in the Archdiocese of Chicago, located in Niles, Illinois.

St. John Brebeuf Church was founded in 1953 and was the first Catholic parish in Niles. The current church building was completed in 1966. The church is named in honor of Saint Jean de Brébeuf.

== Parish School ==
The St. John Brebeuf parish school educates children from pre-school through eighth grade. The school is also home to troop 175 of the Boy Scouts of America.
