= Slovak Zion Synod =

Synod of the Evangelical Lutheran Church in America

Slovak Zion Synod—ELCA
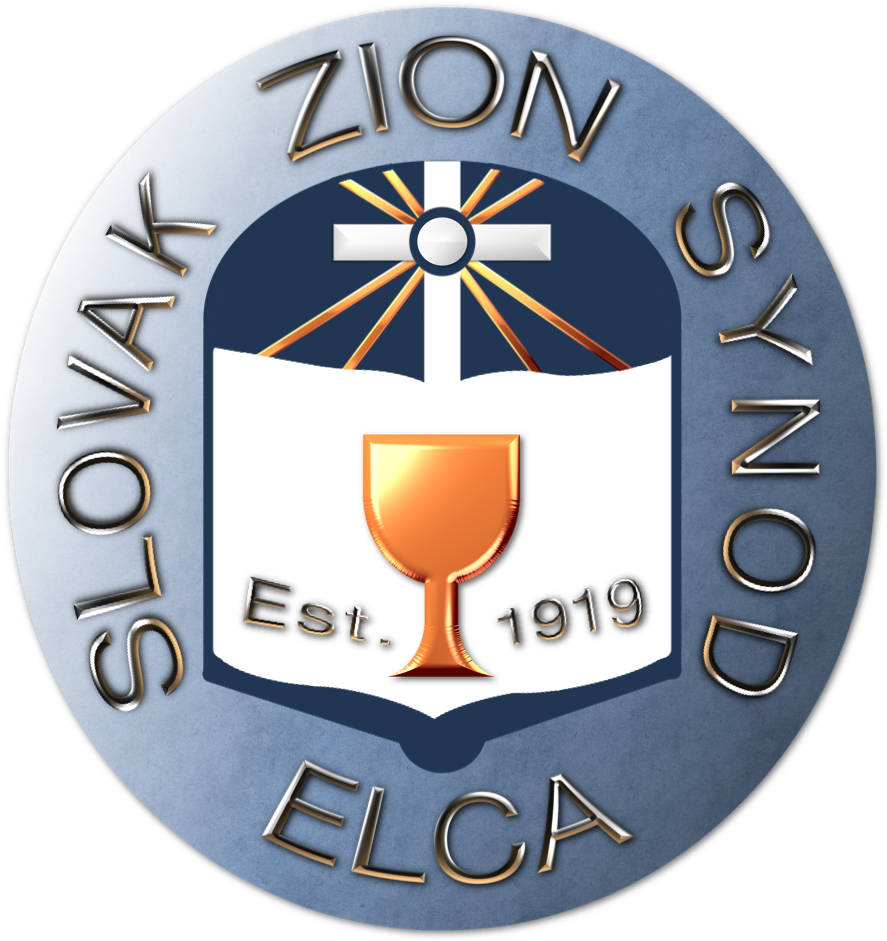
- Emblem of the Slovak Zion Synod
- Classification: Protestant
- Orientation: Mainline Lutheran
- Bishop: Wilma S. Kucharek
- Associations: Evangelical Lutheran Church in America; Lutheran World Federation; Slovak Evangelical Church of the Augsburg Confession in Serbia; Silesian Evangelical Church of the Augsburg Confession; Evangelical Church of the Augsburg Confession in Slovakia
- Region: non-geographic
- Origin: Est. 1919 (Joined the ULCA in 1920); Braddock, Pennsylvania
- Congregations: 20 (2001)
- Members: 2,635 baptized members (2021)
- Official website: slovakzionsynod.org

The Slovak Zion Synod is a group of 20 Lutheran congregations and one of the 65 synods that make up the Evangelical Lutheran Church in America. It is the only non-geographic synod in the ELCA, the only ELCA synod to have a congregation in Canada, and the only synod defined by its mission and outreach, instead of geography. The synod was founded by Slovak immigrants in 1919 as the Slovak Evangelical Lutheran Zion Synod and joined with the United Lutheran Church in America, remaining as a separate synod in that denomination. The policy continued when the ULCA merged into the Lutheran Church in America (1962) and later the ELCA (1988).

The synod has congregations in the states of Connecticut, Illinois, Michigan, New Jersey, New York, Ohio, and Pennsylvania, and in Ontario, Canada.

The Rev. Wilma S. Kucharek is currently bishop of the Slovak Zion Synod, elected in 2002. She succeeded the Rev. Juan Čobrda (1993–2002) who succeeded the Rev. Kenneth E. Zindle. Kucharek was re-elected to a second term as bishop on June 28, 2008, to a third term on November 17, 2014, and to a fourth term on December 14, 2022, by the same governing body. As of 2025, Kucharek is the longest-serving female bishop in the ELCA.

== Synod assemblies ==
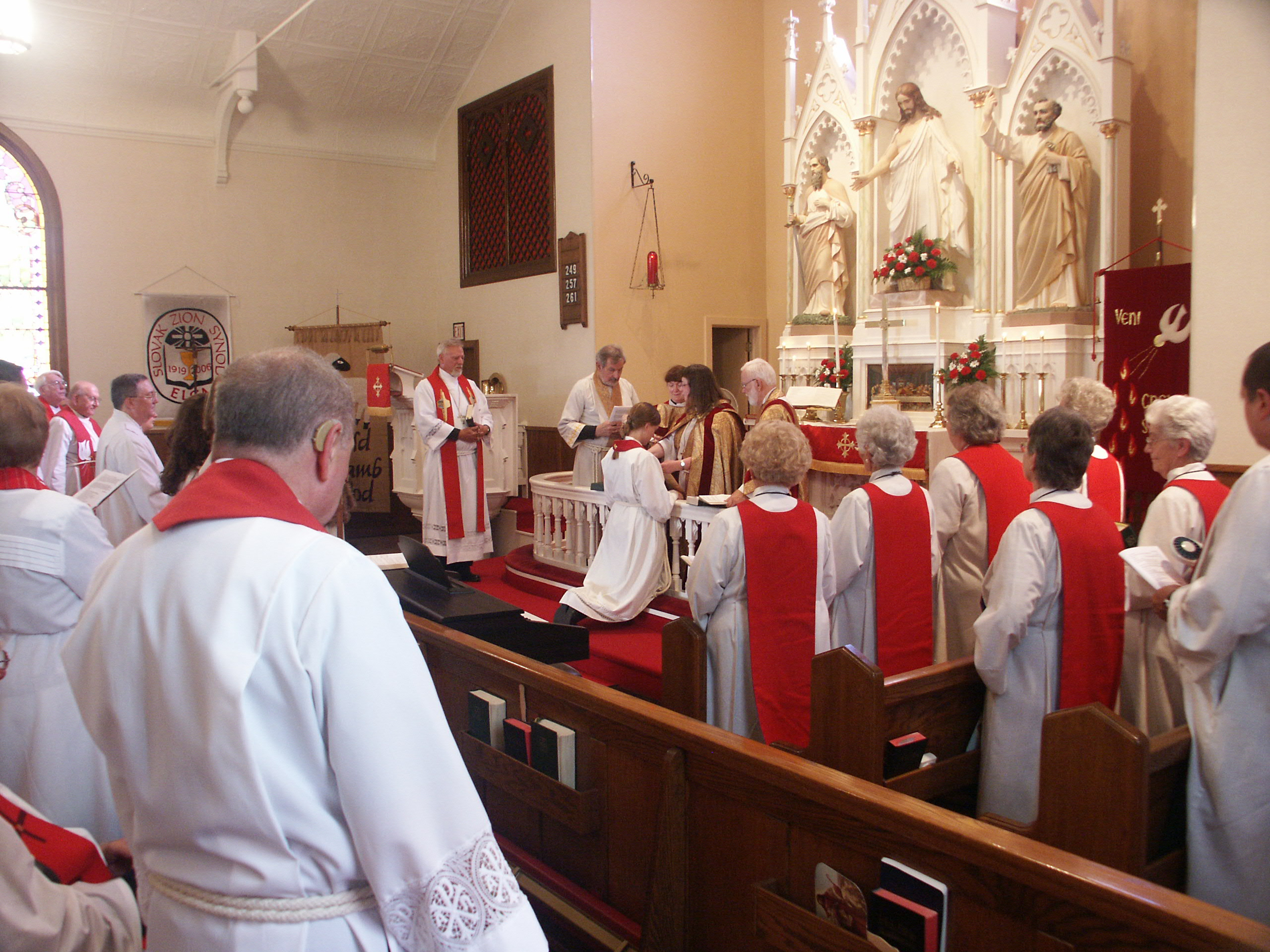
An ordination in June 2006

Every year, the synod's largest legislative body convenes to govern the church body. The assembly typically consists of plenary sessions focused on business, enrichment and worship.

In the early 2000s, synod assemblies were held at many of the synod's own churches in order to establish a stronger relationship and understanding between the congregation and its own accomplishments through the greater church expressions of the Slovak Zion Synod and the ELCA. More recently, the assemblies have taken place on cruise ships because the cost was less than conventional meeting sites and lodging.

- 2002 - Muhlenberg College, Allentown, Pennsylvania
- 2003 - Ascension Lutheran Church, Binghamton, New York
- 2004 - Holy Trinity Lutheran Church, Union, New Jersey
- 2005 - Ascension Lutheran Church, Binghamton, New York
- 2006 - Sts. Peter and Paul Lutheran Church, Hazleton, Pennsylvania
- 2007 - St. John the Evangelist Lutheran Church, Lansford, Pennsylvania
- 2008 - Holy Trinity Lutheran Church, Union, New Jersey
- 2009 - Holy Trinity Lutheran Church, Union, New Jersey
- 2010 - Aboard Carnival Glory from New York City to Saint John, New Brunswick
- 2011 - Aboard Carnival cruise ship from New York City to Saint John, New Brunswick
- 2013 - Aboard Carnival Pride from Baltimore to Orlando, Florida, and Nassau and Freeport in the Bahamas
- 2014 - Aboard the Carnival Dream from New Orleans to Key West, Florida to Freeport, New York
- 2016 - Aboard the Carnival Splendor from Miami to Montego Bay, Grand Cayman, and Cozumel
- 2018 - Aboard the Carnival Triumph from New Orleans to Cozumel and Progreso, Yucatán
- 2019 - Aboard the Carnival Magic from Ft. Lauderdale to Half Moon Cay, Grand Turk, and Amber Cove, Dominican Republic
- 2022 - Aboard the Norwegian Getaway from New York to Bermuda
