= Pete Sykaras =

Greek baseball player (born 1979)

Panagiotis "Pete" Sykaras (born 5 May 1979 in Niles, Illinois) is a Greek baseball player who competed in the 2004 Summer Olympics.
