= Juan Čobrda =

Slovak-American Lutheran bishop (1930–2010)

- Born: August 11, 1930
- Died: July 1, 2010 (aged 79)
- Occupation: bishop of the Lutheran church

The Rev. Juan Čobrda (11 August 1930 – 1 July 2010) was a bishop of the Lutheran church, heading a national church body in Argentina and the Slovak Zion Synod in the United States.

== Early life ==
He was born in Príbovce, near Martin, Slovakia on 11 August 1930. After World War II his family immigrated to Argentina.

== Life and career ==
Čobrda was ordained by the United Evangelical Lutheran Church of Argentina in 1958 and served as that church's bishop from 1966 to 1976.

In the city of Rosario in 1960 he met his future wife, Žofia. In 1975, he was forced to leave Argentina. He was able to return there in 1978.

Between the years 1993 – 2002, Rev. Juan Čobrda served as bishop of the Slovak Zion Synod. He succeeded the Rev. Kenneth E. Zindle. In 1993, he was one of the last ELCA bishops to serve a four-year term. The Evangelical Lutheran Church in America (ELCA) 1993 Churchwide Assembly extended the term of a bishop's service to six years. On 28 June 1997 he was re-elected. The election took place during the Slovak Zion Synod Assembly, 27–29 June, at Muhlenberg College, Allentown, Pennsylvania. He decided to resign on 31 August 2002, one year before the end of his second term. Afterwards, he retired and moved to Niles, Illinois.

Čobrda died on 1 July 2010.
