= Syd Lucas =

British World War I veteran (1900–2008)

Sydney Lucas
- Born: 21 September 1900; Leicester, England
- Died: 4 November 2008 (aged 108); Rosebud, Victoria, Australia
- Military career
- Allegiance: United Kingdom; Australia
- Branch: British Army; Australian Army
- Service years: August 1918–? 1940–1941
- Rank: Private
- Units: 45th Sherwood Foresters; 2/1st Machine Gun Battalion
- Conflicts: World War I World War II

Sydney Maurice Lucas (21 September 1900 – 4 November 2008) was one of three remaining British Tommies of World War I (along with Harry Patch and Netherwood Hughes), although the war ended before he was sent to fight.

== Early life ==
Sydney Maurice Lucas was born in Leicester, England on 21 September 1900. He was conscripted into the British Army's Sherwood Foresters while a teenager in August 1918. Lucas was also, along with his compatriots Claude Choules and Bill Stone, and France's Fernand Goux, one of the four remaining veterans in the world to have served in both World Wars. Like Choules, he lived in Australia, in Rosebud, Victoria, the same state as the last Australian veteran John Campbell Ross.

== Military service ==
Lucas shipped to Australia in 1928. On 13 June 1940, during World War II, he volunteered for the 2nd Australian Imperial Force, enlisting at Caulfield, Victoria, with a home locality of Coburg, Victoria, both suburbs of Melbourne, and listing Gladys Lucas as next of kin. Lucas was allotted service number VX26480 and posted to the 2/1st Australian Machine Gun Battalion. He was sent to join his battalion in Palestine, but a bout of appendicitis resulted in him having an operation on his gallbladder on arrival, and so he was not medically fit to join the battalion when it sailed for Greece in early April 1941. Lucas was transferred to prisoner-of-war duties, guarding Italian and German prisoners of war being shipped to Australia on the RMS Queen Mary. He was discharged from the Australian Military Forces on 7 November 1941, with the rank of private. His posting at discharge was Headquarters, Guard Battalion.

== Death ==
Lucas died on 4 November 2008, aged 108, one week before the 90th Anniversary of Armistice Day.
