= List of last surviving World War I veterans =

This is a list of the last known surviving veterans of the First World War (28 July 1914 – 11 November 1918) who lived to 1999 or later, along with the last known veterans for countries that participated in the war. Veterans are defined as people who were members of the armed forces of the combatant nations during the conflict, although some states use other definitions.

Florence Green, a British citizen who served in the Allied armed forces as a Royal Air Force (WRAF) service member, is generally considered to have been the last verified veteran of the war at her death on 4 February 2012, aged 110. (Note: Jiroemon Kimura, who died in 2013 (aged 116) and who was the oldest verified man in history and the last verified man to have been born in the 19th century, served as a conscript in an Imperial Japanese Army communications unit in Tokyo from April 1–June 30, 1918; this was discovered by gerontology researchers verifying his life history.) The last combat veteran was Claude Choules, who served in the British Royal Navy (and later the Royal Australian Navy) and died 5 May 2011, aged 110. The last veteran who served in the trenches was Harry Patch (British Army), who died on 25 July 2009, aged 111. The last Central Powers veteran, Franz Künstler of Austria-Hungary, died on 27 May 2008 at the age of 107.

The total number of participating personnel is estimated by the Encyclopædia Britannica at 65,038,810. There were approximately 9,750,000 military deaths during the conflict.

== Last surviving veterans of each country ==
Country (Note: Other combatant countries included Bulgaria, Greece, the Kingdom of Hejaz, (Note: Accorded belligerent status at the Paris Peace Conference in 1919.) and Portugal.)	Veteran	Death date	Age
Armenia	Senekerim Arakelian	9 September 2000	98 years
Australia (Note: A partially self-governing Dominion under the British Empire, foreign relations remained with the British government.)	John Campbell Ross	3 June 2009	110 years
Austria (Note: Austria and Hungary were component, technically sovereign, nations within the Austro-Hungarian Empire.)	August Bischof	4 March 2006	105 years
Belgium	Cyriel Barbary (Note: At the time of his death in 2001 at the age of 102, Paul Ooghe was widely believed to be the last surviving Belgian veteran of the conflict. Barbary, who had served in the Belgian army in the final months of the war and emigrated to the United States, was only subsequently recognised.)	16 September 2004	105 years
Brazil	Waldemar Levy Cardoso	13 May 2009	108 years
Canada	John Babcock	18 February 2010	109 years
China	Zhu Guisheng	5 March 2002	106 years
Czechoslovak Legions	Alois Vocásek	9 August 2003	107 years
Denmark	Lorenz Gram	26 December 2004	105 years
France	Lazare Ponticelli (Note: Following the legal definition of a war veteran as a person having served for six months during the war years (for which Picault did not qualify), the French government officially recognized Lazare Ponticelli, who died on 12 March 2008, as the last poilu.)	12 March 2008	110 years
Germany	Erich Kästner	1 January 2008	107 years
Guyana (Note: As a British colony, foreign relations remained with the British government.)	Gershom Browne	6 December 2000	102 years
Hungary	Franz Künstler	27 May 2008	107 years
India	Robert Francis Ruttledge	12 January 2002	102 years
Italy	Delfino Borroni	26 October 2008	110 years
Jamaica	Stanley Stair	April 2008	107 years
Japan	Yasuichi Sasaki	26 July 2006	108 years
Montenegro	Danilo Dajković	14 September 1993	97 years
New Zealand	Bright Williams	13 February 2003	105 years
Newfoundland	Wallace Pike	18 April 1999	99 years
Ottoman Empire	Yakup Satar	2 April 2008	110 years
Poland	Stanisław Wycech	12 January 2008	105 years
Romania	Gheorghe Pănculescu	9 January 2007	103 years
Russia	Mikhail Krichevsky (Note: Krichevsky was Ukrainian and was the last living veteran overall. Dmitry Malozemov (d. 1998) was the last in Russia.)	26 December 2008	111 years
Serbia	Aleksa Radovanović	22 June 2004	103 years
Siam	Yod Sangrungruang	9 October 2003	106 years
South Africa	Norman Benjamin Kark	30 March 2000	102 years
United Kingdom	Florence Green (Note: Thomas Shaw (d. 2002) was the last surviving veteran from Ireland, and Alfred Anderson (d. 2005) was the last from Scotland.)	4 February 2012	110 years
United States	Frank Buckles	27 February 2011	110 years

== Veterans by country of service – 9 veterans who lived to 2009 or later ==
On 27 June 2006, the British Government approved a National Memorial Service at Westminster Abbey, to take place after the death of the last known World War I veteran from the United Kingdom. On 11 November 2009, despite the survival to that date of Claude Choules and Florence Green, the commemoration was held following the death of Harry Patch. On 21 November 2006, the House of Commons of Canada approved a state funeral for the last World War I veteran to have served in the Canadian forces, but this was declined by John Babcock.

Country served	Name	Born	Died	Notes
Australia	John Campbell Ross	11 March 1899	3 June 2009 (110)	Last Australian digger and the last veteran of any status to serve Australia in the conflict. Joined in early 1918 as wireless operator, but did not see action. Served in Home Guard in World War II. Australia's oldest person. Lived in Bendigo, Victoria.
Canada	John Babcock	23 July 1900	18 February 2010 (109)	Last Canadian veteran. Declined state funeral. Joined in 1916. Served first in 146th, CEF, then transferred to Boys Battalion. Completed training in UK but did not see action due to age. Moved to US in 1924. Lived in Spokane, Washington.
United Kingdom	Henry Allingham	6 June 1896	18 July 2009 (113)	Last airman. Served in the 12 Squadron RNAS (later RAF). Joined in 1915 as mechanic. Last veteran of the Battle of Jutland. World's oldest man and oldest ever British man. Oldest veteran ever to see action. Lived in Brighton, Sussex.
United Kingdom	Claude Choules	3 March 1901	5 May 2011 (110)	Last living combatant of World War I. Last seaman. Last veteran who served in both World Wars. Last male veteran. Joined in 1916. Last witness to the German Naval surrender. Moved to Australia in 1926 and served with Royal Australian Navy in World War II. Lived in Perth, Western Australia.
United Kingdom	Florence Green	19 February 1901	4 February 2012 (110)	Last female veteran and last officially recognized veteran. Worked as a waitress in the Royal Air Force; the Women's Royal Air Force. Lived in North Lynn, Norfolk. Not recognized as a veteran until 2008.
United Kingdom	Netherwood Hughes	12 June 1900	4 April 2009 (108)	Called up to the 51st Manchester Regiment in mid 1918 as truck driver. Did not see action as he was still in training. Lived in Accrington, Lancashire.
United Kingdom	Harry Patch	17 June 1898	25 July 2009 (111)	Last Tommy. Served in the British Army under the 7th Duke of Cornwall's Light Infantry. Last veteran to serve in trenches and to be wounded in action. Called up in 1916. Last survivor of Battle of Passchendaele. Fireman in World War II. Europe's oldest man upon death. Lived in Wells, Somerset.
United Kingdom	Bill Stone	23 September 1900	10 January 2009 (108)	Joined Royal Navy in 1918. Did not see action as he was still in training, but was also a World War II veteran. Lived in Reading, Berkshire at the time of his death.
United States	Frank Buckles	1 February 1901	27 February 2011 (110)	United States Army 1st Fort Riley Casual Detachment. Last American veteran. Joined in 1917. Ambulance driver near Western Front. Held prisoner in World War II as a civilian. Lived in Charles Town, West Virginia.

== Likely verifiable – 1 veteran who lived to 2009 or later ==
Country served	Name	Born	Died	Notes
Japan	Jiroemon Kimura	19 April 1897	12 June 2013 (116)	Probable last verifiable surviving Empire of Japan veteran and possible last verifiable surviving veteran from any combatant nation. Served as a conscripted soldier in an Imperial Japanese Army communications unit from April 1–June 30, 1918, posted to Nakano, Tokyo; saw no action. Oldest verified man in history at the time of his death, and the last verified surviving man to have been born in the 19th century. Service verified from official government records by gerontology researchers confirming his life history. Lived in Kyōtango, Kyoto Prefecture.

== Unverified World War I veterans – 4 possible veterans who lived to 2009 or later ==
Listed here are the possible veterans who were not verified as a World War I veteran.

Country served	Name	Born	Died	Notes
Italy	Sante Dal Santo	8 September 1902	26 February 2009 (106)	Claimed to have joined up in 1916 at the age of 14 as a "Digger" digging trenches and tunnels. Also served in World War II. Lived in Montecchio Precalcino.
Italy	Carlo Dozzi	25 January 1901	30 May 2009 (108)	Claimed to have joined up in 1917 at the age of 16 as a "Digger" digging trenches and tunnels. Also served in World War II. Lived in Maniago.
United Kingdom	Harry Futcher	21 April 1904	27 May 2010 (106)	Claimed to have joined up in 1918 at the age of 14 as a bandsman in the British Army serving in Egypt during the First World War. Lived in Dorset, England.
United Kingdom	Douglas Edward "Doug" Terrey	23 June 1903	26 June 2010 (107)	Claimed to have joined up in 1917 as bicycle courier delivering messages in the Southampton Military District. Served in Home Guard in World War II. Lived in Southampton, Hampshire.

== World War I era veterans – 8 veterans who lived to 2009 or later ==
Listed here are those that joined the armed services after the Armistice date, but before the Treaty of Versailles was signed, or where there is debate on their join-date, or whose military service is sometimes viewed as outside the scope of "WWI", but are considered World War I-era veterans by the press or by their respective governments, or served in a related conflict.

Country served	Name	Born	Died	Notes
Brazil	Waldemar Levy Cardoso	4 December 1900	13 May 2009 (108)	Last Brazilian World War I-Era veteran, served in the Brazilian Army, joining in late 1918 but did not see action. Lieutenant Colonel in World War II. Last living Brazilian field marshal. Later lived in Rio de Janeiro.
Finnish Socialist Workers' Republic	Aarne Arvonen	4 August 1897	1 January 2009 (111)	Last Red Guard veteran from the Finnish Civil War. Oldest Nordic person and Finland's oldest ever man. Last living Finn born in the 19th century. Lived in Järvenpää.
Finland	Lauri Nurminen	9 September 1906	20 February 2009 (102)	Last White Guard and possibly last Finnish Civil War veteran. Served in Ernst Linders Satakunta army group. Lived in Valkeakoski, Finland.
France	Félix Maximilian Rostaing	27 December 1900	31 December 2009 (109)	French World War I-Era veteran, served in the Franco-Turkish War. Re-enlisted in 1928 and served in China, Mali and Morocco. Lived in Capbreton, France.
Germany	Helmut Fink	18 March 1901	27 April 2009 (108)	Last German Revolution veteran and last German World War I-era veteran, served in the Freikorps during the German Revolution of 1918 and 1919. Lived in Germany.
Poland	Józef Kowalski	2 February 1900	7 December 2013 (113)	Last World War I-era veteran, fought in the Polish Soviet War between 1919 and 1921.
Poland	Wilhelm Meisel	7 January 1904	3 June 2009 (105)	Last Silesian Uprisings veteran, joined up in 1919 at the age of 15 and served for the Polish Army during the Silesian uprising until it ended in 1921. Lived in Poland.
United States	Robley Rex	2 May 1901	28 April 2009 (107)	Last American World War I-era veteran, joined 5th Infantry Division in May 1919. Later moved to 28th Infantry. Served in Intelligence Unit. Lived in Louisville, Kentucky.

== Totals – 21 veterans who lived to 2009 or later ==
- Verified veterans – 9
- Unverified veterans – 4
- World War I-era veterans – 8

== See also ==
- List of last surviving veterans of military insurgencies and wars
- List of last surviving veterans of World War II
