= Harry Patch =

English soldier and supercentenarian (1898–2009)

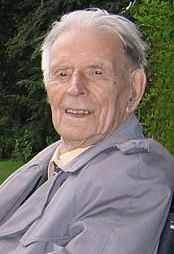
- Patch, aged 109, in 2007
- Born: Henry John Patch; 17 June 1898; Combe Down, Somerset, England
- Died: 25 July 2009 (aged 111 years, 38 days); Wells, Somerset, England
- Burial place: St Michael's Church, Monkton Combe
- Spouses: Ada Billington (m. 1919; d. 1976); Kathleen Joy (m. 1982; d. 1989); Doris Whittaker (1998; d. 2007)
- Children: 2
- Military career
- Allegiance: United Kingdom
- Branch: British Army; British Expeditionary Force
- Service years: 1916–1918
- Rank: Lance corporal Private (after demotion)
- Service number: 29295
- Unit: Duke of Cornwall's Light Infantry
- Conflicts: First World War; Western Front; Battle of Passchendaele (WIA)
- Awards: See medals

Henry John Patch (17 June 1898 – 25 July 2009), dubbed in his later years "the Last Fighting Tommy", was an English supercentenarian, briefly the oldest man in Europe, and the world's last surviving trench combat soldier of the First World War. Patch was not the longest-surviving soldier of the First World War, but he was the fifth-longest-surviving veteran of any sort from the First World War, behind British veterans Claude Choules and Florence Green, Frank Buckles of the United States and John Babcock of Canada. At the time of his death, aged 111 years and 38 days, Patch was the fourth-oldest man in the world, behind Walter Breuning, Horacio Celi Mendoza, and Jiroemon Kimura.

== Early life ==
Harry Patch was born in the village of Combe Down, near Bath, Somerset, England. He appears in the 1901 Census as a two-year-old boy along with his stonemason father William John Patch (1863–1945), mother Elizabeth Ann (née Morris) (1857–1951) and older brothers George Frederick (1888–1983) and William Thomas (1894–1981) at a house called "Fonthill" in Gladstone Road. The family are recorded at the same address "Fonthill Cottage" in the 1911 census. His elder brothers are recorded as a carpenter and banker mason. Longevity ran in Patch's family; his father lived to 82, his mother to 94, his brother George to 95 and his brother William to 87. Patch left school in 1913 and became an apprentice plumber in Bath.

== First World War ==
In October 1916, during the First World War, he was conscripted into the British Army as a private, reporting for duty at Tolland Barracks, Taunton. During the winter of 1916–17 he was promoted to lance corporal, but was demoted after a fistfight with a soldier who had taken Patch's boots from his billet, and he saw no further promotion. Patch went through a series of short-lived attachments to several regiments, including the Royal Warwickshire Regiment, before being posted after completing training to the 7th (Service) Battalion, Duke of Cornwall's Light Infantry, serving as an assistant gunner in a Lewis gun section.

Patch arrived in France in June 1917. He fought on the Western Front at the Battle of Passchendaele (also known as the Third Battle of Ypres) and was wounded, when a shell exploded overhead at 22:30 on 22 September 1917, killing three of his comrades. He had a two-inch piece of shrapnel removed from his groin; as there was no anaesthetic remaining in the camp he chose to have the operation done without anaesthesia. He was removed from the front line and returned to England on 23 December. Patch referred to 22 September as his own personal Remembrance Day. He was still convalescing on the Isle of Wight when the Armistice with Germany was declared the following November.

When the war ended, I don't know if I was more relieved that we'd won or that I didn't have to go back. Passchendaele was a disastrous battle—thousands and thousands of young lives were lost. It makes me angry. Earlier this year, I went back to Ypres to shake the hand of Charles Kuentz, Germany's only surviving veteran from the war. It was emotional. He is 107. We've had 87 years to think what war is. To me, it's a licence to go out and murder. Why should the British government call me up and take me out to a battlefield to shoot a man I never knew, whose language I couldn't speak? All those lives lost for a war finished over a table. Now what is the sense in that?

— Harry Patch, November 2004

=== Medals ===
Patch received eight medals and honours; for his service in the First World War, he received the British War Medal and the Victory Medal. In 1998, as a surviving veteran of the First World War, who had fought for the Allies in France and Flanders, the President of the Republic of France made him a Knight of the Légion d'honneur. The award was presented to Patch on his 101st birthday. On 9 March 2009, Patch was appointed an Officer of the Légion d'honneur by the French Ambassador at his nursing home in Somerset. On 7 January 2008, Albert II, King of the Belgians, conferred upon Patch the award of Knight of the Order of Leopold. He received the award from Jean-Michel Veranneman de Watervliet, Belgium's Ambassador to the United Kingdom, at a ceremony in the Ambassador's residence in London, on 22 September 2008, which coincidentally was the 91st anniversary of the day he was wounded in action and three of his closest friends killed.

For service during the Second World War, Patch was awarded the 1939–45 Defence Medal. This was subsequently lost and on 20 September 2008, at a ceremony at Bath Fire Station, Patch was presented with a replacement medal. Patch also received two commemorative medals: the National Service Medal and the Hors de combat medal, which signifies outstanding bravery of servicemen and women, who have sustained wounds or injury in the line of duty. The medals are unofficial and not a part of the official order of wear in any Commonwealth realm. In accordance with his wishes, Patch's medals are displayed at the Duke of Cornwall's Light Infantry Museum in Bodmin.

== Personal life ==
After the war, Patch returned to work as a plumber, during which time he spent four years working on the Wills Memorial Building in Bristol, before becoming manager of the plumbing company's branch in Bristol. A year above the age to be called up for military service at the outbreak of the Second World War in 1939, he became a part-time fireman in Bath, dealing with the Baedeker raids. Later in the war he moved to Street, Somerset, where he ran a plumbing company until his retirement at the age of 65.

Patch married Ada Emily Billington (1891–1976) at the Parish Church, Hadley, Shropshire on 13 September 1919. They had two children, Denis and Gordon. Ada died in 1976, aged 85. Patch subsequently married Kathleen Alice Joy at Mendip Register Office on 5 June 1982. Harry was 83 and Kathleen, known as Jean, was 80. Jean died aged 87 on 18 March 1989. At the age of 100, Patch moved to Fletcher House Nursing Home in Wells, where he found a companion in Doris Whitaker. Doris died on 19 March 2007, aged 92. Patch's sons, Denis and Gordon, both predeceased him.

== The Last Fighting Tommy ==
Patch consistently refused to discuss his war experiences until approached in 1998 for the BBC One documentary Veterans, on reflection of which, and with the realisation that he was part of a fast-dwindling group of veterans of "the war to end all wars", he agreed. Patch was featured in the 2003 television series World War 1 in Colour and said "if any man tells you he went over the top and he wasn't scared, he's a damn liar". He reflected on his lost friends and the moment when he came face to face with a German soldier. He recalled the story of Moses descending from Mount Sinai with God's Ten Commandments, including "Thou shalt not kill" and could not bring himself to kill the German. Instead, he shot him in the shoulder, which made the soldier drop his rifle. However, he had to carry on running towards his Lewis Gun, so to proceed, he shot him above the knee and in the ankle. Patch said,

I had about five seconds to make the decision. I brought him down, but I didn't kill him… Any one of them could have been me. Millions of men came to fight in this war and I find it incredible that I am the only one left.

— Commenting on graves at a Flanders war cemetery, July 2007.

In November 2004, at the age of 106, Patch met Charles Kuentz, a 107-year-old Alsatian veteran, who had fought on the German side at Passchendaele (and served on the French side in World War II). Patch was quoted as saying: "I was a bit doubtful before meeting a German soldier. Herr Kuentz is a very nice gentleman however. He is all for a united Europe and peace – and so am I". Kuentz had brought along a tin of Alsatian biscuits and Patch gave him a bottle of Somerset cider in return. The meeting was featured in a 2005 BBC TV programme The Last Tommy, which told the stories of several of Britain's last World War I veterans.

In December 2004, Patch was given a present of 106 bottles of Patch's Pride Cider, which has been named after him and produced by the Gaymer Cider Company. In the spring of 2005 he was interviewed by the BBC Today programme, in which he said of the First World War: "Too many died. War isn't worth one life" and in July 2005, Patch voiced his outrage over plans to build a motorway in northern France over cemeteries of the First World War. In July 2007, marking the 90th anniversary of the beginning of the Battle of Passchendaele, Patch revisited the site of the battle in Flanders, to pay his respects to the fallen on both sides. He was accompanied by historian Richard van Emden. On this occasion, Patch described war as the "calculated and condoned slaughter of human beings" and said that "war isn't worth one life". In August 2007, Patch's autobiography The Last Fighting Tommy, written with Richard van Emden, was published, making him one of the oldest authors ever. With the proceeds from this book, Patch decided to fund an Inshore Lifeboat for the Royal National Lifeboat Institution (RNLI) and he attended the RNLI's Lifeboat College on 20 July 2007, to officially name the boat The Doris and Harry. In 2008, the poet laureate of the United Kingdom, Andrew Motion, was commissioned by the BBC West television programme Inside Out West, to write a poem in Patch's honour. Entitled "The Five Acts of Harry Patch" it was first read at a special event at the Bishop's Palace in Wells, where it was introduced by the Prince of Wales and received by Harry Patch.

In July 2008, Wells City Council conferred the freedom of the city of Wells on Patch. On 27 September 2008, in a private ceremony attended by a few people, Patch opened a memorial on the bank of the Steenbeek, at the point where he crossed the river in 1917. The memorial reads,

Here, at dawn, on 16 August 1917, the 7th Battalion, Duke of Cornwall's Light Infantry, 20th (Light) Division, crossed the Steenbeek prior to their successful assault on the village on Langemarck. This stone is erected to the memory of fallen comrades, and to honour the courage, sacrifice and passing of the Great War generation. It is the gift of former Private and Lewis Gunner Harry Patch, No. 29295, C Company, 7th DCLI, the last surviving veteran to have served in the trenches of the Western Front."

Also in September 2008, Patch visited the nearby Langemark German war cemetery and laid a memorial wreath on the grave of an Imperial German Army soldier who was killed in action on 16 August 1917; the day that Private Patch's Division had attacked and taken the village of Langemarck during the Battle of Passchendaele. Noticing three acorns nestled beside the German soldier's gravestone, Patch picked them up, brought them back to England, and planted the acorns beside the Fletcher House nursing home, where he was living in Wells, Somerset.

In October 2008, Patch launched the 2008 Royal British Legion Poppy Appeal in Somerset. On 11 November 2008, marking the 90th anniversary of the end of World War I, together with fellow veterans Henry Allingham and Bill Stone, Patch laid a commemorative wreath for the Act of Remembrance at The Cenotaph in London, escorted by Victoria Cross recipient Johnson Beharry. On 9 November 2008, the Master of the Queen's Music, Sir Peter Maxwell Davies, attended the world premiere of his choral work paying tribute to Patch. The piece sets words by the Poet Laureate, Andrew Motion, and was performed at Portsmouth Cathedral by the London Mozart Players, the Portsmouth Grammar School chamber choir and the cathedral's choristers. The creation of the work was featured in A poem for Harry, a BBC West documentary that was subsequently repeated on BBC Four. The programme won a gold medal at the New York Festivals International Television Programming and Promotion Awards.

On 18 July 2009, with the death of Henry Allingham, Patch became the oldest surviving veteran and also the oldest man in the United Kingdom. Patch was the last trench veteran of World War I. The penultimate Western Front veteran, the 108-year-old Fernand Goux of France, who died on 9 November 2008, fought for 8 days. He came out unscathed, unlike Patch and the last Alpine Front veteran, 110-year-old Delfino Borroni of Italy, who died on 26 October 2008. Patch was also the last surviving Tommy, since the death on 4 April 2009 of Netherwood Hughes, who was still in training when the war ended. The last-but-one fighting Tommy, Harold Lawton, died on 24 December 2005. Claude Choules, the last remaining First World War naval veteran, died on 5 May 2011.

We came across a lad from A company. He was ripped open from his shoulder to his waist by shrapnel and lying in a pool of blood. When we got to him, he said: 'Shoot me'. He was beyond human help and, before we could draw a revolver, he was dead. And the final word he uttered was 'Mother.' I remember that lad in particular. It's an image that has haunted me all my life, seared into my mind.

— An extract from Patch's book The Last Fighting Tommy which was read out at his funeral by Marie-France André, the chargé d'affaires of the Belgian embassy, August 2009.

=== Honorary degree ===
On 16 December 2005, Patch was awarded an honorary degree of Master of Arts, honoris causa, by the University of Bristol, whose buildings he helped construct in the 1920s. The University's restored Wills Memorial Building was reopened by Patch on 20 February 2008. He was chosen for this honour as he was a member of the workforce that originally helped build the tower, which was opened on 9 June 1925 by King George V, an event which Patch also attended. Guinness World Records recognised him as the oldest person to have ever received an honorary degree, at the age of 107 years and 182 days.

== Death ==
Patch died at Fletcher House at 9 a.m. on 25 July 2009, aged 111 years and 38 days. His death came seven days after that of fellow veteran Henry Allingham, the last veteran of The Royal Naval Air Service (RNAS) and founding member of The Royal Air Force (RAF), aged 113. The then Prince Charles, led the tributes to him, saying: "Today, nothing could give me greater pride than paying tribute to Harry Patch, of Somerset". Patch was the last male First World War veteran living in Europe and the last British male known to have been born in the 1800s.

=== Funeral ===
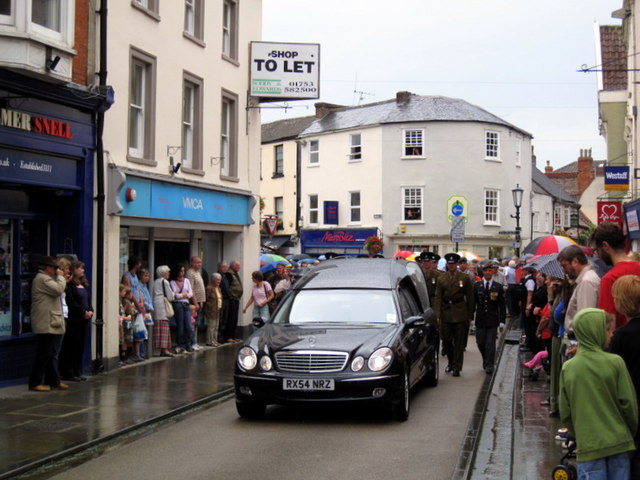
Harry Patch's funeral procession

Patch's funeral was held in Wells Cathedral on 6 August 2009. At 11:00 a.m., the bells of Wells Cathedral were rung 111 times to mark each year of his life. A quarter peal of Grandsire Caters was also rung, half muffled, while quarter-peals were also rung in Bristol and at several churches around the country. His coffin travelled from his home, Fletcher House, to the cathedral where the service commenced at noon. The theme of the service was "Peace and Reconciliation" and in addition to pallbearers from The Rifles (the successor regiment to the Duke of Cornwall's Light Infantry), Patch's coffin was accompanied by an honour guard of two private soldiers each from the armies of Belgium, France, and, most symbolically, from the armed forces of the Federal Republic of Germany. According to his friend and biographer Richard van Emden, Patch, "an ordinary man who had worked so hard towards reconciliation between former foes... had genuinely died surrounded by peace."

In accordance with Patch's instructions, no guns were allowed at the funeral and even the officiating soldiers did not have their ceremonial weapons. Due to public interest in the funeral, which was broadcast live on TV and radio, 1,050 tickets were made available for the service. Some, wanting to pay their respects, slept overnight on the Cathedral green in order to get tickets. The funeral was led by John Clarke, Dean of Wells and Peter Maurice, Bishop of Taunton. Among notables to attend the funeral were Camilla Parker Bowles (then Duchess of Cornwall) and Birgitte, Duchess of Gloucester. Patch was buried at St Michael's Church, Monkton Combe, near his parents and brother.

== Legacy ==
Race horse trainer and owner Michael Jarvis named a horse after Patch in 2008. Having bought the horse in October 2007, during that year's Poppy Appeal, the Newmarket trainer decided to name him after a First World War veteran. Michael's daughter suggested Patch after reading an article about him. The horse won the 1:30 at Doncaster racecourse on 8 November 2008, the day before Remembrance Sunday. A commemorative plaque in Patch's memory is to be placed on the Guildhall in Bath.

The BBC commissioned Carol Ann Duffy, the Poet Laureate, to write a poem to mark the deaths of Patch and Henry Allingham (who died one week before Patch, on 18 July 2009). The result, Last Post, was read by Duffy on the Today programme on BBC Radio 4 on 30 July 2009, the day of Allingham's funeral.

On 5 August 2009, the band Radiohead released the song "Harry Patch (In Memory Of)". Singer Thom Yorke explained that the song was inspired by a 2005 interview with Patch on the Today programme on BBC Radio 4. The song was sold from Radiohead's website for £1, with proceeds donated to the British Legion.

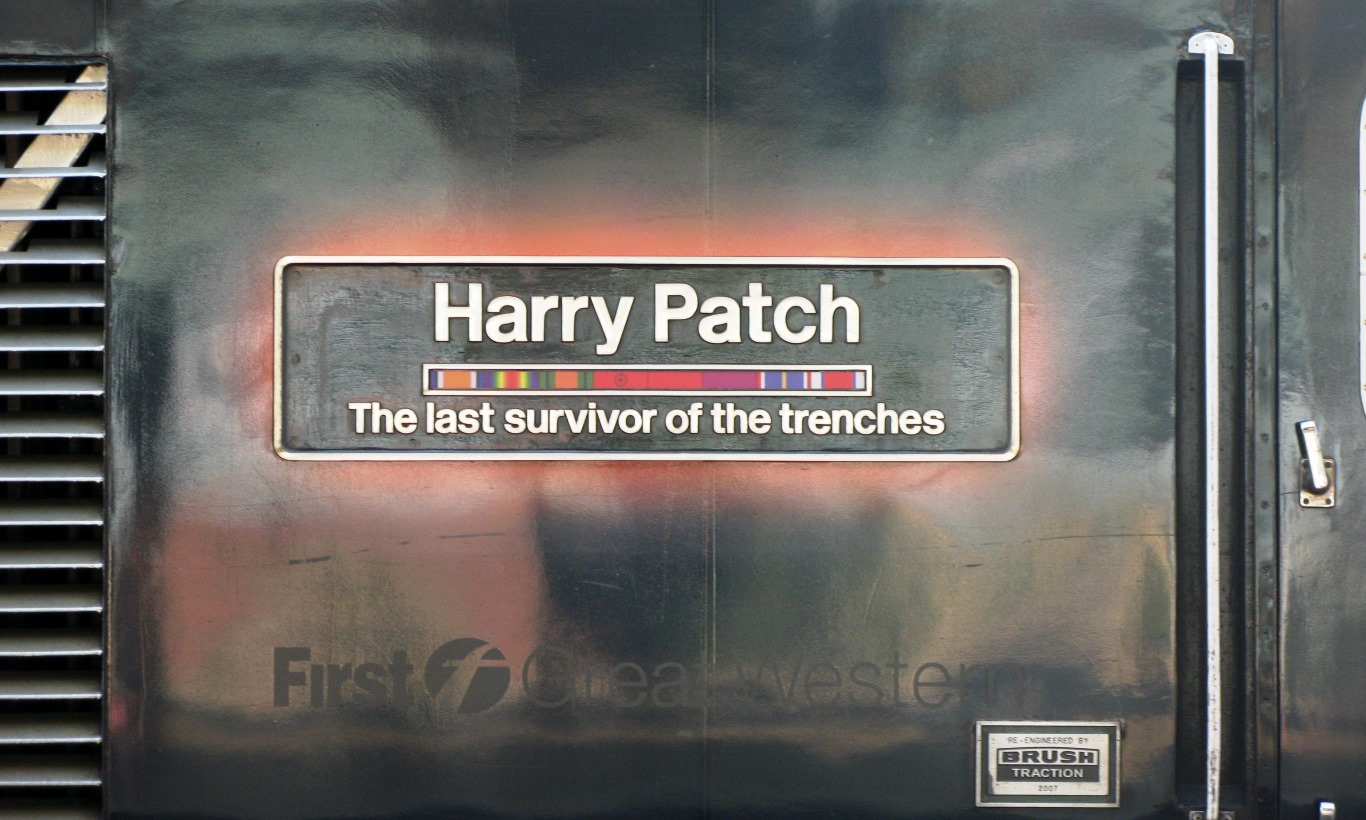
The commemorative nameplate on GWR HST Power Car no. 43172 stands under grey skies at Newton Abbot.

In mid-2009, Harry recorded some spoken word parts for UK heavy metal band Imperial Vengeance, to be included on the title track to the album At the Going Down of the Sun. The song was about the horrors of the trenches and Patch read part of the poem For the Fallen.

The former UK Poet Laureate Andrew Motion composed a poem, The Death of Harry Patch, which he read for the first time on The World at One Radio 4 programme on Armistice Day 2010.

On 6 November 2015, Great Western Railway named one of their Class 43 High Speed locomotives after Harry to commemorate the forthcoming armistice day. The locomotive was wrapped in remembrance vinyls that included images of poppies, soldiers, and text from the 'For the Fallen' poem by Laurence Binyon. The locomotive nameplates read: 'Harry Patch The last survivor of the trenches' and included a coloured line of all eight ribbons from the medals awarded to Patch. The locomotive no longer carries the nameplates or vinyls, these having been removed when the locomotive was retired from service in late 2019 and its subsequent refurbishment and re-entry into service in 2020.

Harry Patch's portrait, painted from life by the artist Bill Leyshon, was commissioned by the Western Daily Press in 2007, and is now in the collections of Somerset Museums Service, Taunton. In 2009 Harry Patch's portrait was painted by Dan Llywelyn Hall and was exhibited at the National Portrait Gallery and is now in the collections of Bath's Victoria Art Gallery

After his death, several articles examined how Patch's life and image served as a reference point for thinking about the meaning of the Great War, commemoration and indeed the figure of the veteran. Patch's hard-won pacifism can be seen to sit uneasily with contemporary jingoism and militaristic rhetoric.

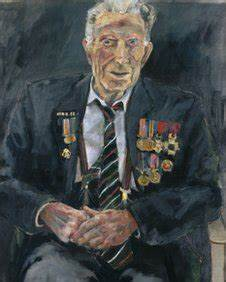
The Last Tommy - by Dan Llywelyn Hall, 2009

== See also ==
- List of British supercentenarians
- List of the verified oldest people
- List of last surviving World War I veterans
