= Erich Kästner (disambiguation) =

Erich Kästner may refer to:

- Erich Kästner (1899–1974), German author
- Erich Kästner (camera designer) (1911–2005), German camera engineer
- Erich Kästner (World War I veteran) (1900–2008), last German veteran to serve in World War I
