= Charles Hedger =

British guitarist (born 1980)

Charles "Ghul" Hedger
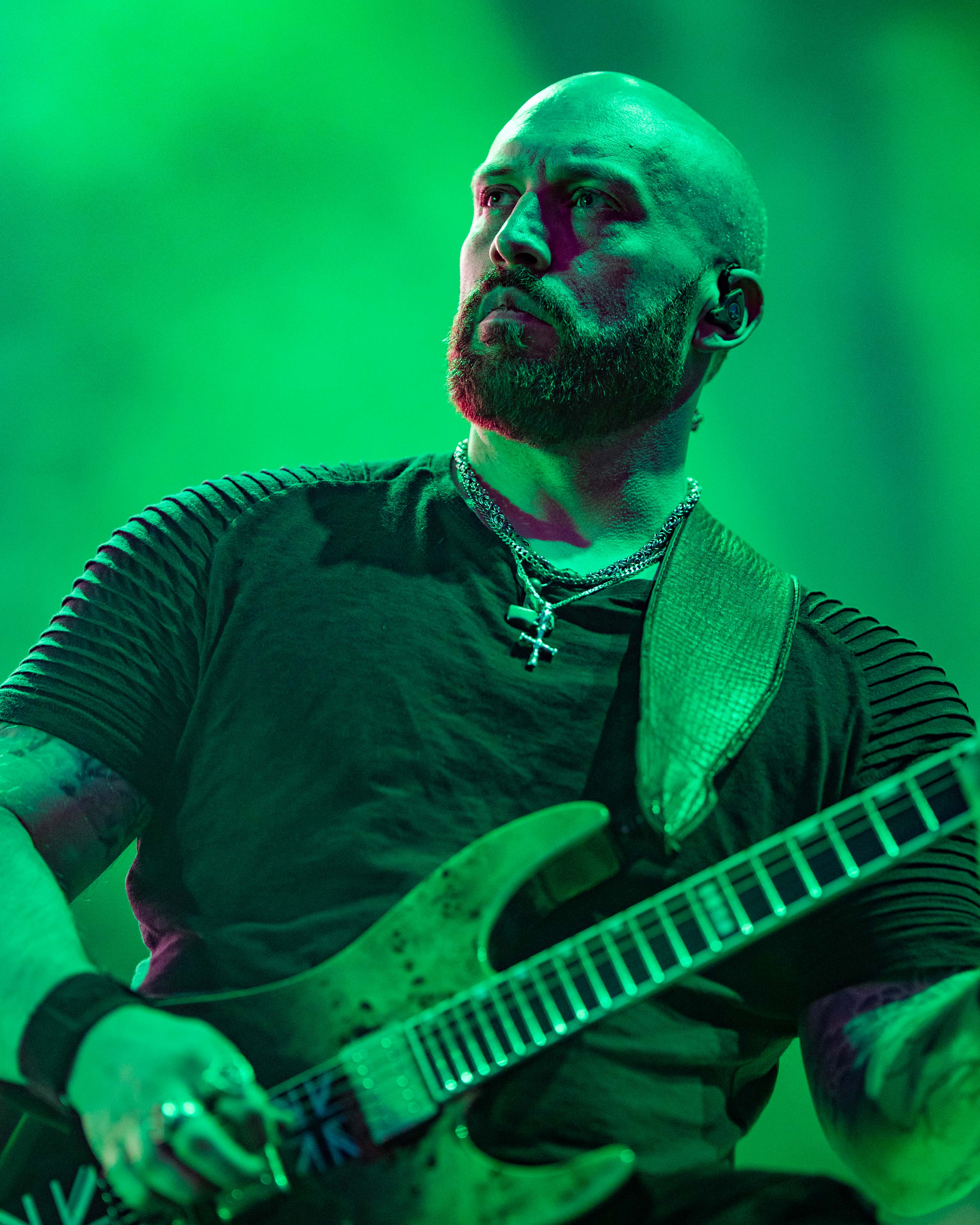
- Hedger with Mayhem at Midgardsblot 2025

Background information
- Also known as: C Edward-Alexander, Ghul
- Born: Charles Edward Alexander Hedger; 18 September 1980 (age 45)
- Genres: Extreme metal, black metal
- Occupation: Musician
- Instruments: Guitar, keyboards, vocals, bass
- Member of: Mayhem, Imperial Vengeance, Shining, Veile, The Kovenant
- Formerly of: Cradle of Filth

Charles Edward Alexander Hedger (born 18 September 1980) is a British guitarist who is known for his stint in the extreme metal band Cradle of Filth and his work with Imperial Vengeance. He currently plays with Norwegian black metal band Mayhem under the alias Ghul. In the past he also performed live on stage with bands like Tormentor and Shining, and continues to do so occasionally.

== Early life ==
Hedger showed musical interest from an early age. When he was 13, his brother gave him a copy of a tape from a local band that some of his friends were in, the demo tape was called The Principle of Evil Made Flesh, from an at the time fledgling British extreme metal band, Cradle of Filth. After learning much about guitar playing, at 19, Hedger decided to take his guitar playing seriously, and he moved to London where he was accepted into the Guitar Institute in London to study a degree course in Popular Music Performance BMus on guitar. He graduated in 2004.

The following year his brother died, and Hedger became greatly influenced to continue his guitar career in honour of his brother. He then started his own band, End of Invention, in which he played lead guitar and vocals. He also began teaching guitar lessons at Colchester Institute, and studied orchestration and composition.

== Cradle of Filth ==
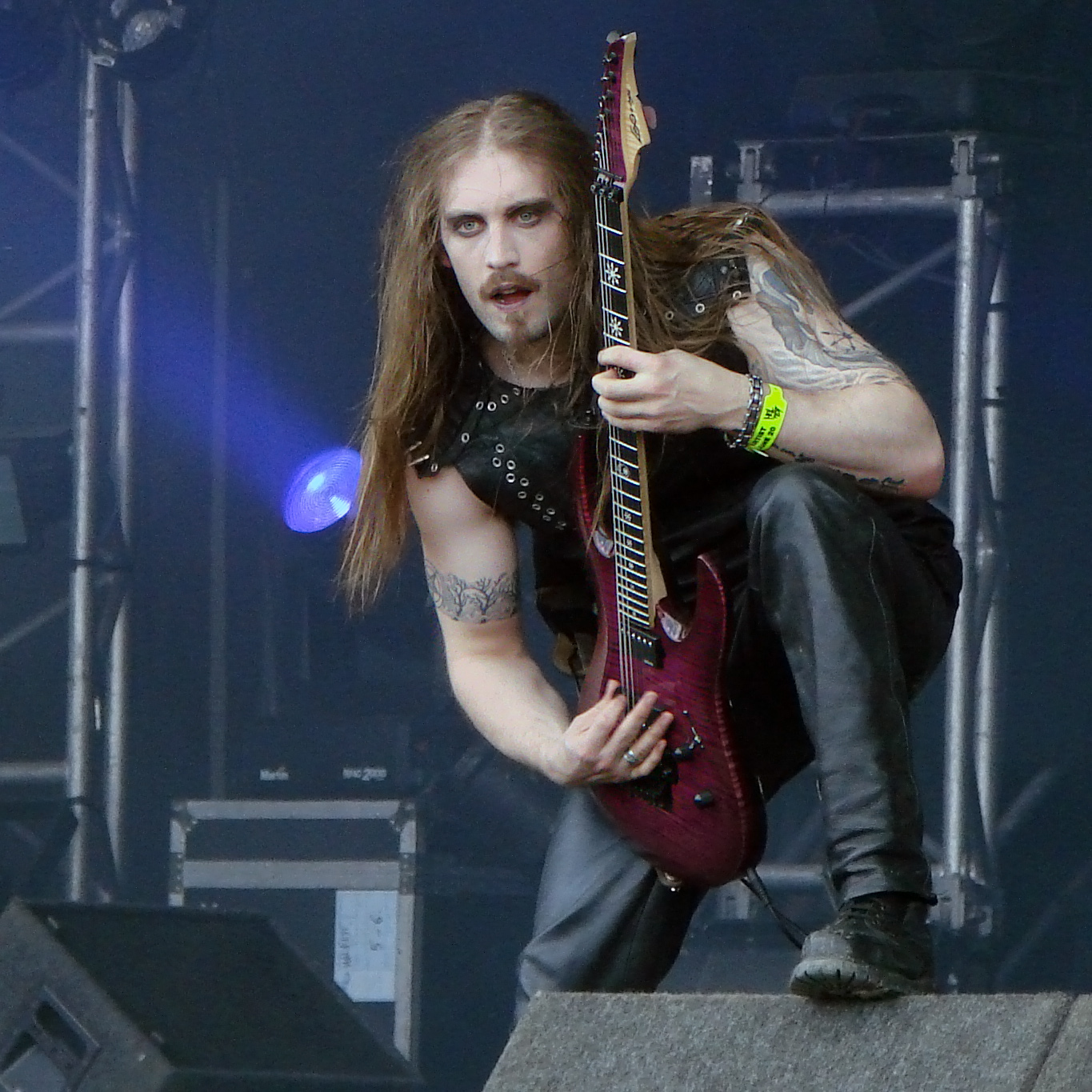
Hedger with Cradle of Filth in 2009.

In 2005, Hedger was asked to fill in on bass guitar for Dave Pybus, who made a short leave from the 2005 Cradle of Filth tour. Upon the return of Pybus, Hedger played guitar along with Paul Allender.

As well as Cradle of Filth, Hedger has his own band, Imperial Vengeance, plays guitar with Mayhem, as well as composing for TV and film, and has written music tuition articles for Terrorizer magazine.
