= Imperial Vengeance =

English heavy metal band

- Origin: Colchester, Essex, England
- Genres: Extreme metal, symphonic metal
- Years active: 2007–present
- Labels: Transcend, Candlelight
- Members: C.Edward Alexander; David Bryan
- Website: imperialvengeance.com

Imperial Vengeance are an English heavy metal band, from Colchester, Essex, England, formed in 2007 by former Cradle of Filth guitarist C. Edward Alexander (b. Charles Edward Alexander Hedger, 18 September 1980, Colchester, Essex/ Guitars, Vocals, Orchestration), and David Bryan (Bass, Lyrics). The band's musical style embraces aspects of symphonic black metal and other extreme metal genres, with lyrical themes and imagery largely influenced by the British Empire period.

After issuing a self-released four-track EP in early 2008 entitled "Death: August and Royal" the band signed a deal with Candlelight Records, and released their debut album "At The Going Down of the Sun" in July 2009. The album's title track was also to feature spoken word from Harry Patch, providing extracts from Laurence Binyon's For the Fallen. During the following September, the band issued a video of the track "6th Airborne Division" which revealed a live line up of additional members consisting of Elle Torry- guitar, James Murray- Guitar, and James Last- Drums. Gigs followed, a notable appearance being at the Hellfire Festival at Birmingham's NEC. The band followed this with an EP that featured a cover of Madness 1979 song Night Boat to Cairo with a suitably eccentric video to accompany the release, signed a management deal with Rob Ferguson of Transcend Management, and moved labels from Candlelight in favour of the Transcend Music Group.

2010 saw the band begin outlining ideas for a second album, and in July issued a DVD that not only featured videos for both "6th Airborne Division" and "Night Boat to Cairo", but also included the filmed footage of the recording session with Harry Patch. It was also announced that the title for this next work would be "Black Heart of Empire" and would feature an appearance from the soprano Lori Lewis (Therion). A Penny dreadful style publication was issued in conjunction with the album.

The band released Black Heart of Empire on 28 September 2011. Other artists that make appearances on the album include Therion soprano Lori Lewis, Vulture Industries vocalist, Bjørnar Erevik Nilsen, and Dave Courtney providing "the Voice of Old London." The album was recorded and engineered by C. Edward Alexander and mastered by Russ Russell.

== Discography ==
=== EPs ===
- Death: August and Royal (2008)

=== Studio albums ===
- At The Going Down of The Sun (2009)
- Black Heart of Empire (2011)

== Current members ==
- C. Edward Alexander – guitar, vocals, orchestration
- David Bryan – bass, lyrics

== Live members ==
- James Last – drums, percussion
- James Murray – guitar

== Other contributors ==
- William Drury – drums, percussion
- Elle Torry – live guitars, violin, cello
- Harry Patch – spoken word
- Dave Courtney – spoken word
- Lori Lewis – sung parts on Black Heart of Empire
- Bjørnar Erevik Nilsen – sung parts of Black Heart of Empire
