= Jack Ross (Australian soldier) =

Australian soldier (1899–2009)

- Born: John Campbell Ross; 11 March 1899; Maryborough, Victoria, Australia
- Died: 3 June 2009 (aged 110 years, 84 days); Bendigo, Victoria, Australia
- Military career
- Allegiance: Australia
- Branch: Australian Imperial Force; Volunteer Defence Corps
- Service years: 1918; 1943–1945
- Rank: Corporal
- Unit: Wireless operator
- Conflicts: World War I World War II
- Awards: Centenary Medal
- Other work: Victorian Railways

John Campbell Ross (11 March 1899 – 3 June 2009) was Australia's oldest living person and the last surviving Australian enlisted soldier from the World War I period at the time of his death. As a civilian, Ross worked for Victorian Railways until he retired in 1964.

== Early life and family ==
Born in Maryborough, Victoria, Ross served as a wireless operator in the Australian Imperial Force, enlisting in January 1918, but never left Australia or saw active service. He later went on to serve in World War II as a corporal with the 20th Battalion, Volunteer Defence Corps.

His wife, Irene (née Laird), predeceased him by several decades. He was survived by a son, Robert, a daughter, Peggy Ashburn, four grandchildren - Jeanette, Heather, Kay, and John – and nine great-grandchildren.

== Honours ==
On 11 November 1998, Ross was awarded the 80th Anniversary Armistice Medal to mark the end of World War I. He had also been awarded the Centenary Medal for contributing to Australian society in the 100 years since federation.

The death of William Evan Allan in October 2005 left Ross as the last Australian digger from the World War I period. However, the English-born Claude Choules, a World War I veteran who served for Britain, lived in Western Australia. Ross became Australia's oldest man, at the age of 108, on 12 June 2007 upon the death of Frank Scarrabelotti. Following the death of 112-year-old E. Beatrice Riley, he was verified as the oldest living person in Australia. For his 110th birthday he received a commemorative letter from the Prime Minister of Australia, Kevin Rudd.

== Death ==
Ross died in his sleep at approximately 4:00 a.m. at the Golden Oaks Nursing Home in Bendigo, on 3 June 2009, at the age of 110 years and 84 days.

== See also ==
- List of last surviving World War I veterans
