= Senekerim Arakelian =

Senekerim "Sam" Arakelian
- Սենեքերիմ Առաքելյան
- Born: May 1, 1902; Erzurum, Ottoman Empire
- Died: September 9, 2000 (aged 98); Montebello, California
- Relatives: Jack Hajinian (grandson)
- Military career
- Conflicts: World War I; Armenian Genocide; Battle of Sardarapat

Senekerim "Sam" Arakelian (May 1, 1902 - September 9, 2000) was an Armenian-American, a survivor of the Armenian Genocide and the Holocaust, and the last surviving Armenian veteran of World War I.

== Early life ==
Senekerim was born to an Armenian family in Erzurum in the Ottoman Empire. He was forced to leave Armenia during World War I and witnessed the Armenian Genocide when he was 13 years old and saw his father and uncle be executed.

=== World War I ===
When Senekerim was 16-years-old, he enlisted in the Armenian Army in 1918 and was involved in the Battle of Sardarapat.

== Post War ==
Following his service, he continued to live in Armenia until World War II, when he was captured by Nazi forces and taken to a concentration camp in Stuttgart with his wife and daughter. They survived and immigrated to the Montebello, California in 1957. He lived in Montebello until his death in 2000, aged 98. In April 2013, an exhibition has held in the city to honor Armenians who were survivors of the genocide. Among the attendees was Jack Hajinian, the grandson of Senekerim and a city councilman.
