= Thomas Shaw (World War I veteran) =

- Born: 1 June 1899; Belfast, Ireland
- Died: 2 March 2002 (aged 102); Bangor, Northern Ireland
- Spouse: Eleanor Shaw (m. 1942)
- Military career
- Allegiance: United Kingdom
- Branch: British Army
- Service years: 1914; 1916–1919
- Rank: Rifleman
- Units: 16th Battalion, Royal Irish Rifles
- Known for: Last living World War I veteran in Ireland
- Conflicts: World War I: Battle of Messines; Battle of Passchendaele

Thomas Shaw (1 June 1899 – 2 March 2002) was the last surviving Irish veteran of World War I. He served in the Royal Irish Rifles regiment of the British Army after joining up in 1916 and fought in battles such as Passchendaele.

== Biography ==
Shaw was born in Belfast on 1 June 1899. He first enlisted as a rifleman aged fifteen in 1914 and went into battle, but was sent home after his brother, a military policeman, met him by chance while in France. In 1916, he joined the 16th battalion of the Royal Irish Rifles and fought in battles such as Messines and Passchendaele. He stayed in Germany as part of the Army of Occupation for six months after the war ended and returned to Ireland in April 1919.

During World War II, he was in charge of meat rations in Belfast. In 1942, he married his girlfriend Eleanor.

Shaw and his wife spent his last 12 years living at The Savoy, a sheltered accommodation development in Bangor, County Down. He died on 2 March 2002 at the age of 102 and was buried in Clandeboye cemetery in Bangor. A plaque in honour of Thomas Shaw was put up at the front door of The Savoy on 4 August 2014.

== See also ==
- List of last surviving World War I veterans by country
