= Erich Kästner (World War I veteran) =

German veteran of WWI and WWII (1900–2008)

- Born: 10 March 1900; Leipzig-Schönefeld, German Empire
- Died: 1 January 2008 (aged 107 years, 297 days); Pulheim, Germany
- Military career
- Allegiance: German Empire (to 1918); Nazi Germany (to 1945)
- Branch: Königlich-Sächsische Armee
- Service years: July 1918 – November 1918; 1939–1945
- Rank: Private (WWI); Major (WWII)
- Units: Sonder-Bataillon Hauck (WWI); Luftwaffe (WWII)
- Conflicts: World War I World War II
- Awards: Lower Saxony Order of Merit
- Other work: Judge

Erich Kästner (10 March 1900 – 1 January 2008) was the last documented World War I veteran who fought for the German Empire (including all nationalities and ethnic groups) and the last who was born in Germany. Consequently he was the last Central Powers combatant of the Western Front. He was also the second oldest man in Germany. However, he was not the last veteran living in Germany. Franz Künstler was an ethnic German who was born in and fought for the Austro-Hungarian Empire, migrating to Germany in 1946 and subsequently becoming a German citizen.

Born in Leipzig-Schönefeld in 1900, Kästner joined the German Army in July 1918, in the "Sonder-Bataillon Hauck", and served on the Western Front in Flanders. He rejoined the military in 1939 and during the Second World War as a major serving as ground support for the Luftwaffe, mostly in France. He died on New Year's Day 2008.

Kästner earned a doctorate in law from the University of Jena in 1924 with a dissertation on Das landwirtschaftliche Pachtwesen und die Pachtschutzordnung unter besonderer Beleuchtung der Verhältnisse des früheren Großherzogtums Sachsen-Weimar-Eisenach (The agricultural leasehold system and the Leasehold Protection Act with special regard to the situation in the former Grand Duchy of Saxe-Weimar-Eisenach). He subsequently worked as a judge at the Higher Regional Court (Oberlandesgericht), for which work he was awarded the Lower Saxony Merit Cross, 1st Class.

== Personal life ==
Kästner was also honored by Germany's president for his 75-year marriage to his wife Maria, shortly before her death in 2003 at the age of 102. Both had lived in Hannover since 1945. Some months before his death, he moved to a retirement home in Pulheim near Cologne. Kästner died on 1 January 2008 in the home.

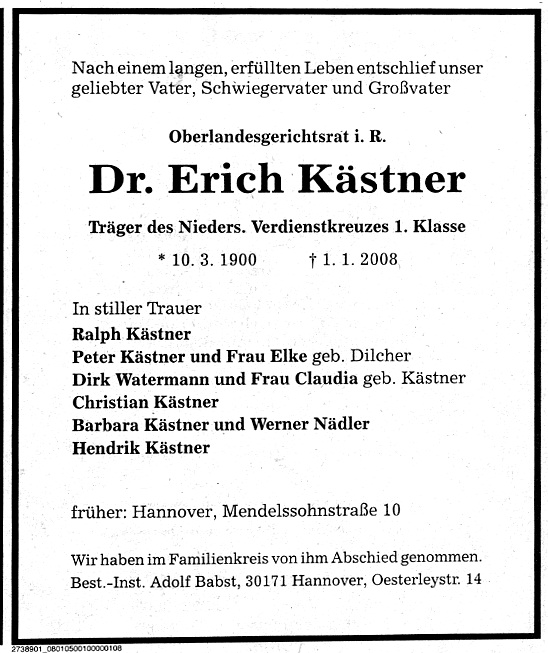
Death notice in Hannoversche Allgemeine Zeitung, 5 January 2008

== See also ==
- List of last surviving World War I veterans by country
