= Robley Rex =

US Army WW1 soldier (1901–2009)

Robley Henry Rex
- Born: May 2, 1901; Hopkinsville, Kentucky, U.S.
- Died: April 28, 2009 (aged 107); Louisville, Kentucky, U.S.
- Burial place: Zachary Taylor National Cemetery
- Spouse: Gracie Bivins (m. 1922; died 1992)
- Military career
- Allegiance: United States
- Branch: United States Army
- Service years: 1919–1922
- Rank: Private first class
- Units: Company B, 5th Infantry Regiment; 8th Infantry Regiment
- Conflicts: World War I; Occupation of the Rhineland
- Awards: Army of Occupation of Germany Medal

Signature
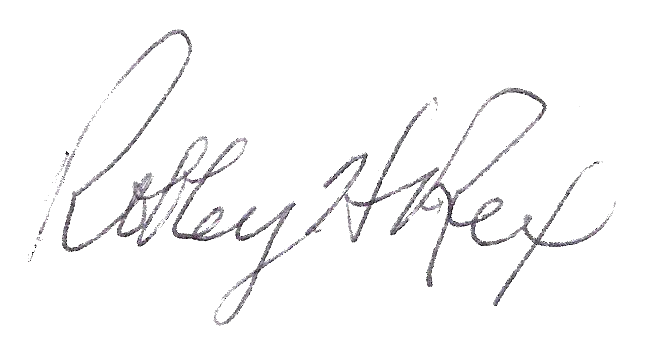

Robley Henry Rex (May 2, 1901 – April 28, 2009) was a World War I-era veteran and was, at the age of 107, one of two remaining U.S. veterans related to the First World War.

== Early life ==
Rex was born May 2, 1901, in Hopkinsville, Kentucky.

== Military service ==
He enlisted in the military in May, 1919, six months after the Armistice date. He served in the 5th Infantry Division and later served in the 28th Infantry Division.

He trained at Camp Zachary Taylor, Kentucky, and Fort Meade, Maryland, before he was deployed to Europe, where there was still a strong military presence, in order to restabilize Europe post-war. While overseas he served in Andernach, and Coblenz, Germany.

He later served in an intelligence unit. After being discharged from the Army with the rank of private first class in August 1922, Rex returned to Louisville, Kentucky, where he became a postal worker and an ordained Methodist minister.

== Personal life ==
Rex met his future wife Gracie at Louisville's Camp Taylor before he was sent to Europe. They married in 1922 but never had children. She died in 1992.

== Later life ==
In 1986, Rex turned to volunteerism, lending support to fellow veterans at the Louisville Veteran's Administration Medical Center. Rex logged more than 14,000 hours of volunteer time while at the center.

He continued to volunteer there three days a week, even at age 105. For his 107th birthday, Rex was presented the Kentucky Governor's Award for Outstanding Volunteer Service. He was also honored in 2005 by the national Veterans of Foreign Wars as National Volunteer of the Year.

== Death ==
Rex died at the Louisville V.A. Medical Center, four days before his 108th birthday. His family requested a private funeral. He was buried on May 6, 2009, at Zachary Taylor National Cemetery. The Louisville V.A. Medical Center was renamed the Robley Rex VA Medical Center in his honor in April 2010.

Upon Rex's death, Frank Buckles (who had actually served in World War I prior to the armistice) became the last surviving United States World War I-era veteran.

== See also ==
- List of last living war veterans
- Last surviving United States war veterans
- List of last surviving World War I veterans
