= Cyriel Barbary =

Last known Belgian WWI veteran (1899–2004)

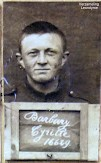
- Barbary in 1915
- Born: 4 August 1899; Klerken, West Flanders, Belgium
- Died: 16 September 2004 (aged 105); Detroit, Michigan, U.S.
- Military career
- Branch: Belgian Army
- Service years: 1918–1919
- Conflicts: World War I

Cyrillus-Camillus Barbary (4 August 1899 – 16 September 2004) was the last known living Belgian veteran of the First World War. He was born in Klerken in West Flanders. He served on the Western Front in the 2nd Regiment of the Line (2de Linieregiment) for the last months of the war, between May 1918 and January 1919. Barbary worked as a mason and emigrated to the United States with his wife Emma in 1923. The couple had three children. He visited Belgium for the last time in 1997.

As a result of his emigration, he was ignored by official commemorations of the last surviving veterans in Belgium. Paul Ooghe was widely reported to have been the last surviving Belgian veteran at the time of his death in 2001. Barbary died in Detroit on 16 September 2004 at the age of 105.

== See also ==
- List of last surviving World War I veterans by country
