= Stanisław Wycech =

Last polish veteran of World War I

- Born: 27 June 1902; Sadoleś, Congress Poland
- Died: 12 January 2008 (aged 105); Warsaw, Poland
- Military career
- Allegiance: Poland
- Branch: Polish Military Organisation
- Service years: February 1917 – November 1920
- Conflicts: World War I Polish Soviet War; World War II

Stanisław Wycech (27 June 1902 – 12 January 2008) was, at age 105, the last Polish veteran of the First World War. At the time of his death, he was, at age 105, the youngest living veteran of the war. Wycech was underage when he enlisted in the Polish Military Organisation in 1917 aged only 15 and participated in the disarming of German troops on 10 November 1918. He did not participate in the Greater Poland Uprising due to contracting typhoid, but was also a veteran of the Polish-Soviet War. He fought during World War II and he took part in the Warsaw Uprising. He resided in Warsaw until his death at age 105.

== See also ==
- List of last surviving World War I veterans by country
