= Richard van Emden =

British author (born 1965)

Richard van Emden is a British author and television documentary producer who specialises in the First World War.

== Life ==
He interviewed over 270 veterans of the Great War and has written 16 books on the subject including the autobiography of Harry Patch, "The Last Fighting Tommy". He has also worked on more than a dozen television programmes on the First World War, including "Britain’s Last Tommies," "Britain’s Boy Soldiers," the award-winning "The Roses of No Man’s Land" and "War Horse: The Real Story."

He lives in West London.

== Bibliography ==
- Clouting, Benjamin (1996). Tickled to Death to Go: The memoirs of a cavalryman in the first world war. Spellmount Publishers Ltd. ISBN 978-1-873376-55-3.
- Prisoners of the Kaiser, Pen and Sword Books (2000).
- Last Man Standing: The Memoirs of a Seaforth Highlander during the Great War, Pen and Sword Books (2002)
- The Trench: Experiencing Life on the Front Line 1916. London: Bantam Press. 2002. ISBN 0-593-04975-6.
- Britain's Last Tommies, Pen and Sword Books (2005).
- Veterans: The Last Survivors of the Great War, Pen and Sword Books (2005).
- Boy Soldiers of the Great War. Headline. 2006. ISBN 978-0-7553-1303-7.
- Famous. Pen and Sword Books Ltd. 2007. ISBN 978-1-84415-642-9.
- The Last Fighting Tommy: The Life of Harry Patch. London: Bloomsbury Publishing. 2007. ISBN 978-0-7475-9115-3.
- The Soldier's War: The Great War Through Veterans' Eyes. Bloomsbury Publishing. 2008. ISBN 978-0-7475-9873-2.
- Sapper Martin: The Secret Great War Diary of Jack Martin. Bloomsbury Publishing. 2009. ISBN 978-1-4088-0267-0.
- Richard van Emden (producer). "Rescued from oblivion". Channel 4. Archived from the original on 23 January 2009. (Note: Credits for "Rescued from oblivion" : Produced to accompany ‘’Horror on the Home Front’’ (a Testimony Films production for Channel 4), first shown on Channel 4 in December 2002. Writer: Steve Humphries. Designer: Clifford Singer at Edition. Editor: Nancy Duin. Project manager: Sarah Woodley. Resources co-ordinator: Nicole Carman. Picture researcher: Nick Pearson. Proofreader/website validator: Elaine Pollard. Photo: Getty Images)
- Tommy's Ark: Soldiers and their Animals in the Great War. Bloomsbury Publishing. 2010. ISBN 978-1-4088-0611-1.
- The Quick and the Dead: Fallen Soldiers and Their Families in the Great War. London: Bloomsbury Publishing. 2011. ISBN 978-1-4088-2245-6.
- Meeting the Enemy: the human face of the great war. Bloomsbury Publishing. 2013. ISBN 978-1-4088-4335-2.
- 1918: The Decisive Year in Soldiers' own Words and Photographs. Crown Forum. 2018. ISBN 978-1-5847-9911-5.
- Missing: The Need for Closure after the Great War, Pen and Sword Books (2020).
