= Gheorghe Pănculescu (general) =

Gheorghe C. Pănculescu (March 26, 1903 – January 7, 2007) was the last Romanian World War I veteran and one of the last World War I veterans in the world. Pănculescu was born in Warsaw, then part of the Russian Empire. In 1918 at the age of 15, he enlisted underage into the Romanian Army, and served in World War I, though he did not see any action. Pănculescu stayed in the army after the war, and by World War II he had reached the rank of General. He died on 7 January 2007 at the age of 103.

== See also ==
- List of last surviving World War I veterans by country
