= Klerken =

- Deelgemeente
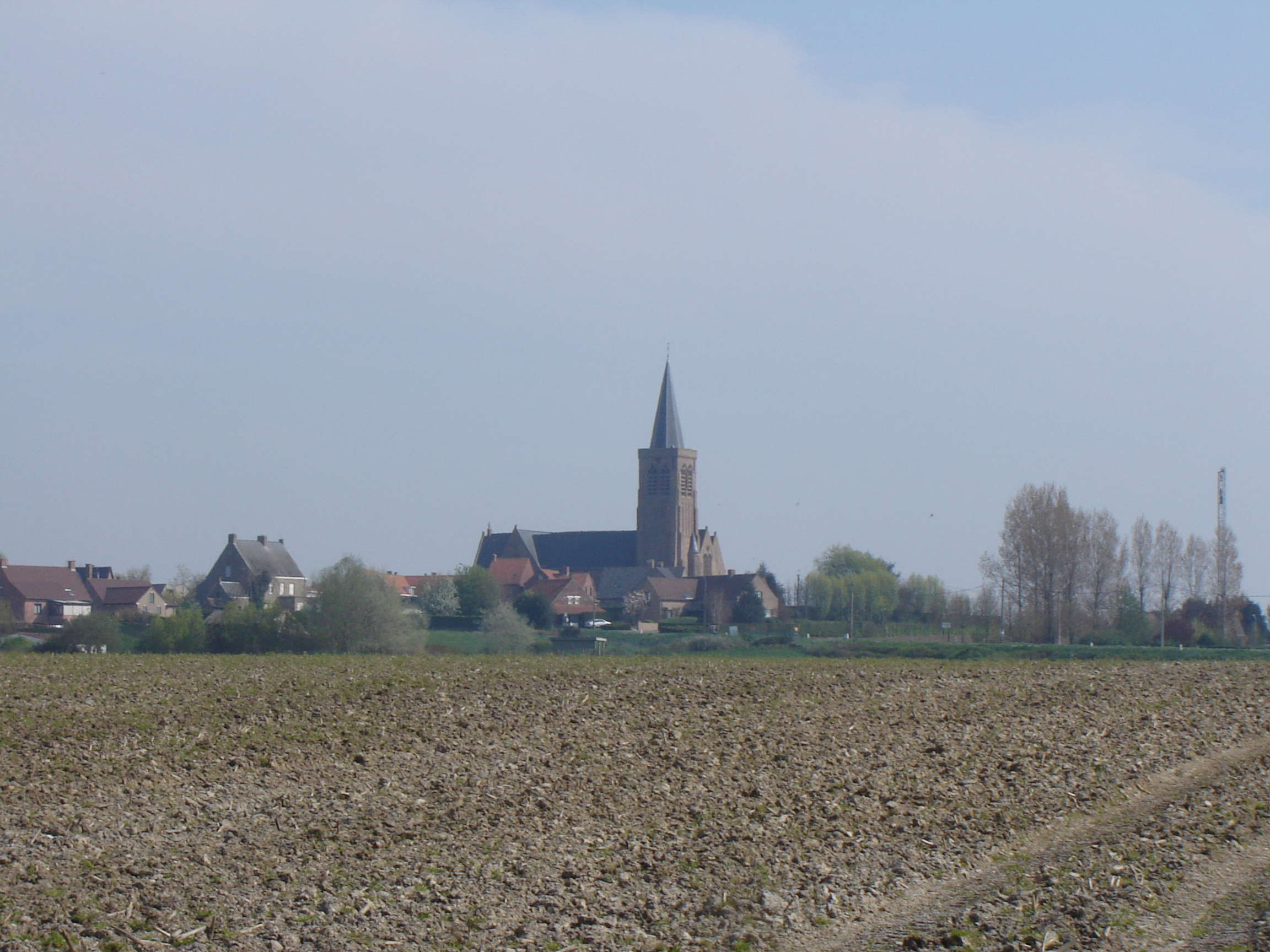
- View of Klerken and the church of St Laurence

- Coordinates: 50°59′52″N 2°54′20″E
- Country: Belgium
- Province: West Flanders
- Municipality: Houthulst

Area
  - Total: 7.44 km^{2} (2.87 sq mi)

Population (2005)
  - Total: 1,831
  - Density: 246/km^{2} (640/sq mi)
- Source: NIS
- Postal code: 8650

Klerken is a village in Province of West Flanders in Belgium. It forms a part of the commune of in Houthulst. It was first mentioned in a letter by Arnulphus the Elder from 961 and the village's archives survive from as early as 1653.

Notable buildings include the Vredesmolen (a damaged windmill which is a war memorial) and the village's church of St Laurence (Sint-Laurentiuskerk).

- Cyriel Barbary, the last surviving Belgian veteran of World War I, was born in Klerken.
