= Henry Allingham =

English supercentenarian (1896–2009)

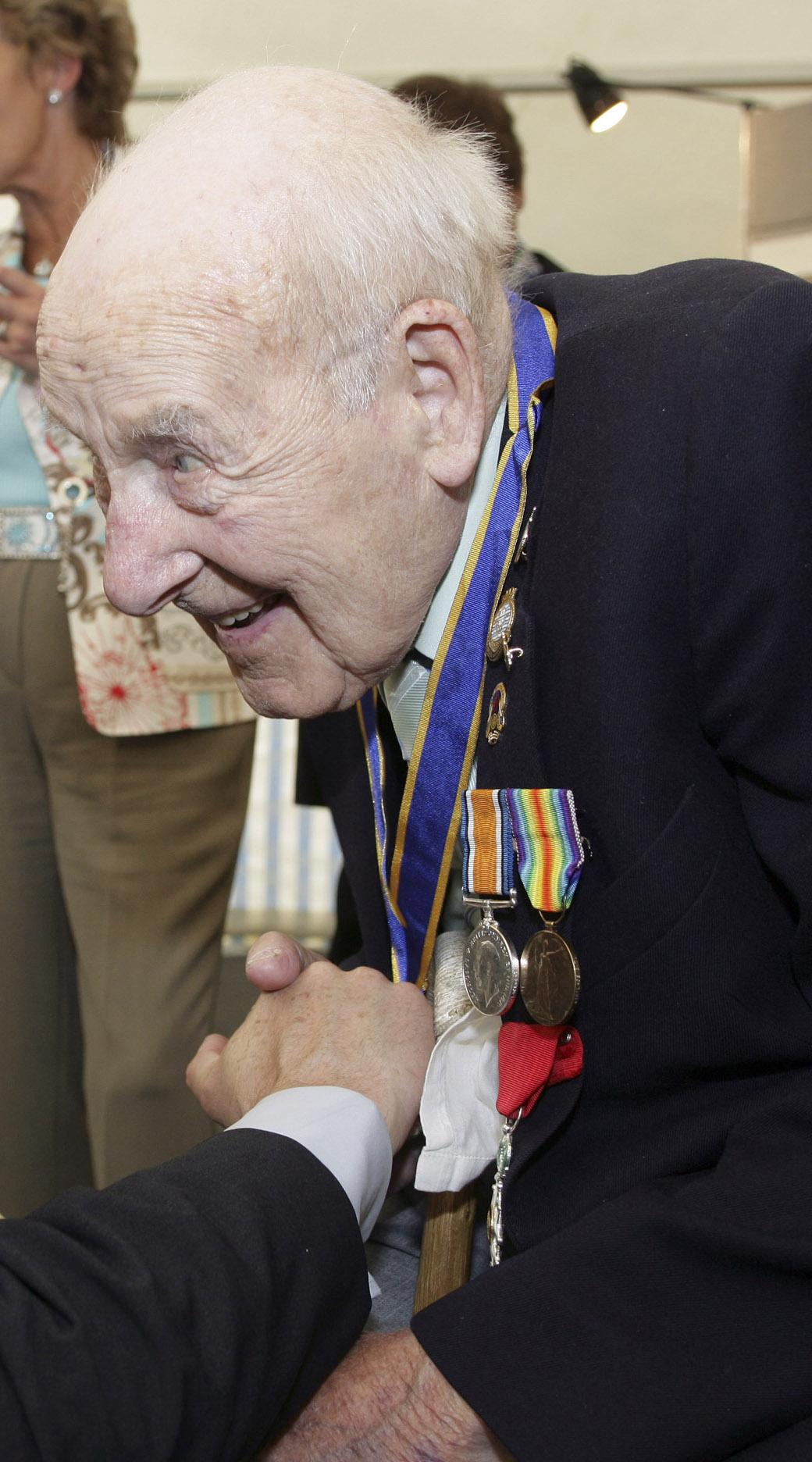
- Allingham at age 110 in 2006
- Born: Henry William Allingham; 6 June 1896; Clapton, London, England
- Died: 18 July 2009 (aged 113 years, 42 days); Ovingdean, East Sussex, England
- Spouse: Dorothy Cator (m. 1918; died 1970)
- Children: 2
- Military career
- Allegiance: United Kingdom
- Branch: Royal Navy; Royal Air Force
- Service years: August 1915 – 16 April 1919
- Rank: Rigger Aero, Aircraft Mechanic First Class
- Units: Royal Naval Air Service, RNAS Great Yarmouth; No. 12 Squadron RNAS; Aircraft Depot, Dunkirk
- Conflicts: World War I; Battle of Jutland; Western Front
- Awards: Freedom of the town of Eastbourne; Freedom of the Town of Saint-Omer; Freeman of Brighton and Hove; Officer Légion d'honneur British War Medal; Victory Medal; Gold Medal of Saint-Omer
- Other work: Ford Motor Company

Henry William Allingham (6 June 1896 – 18 July 2009) was an English supercentenarian. He is the longest-lived man ever recorded from the United Kingdom, a First World War veteran, and, for one month, was the verified oldest living man in the world. He is also the second-oldest military veteran ever.

Allingham was the oldest-ever surviving member of any of the British Armed Forces, and one of the last surviving veterans of the First World War. He was the last survivor of the Battle of Jutland, the last-surviving member of the Royal Naval Air Service (RNAS), and the last-surviving founding member of the Royal Air Force (RAF). In 2001, he became the face of the First World War veterans' association and made frequent public appearances to ensure that awareness of the sacrifices of the First World War was not lost to modern generations. He received many honours and awards for his First World War service and, towards the end of his life, his longevity.

== Early life ==
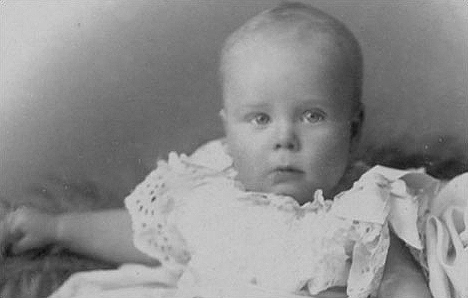
Allingham as an infant in 1896

Allingham was born on 6 June 1896 in Clapton, County of London. When he was 14 months old, his father, Henry Thomas Allingham (1868–1897), died at age 29 of tuberculosis. Henry is recorded in the 1901 census with his widowed mother Amy Jane Allingham (née Foster) (1873–1914), a laundry forewoman, living with her parents and brother at 23 Verulam Avenue, Walthamstow. His mother remarried in 1905 to Hubert George Higgs and in 1907 the family moved to Clapham, London. Henry and his mother are recorded in the 1911 Census living at 21 Heyford Avenue, Lambeth, while his stepfather was lodging away from home working as a wheelwright. Henry attended a London County Council school before attending the Regent Street Polytechnic. Allingham remembered seeing the City Imperial Volunteers return from the Second Boer War, and also recalled watching W. G. Grace play cricket. On leaving school, Allingham started work as a trainee surgical instrument maker at St Bartholomew's Hospital. He did not find this job very interesting, and so left to work for a coachbuilder specialising in car bodies.

== First World War ==
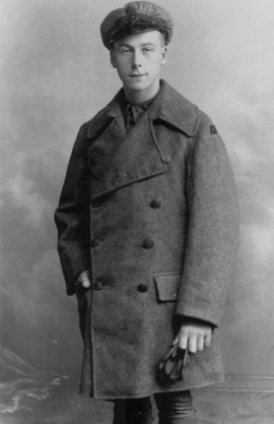
Allingham in RNAS uniform at age 20 in 1916

Allingham wanted to join the war effort in August 1914 as a despatch rider, but his critically ill mother managed to persuade him to stay at home and look after her. However, after his mother died the same year aged 41, Allingham enlisted with the Royal Naval Air Service (RNAS). He became formally rated as an Air Mechanic Second Class on 21 September 1915, and was posted to Chingford before completing his training at Sheerness, Kent. His RNAS serial number was RNAS F8317.

After graduation, Allingham was posted to the RNAS Air Station at Great Yarmouth where he worked in aircraft maintenance. On 13 April 1916, King George V inspected the air station and its aircraft. Allingham later reported disappointment at narrowly missing an opportunity to speak to the King.

Allingham also worked in Bacton, Norfolk, further up the coast, where night-flying was conducted and was later involved in supporting anti-submarine patrols. A typical patrol would last two or three days and would involve hoisting a seaplane in and out of the water by means of a deck-mounted derrick.

During the preparations for the Battle of Jutland, Allingham was ordered to join the naval trawler HMT Kingfisher. Onboard was a Sopwith Schneider seaplane that was used to patrol the surrounding waters for the German High Seas Fleet. Kingfisher had been the first trawler to be equipped with a seaplane, in May 1915. Allingham's responsibilities included helping to launch this aircraft. Although the Kingfisher was not directly involved in the battle (she shadowed the Grand Fleet and then the High Seas Fleet), Allingham still rightfully claimed to be the last known survivor of that battle and could recall "seeing shells ricocheting across the sea."

In September 1917, Allingham, by then an Air Mechanic First Class, was posted to the Western Front to join No. 12 Squadron RNAS. This unit acted as a training squadron for other RNAS squadrons based on the Western Front. There is also some evidence that the squadron was involved in combat operations. When Allingham arrived at Petite-Synthe, both the Royal Flying Corps (RFC) and the RNAS were involved in the Ypres offensive. On 3 November 1917, he was posted to the aircraft depot at Dunkirk, France, where he remained for the rest of the war, on aircraft repair and recovery duties. He recalls being bombed from the air and shelled from both the land and the sea.

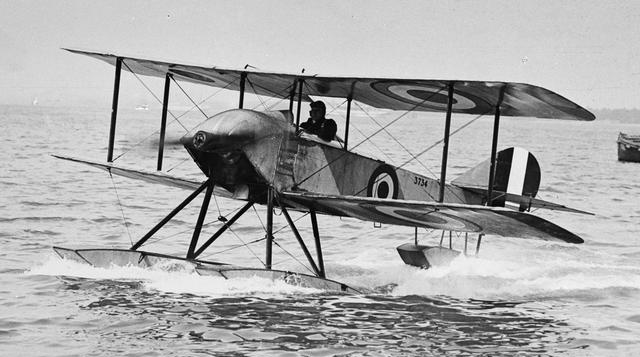
Sopwith Schneider

He transferred to the Royal Air Force when the RNAS and the RFC were merged on 1 April 1918. The creation of the Royal Air Force did not initially have a big impact on Allingham and he later remarked that at that time he still considered himself a navy man. In the RAF he was ranked as a Rigger Aero, Aircraft Mechanic Second Class and was given a new service number: 208317. Allingham returned to the Home Establishment in February 1919 and was formally discharged to the RAF Reserve on 16 April 1919. During the last few years of his life Allingham was recognized as the last surviving founding member of the RAF. Speaking with Dennis Goodwin of the First World War Veterans' Association, Allingham said, "It is a shock as well as a privilege to think that I am the only man alive from that original reorganisation when the RAF was formed."

== Inter-war years ==
=== Career ===
In addition to his military service as a mechanic, Allingham spent the vast majority of his professional life as an engineer. His employers included Thorns Car Body Makers, Vickers General Motors and H.J.M. Car Body Builders. He started his longest stretch of employment in 1934 designing new car bodies for the Ford Motor Company at their Dagenham plant which had opened only a few years previously in 1931.

=== Family life ===
Allingham met Dorothy Cator (1898–1970) in Great Yarmouth, Norfolk in 1918. They married the same year in Romford, when she was 21 and he was 23. They moved to Eastbourne, Sussex in 1961 and remained married until she died there in 1970 from acute and chronic lymphatic leukaemia. They had two daughters, Betty (1920–2023) and Jean (1923–2001). Jean emigrated to the United States after she married a US WWII veteran soldier and died aged 78 in 2001.

At the time of his death Allingham had 7 grandchildren, 16 great-grandchildren, 14 great-great-grandchildren and 1 great-great-great-grandchild.

== Second World War ==
During the Second World War, Allingham was in a reserved occupation and worked on a number of projects. Perhaps his most significant contribution was the design of an effective counter-measure to the German magnetic mines. During his Christmas lunch in 1939 he was called away to help design a system that would neutralise the mines and open the port of Harwich, Essex. Nine days later, he had successfully completed the task.

== Later life ==
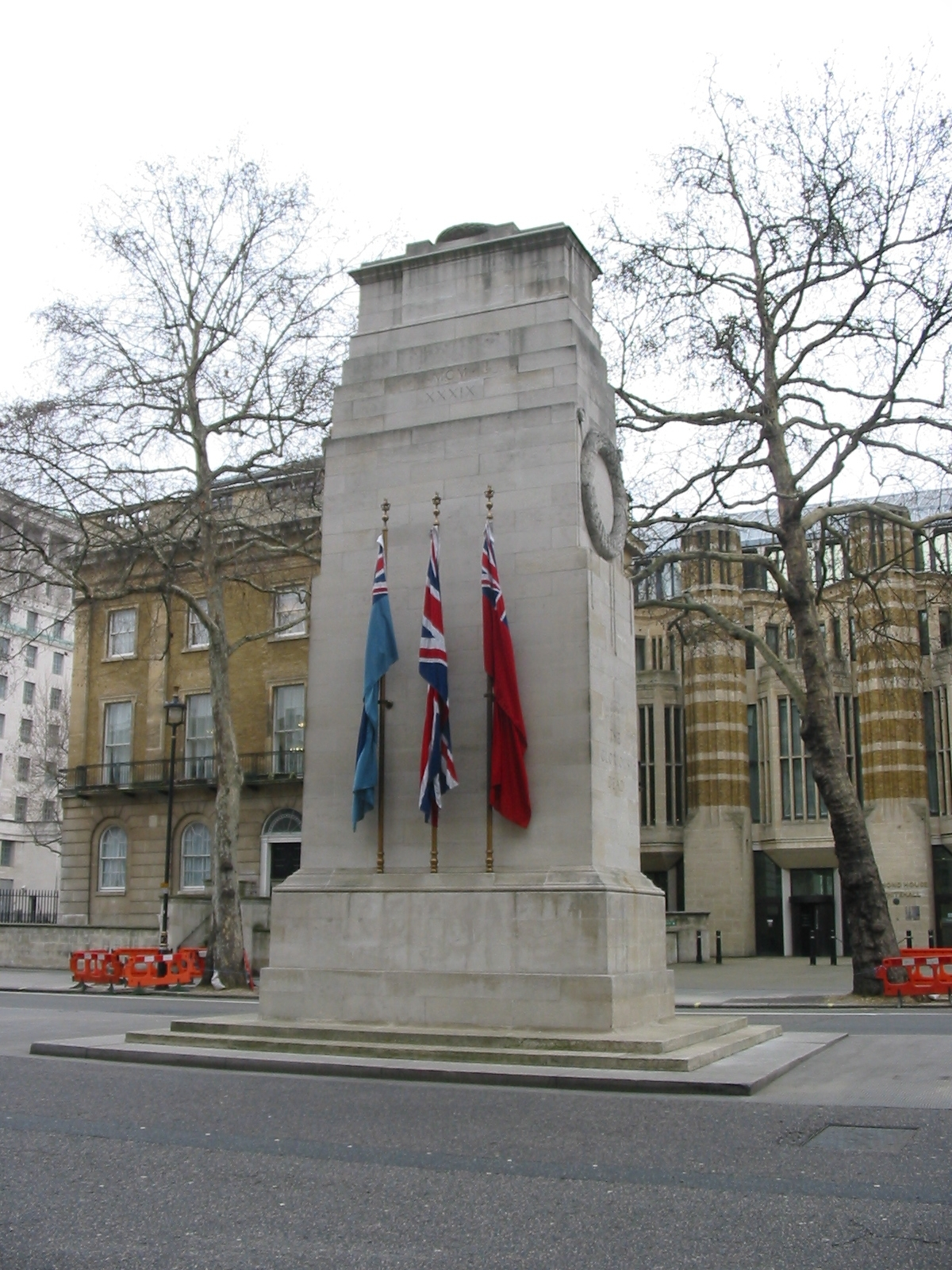
The Cenotaph in London at which Allingham attended ceremonies on 4 August 2004 and 11 November 2008, marking the 90th anniversary of the start and end of World War I respectively

After the Second World War Allingham continued to work for Ford until he retired in 1961. After Denis Goodwin of the First World War Veterans' Association tracked him down in 2001, a 105-year-old Allingham took a prominent role in telling his story so that later generations would not forget. On 16 October 2003, he helped launch the 2003 Royal British Legion Poppy Appeal with model Nell McAndrew aboard the cruiser HMS Belfast. He was quoted as saying "[The veterans] have given all they have got for the country ... I owe them ... we all owe them."

A ceremony at The Cenotaph in Whitehall, London on 4 August 2004, marked the 90th anniversary of Britain's entry into the First World War. Allingham attended, together with three other First World War veterans, William Stone, Fred Lloyd and John Oborne. Allingham also marched past the Cenotaph on Remembrance Sunday in 2005 and laid wreaths at memorials in Saint-Omer on Armistice Day. That was the last time a First World War veteran marched past the Cenotaph and it marked the end of an era. No First World War veterans were present at the Cenotaph for the 2006 Remembrance Sunday Parade.

As the last surviving member of the RNAS, and the last living founding member of the RAF, Allingham was an honoured guest when the British Air Services Memorial was unveiled at Saint-Omer on 11 September 2004. During the ceremony, Allingham was given the Gold Medal of Saint-Omer, which marked the award of the Freedom of the Town. The group of RAF technical trainees that joined him at this ceremony continued to visit Allingham at his retirement home in Eastbourne.

In November 2005, Allingham accepted an invitation from the International Holographic Portrait Archive to have his holographic portrait taken. His image was recorded for posterity in December 2005. At the same time, an exhibition was being planned for London's floating naval museum on board HMS Belfast, entitled the Ghosts of Jutland. A copy of this portrait was donated to the museum and the Duchess of Gloucester unveiled the portrait to mark the opening of the exhibition.

Allingham was awarded the freedom of his home town of Eastbourne by the mayor on 21 April 2006. He lived in his own home until May 2006 when, one month before his 110th birthday and with failing eyesight, he moved to Blind Veterans UK (formally known as St Dunstan's), a charity for blind ex-service personnel, at Ovingdean, near Brighton. Aside from his poor eyesight, he was reportedly in good health.

Allingham attended the 1 July 2006 commemorations at the Thiepval Memorial to the Missing. He did not attend the 2006 Remembrance Day parade on 11 November at the Cenotaph as he was in France at a wreath-laying ceremony and to receive the Freedom of The Town of Saint-Omer. He did, however, launch the Eastbourne Poppy Appeal before leaving for this trip.

On 18 April 2007 Allingham visited Wilnecote High School in Tamworth, Staffordshire to answer students' questions about the First World War, after they wrote to the few surviving veterans asking them about their experiences. In October 2007 he was honoured at the Pride of Britain Awards. Between his 110th and 111th birthdays Allingham made over 60 public appearances, including a visit to The Oval on 5 June 2007, the day before his 111th birthday, where he was wheeled around the boundary in front of the spectators.

On his 111th birthday in June 2007, a Royal Marines band played to Allingham on board HMS Victory before he returned with friends and relatives to the Queen's Hotel on the Portsmouth seafront for afternoon tea. Asked how it felt, Allingham replied, "I'm pleased to be seeing another tomorrow. It's just the same as it was as at any age, it's no different. I'm happy to be alive and I'm looking forward to the celebrations. I never imagined I'd get to 111."

On 1 April 2008, the 90th anniversary of the establishment of the Royal Air Force, Allingham was a guest of honour at the celebratory events at RAF Odiham in Hampshire. By then, Allingham was the only surviving founder member of the RAF.

Allingham celebrated his 112th birthday with members of his family at RAF Cranwell, Lincolnshire as the guest of honour at a luncheon at the college. During the day, the Battle of Britain Memorial Flight performed a flypast, which was followed by an aerobatic display from two Tutor aircraft. In June 2008, as part of the National Veterans' Day celebrations, Allingham was given a guided tour of the Eurofighter Typhoon aircraft at BAE Systems in Warton, Lancashire.

On 23 September 2008, Allingham launched a book about his life, co-written by Denis Goodwin, with an event at the RAF Club in London. On 11 November 2008, marking the 90th anniversary of the end of the First World War, together with Harry Patch and Bill Stone, Allingham laid a commemorative wreath for the Act of Remembrance at The Cenotaph in London. This would prove to be the last such event attended by surviving veterans of the conflict, as all three men died within the next year.

Allingham was invested as a Scout on 18 November 2008, 100 years after he first joined as a youth. He said he was only able to spend six weeks with his local group as a boy. Allingham celebrated his 113th birthday on HMS President, at an event hosted by the Royal Navy. He received a signed birthday card from First Sea Lord Sir Jonathon Band and saw a Mark 8 Royal Navy Lynx flying overhead while he was sitting outside in his wheelchair.

in 2009 the artist Dan Llywelyn Hall sat with Allingham at St Dunstan's for a portrait. The painting entitled 'The Last Volunteer' which was exhibited in London in the year of Allingham's death

When asked the secret of his long life, Allingham said, "I don't know, but I would say, be as good as you possibly can."

== Oldest living man ==
Allingham credited "cigarettes, whisky and wild, wild women – and a good sense of humour" for his longevity.

Allingham was the oldest living man in England for several years. Official recognition by Guinness World Records came in January 2007. On 8 February 2007, when 110-year-old Antonio Pierro died, Allingham became the oldest known living veteran of the First World War, and the third-oldest living man in the world.

Allingham overtook George Frederick Ives as the longest-lived member of the British Armed Forces on 2 November 2007. He was therefore the longest-lived British First World War veteran to date.

Following the death of Tomoji Tanabe on 19 June 2009, Allingham became the oldest living man. At his death, he was the oldest living veteran of the First World War, but not the longest lived member of any armed force in any conflict; this record is held by Emiliano Mercado del Toro of Puerto Rico, who also served during the First World War.

He was also the first ever British man to reach the verified age of 113.

On 18 July 2009, Allingham died of natural causes aged 113 years and 42 days.

As the number of First World War veterans dwindled, calls grew to give the last remaining veteran a state funeral. The calls resulted in Her Majesty's Government approving on 27 June 2006 a National Memorial Service at Westminster Abbey to take place after the death of the last known British First World War veteran. Before this announcement Allingham often said that he tried not to think about the prospect, but has also been quoted as saying "I don't mind — as long as it's not me." Allingham received a letter from Member of Parliament Tom Watson on 14 July 2006 explaining the reasoning for a national memorial service rather than a state funeral, as the intention is to commemorate the entire generation that fought in the war rather than single out an individual.

In Harry Patch's book The Last Fighting Tommy, the author claims that Allingham planned to leave his body to medical science. In his own book, Kitchener's Last Volunteer, Allingham confirmed that he was intending to leave his body to medical science. However he was persuaded by Denis Goodwin to change his mind, as he became a symbol of World War I to remind people of the sacrifices made during the conflict. To that end, he agreed to a funeral and cremation.

== Awards ==
One of the generation who sacrificed so much for us all.

— Queen Elizabeth II

=== War medals and awards ===
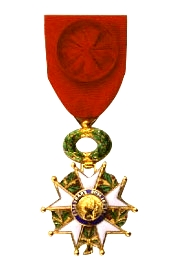
The Officier Légion d'honneur. Awarded to Allingham in 2009.

Allingham was awarded four medals, two of which were medals from the First World War. The Gold Medal of Saint-Omer was awarded to Allingham on 11 September 2004 when he was given the Freedom of the Town of Saint-Omer. He was also awarded France's highest military honour, the Légion d'honneur, in which he was appointed a chevalier in 2003 and promoted to officier in 2009. The remaining two medals are British Campaign Medals from the First World War: the British War Medal and the Victory Medal; those two medals are colloquially known as "Mutt and Jeff". These two medals are replacement medals supplied by the Ministry of Defence after discovering at a recent cenotaph parade that Allingham's original campaign medals were destroyed during the Blitz of the Second World War.

=== Honorary awards ===
As well as the above-mentioned decorations, Allingham won several awards and honorary memberships. Examples include the Pride of Britain award, and a position as an honorary member of the Fleet Air Arm Association.

Although not formally qualified he was recognised by the Institute of Mechanical Engineers (IMechE) who presented him with a Chartered Engineer award on 19 December 2008.

Allingham had the following to say about the award:

Since entering the engineering profession I always hoped to become a chartered engineer, but when I was younger we just couldn't afford it. It's something I never thought would happen for me, so to receive this honorary certificate from IMechE is a lifetime's goal finally realised. I am very grateful to the Institution for presenting me with the award.

This was followed on 22 May 2009 with the award of an honorary doctorate in engineering at the Southampton Solent University by the university's chancellor, the former First Sea Lord Alan West, for his contribution to Britain and its allies during two world wars and his continuing charity work, especially connected with veteran servicemen and women.

== Death and funeral ==
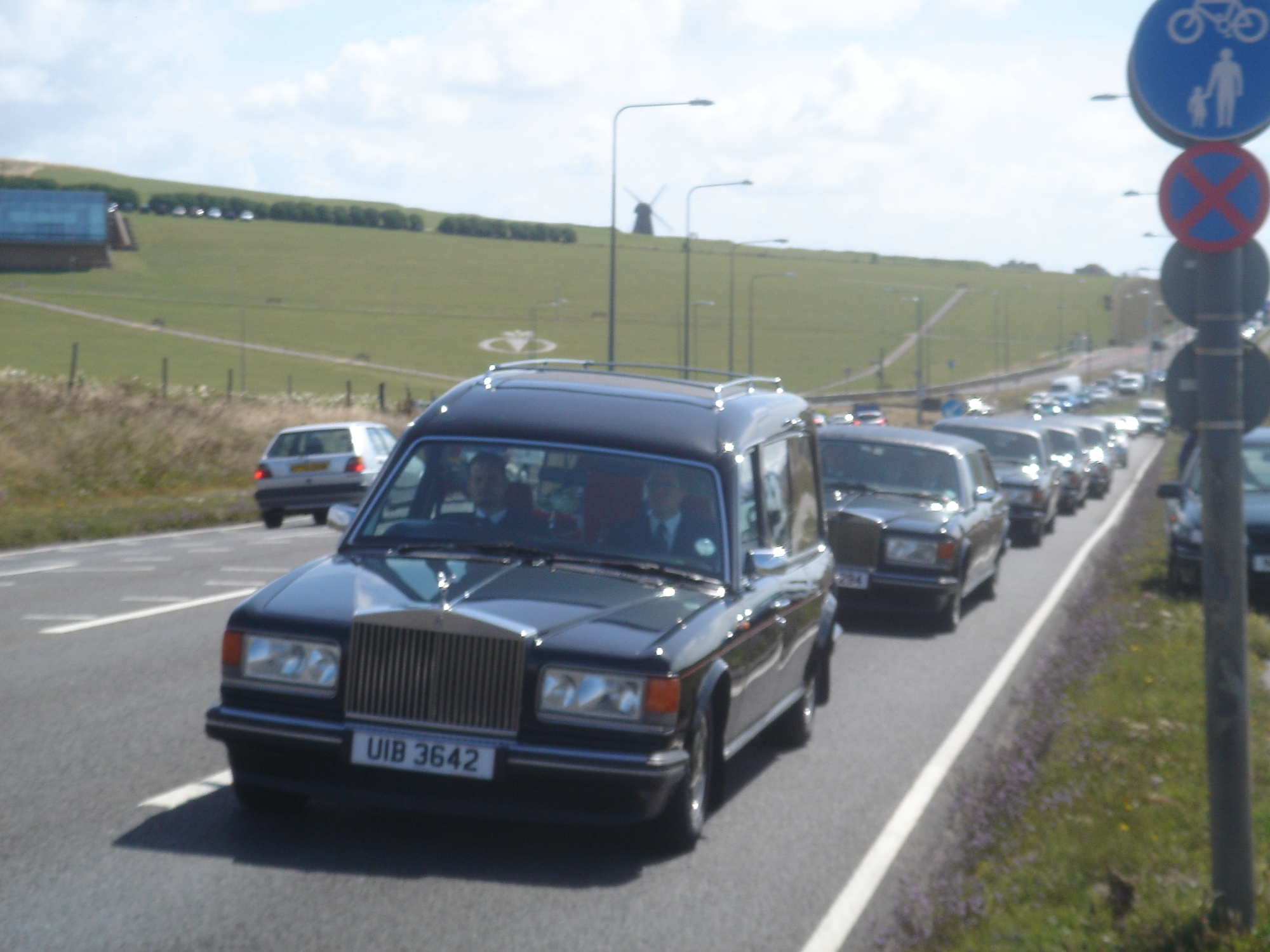
Henry Allingham's funeral cortège leaving St Dunstan's en route to St Nicholas' Church

Allingham died of natural causes in his sleep at 3:10 am on 18 July 2009 at his care home, Blind Veterans UK centre in Ovingdean near Brighton, aged 113 years and 42 days. After his death, Walter Breuning succeeded him as the world's oldest man.

Allingham's funeral took place at St Nicholas' Church, Brighton at noon on 30 July 2009, with full military honours. His coffin was carried by three Royal Navy seamen and three RAF airmen. The service was preceded by a half-muffled quarter peal on the church's bells, rung by local ringers and members of the RAF and Royal Navy change ringing associations. Among the mourners were the Duchess of Gloucester, representing the Queen, and Veterans' Minister Kevan Jones. Senior Royal Navy and Royal Air Force officers, including Vice-Admiral Sir Adrian Johns and Air Vice-Marshal Peter Dye, represented the two services of which Allingham had been a member. Allingham's surviving daughter, Betty Hankin, 89, attended the funeral, with several members of her family. The funeral was followed by a flypast of five replica First World War aircraft; British and French buglers played the Last Post and Reveille; and a bell was tolled 113 times, once for each year of his life.

The BBC commissioned Carol Ann Duffy, the Poet Laureate, to write a poem to mark the deaths of Allingham and fellow First World War supercentenarian Harry Patch, who died one week after Allingham on 25 July 2009. The result, "Last Post", was read by Duffy on the BBC Radio 4 programme Today on the day of Allingham's funeral. A tree was planted, and a commemorative plaque unveiled, at the Eastbourne Redoubt on 22 May 2010 to mark Allingham's residence in the town.

== See also ==
- List of British supercentenarians
- Florence Green, last surviving veteran of the World War I Women's Royal Air Force
- List of the oldest people by country
- List of the verified oldest people
- List of last surviving World War I veterans
