= Houthulst =

- Municipality
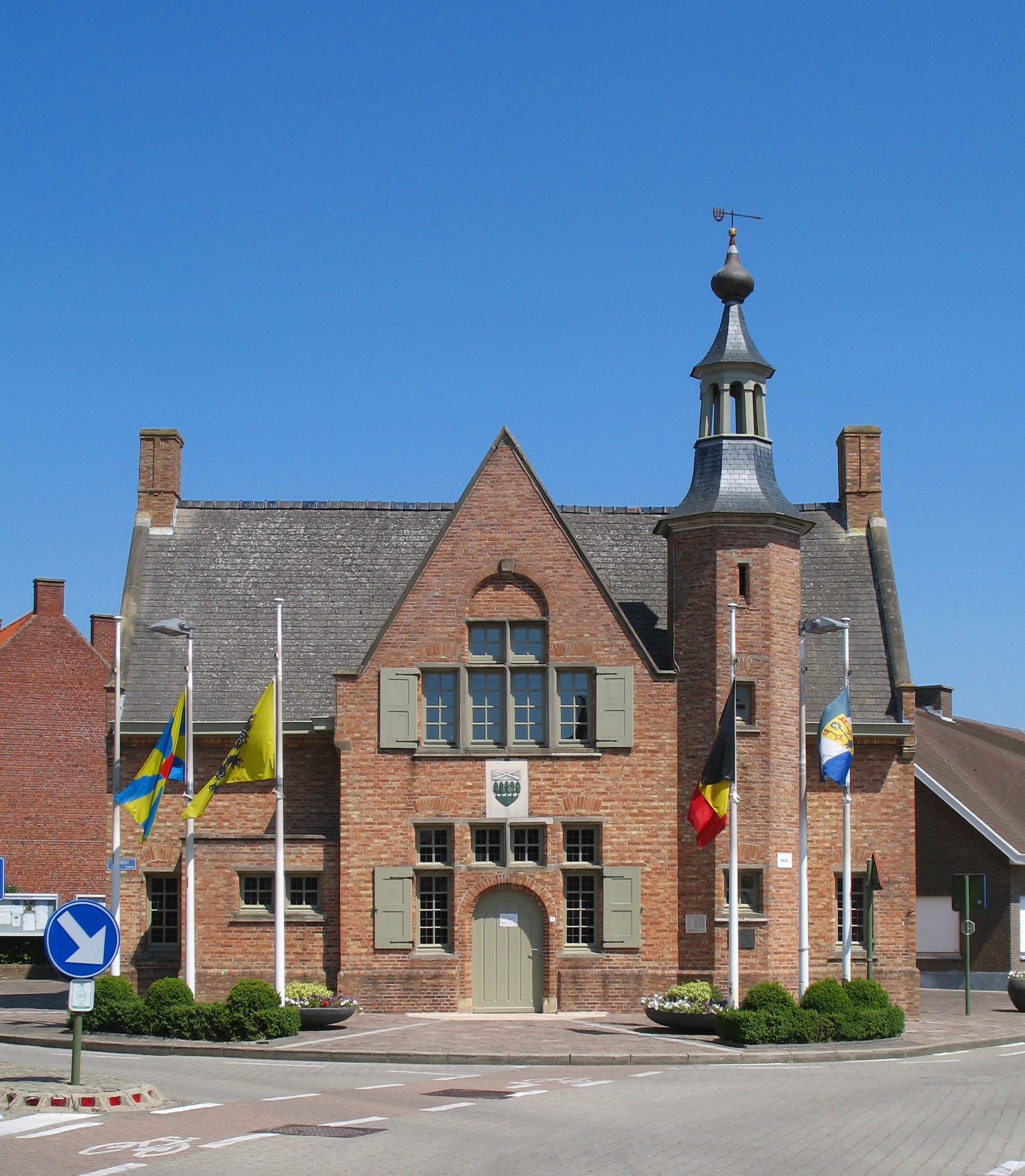
- Houthulst town hall

- Flag Coat of arms

- Location of Houthulst in West Flanders
- Interactive map of Houthulst
- Location in Belgium
- Coordinates: 50°59′N 02°57′E
- Country: Belgium
- Community: Flemish Community
- Region: Flemish Region
- Province: West Flanders
- Arrondissement: Diksmuide

Government
  - Mayor: Jeroen Vandromme (CD&V)
  - Governing parties: CD&V, Vooruit

Area
  - Total: 56.02 km^{2} (21.63 sq mi)

Population (2018-01-01)
  - Total: 10,032
  - Density: 179.1/km^{2} (463.8/sq mi)
- Postal codes: 8650
- NIS code: 32006
- Area codes: 051
- Website: www.houthulst.be

Houthulst (Dutch pronunciation: [ˈɦʌutɦʏlst]; West Flemish: Oetulst, pronounced [ˈutœːst]) is a municipality in the Belgian province of West Flanders. The municipality consists of the sub-municipalities Houthulst, Jonkershove, Klerken and Merkem. On 1 January 2006, Houthulst had a total population of 9,051. The total area is 55.89 km² which gives a population density of 162 inhabitants per km².

== Landmarks ==
- The Sint-Jan Baptistkerk (Church of Saint John the Baptist) is the church of Houthulst. It was rebuilt in 1924 after being completely destroyed during World War I.
- The Belgian Military Cemetery, containing the graves of almost 1800 Belgian soldiers killed during World War I. The cemetery also contains 81 Italian graves. Most of the soldiers who have been buried here were killed during the final assault on the Germans on 28 September 1918, to liberate the Vrijbos forest.

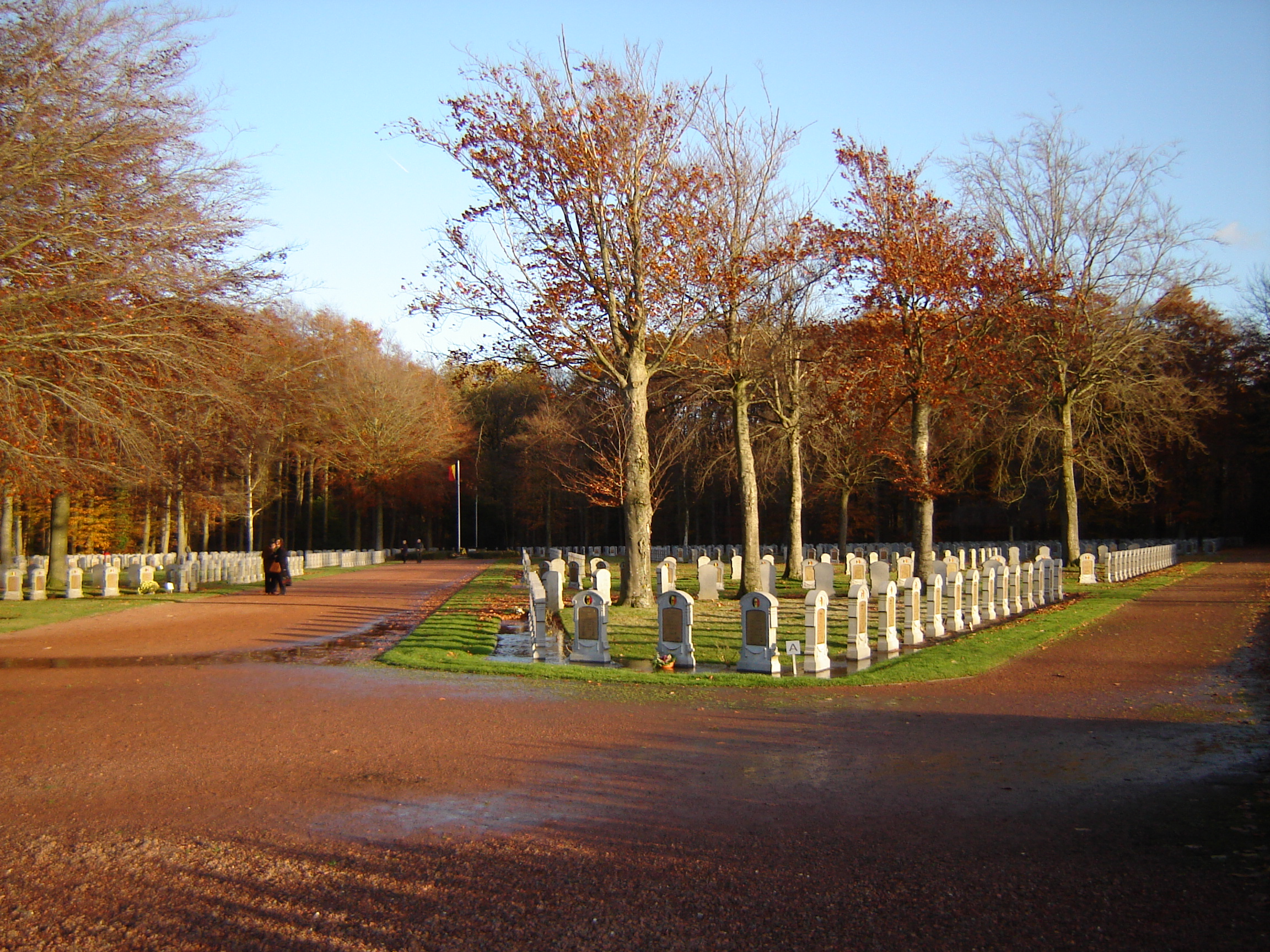
Houthulst – Military Cemetery
