= Robley Rex VA Medical Center =

American healthcare organization

Coordinates: 38°16′14″N 85°41′51″W

Robley Rex VA Medical Center is a hospital located in Louisville, Kentucky, and administered by the Veterans Health Administration, an agency of the United States Department of Veterans Affairs. The center is dedicated to the care of veterans of the United States military living in a 32-county service area in Kentucky and Southern Indiana.

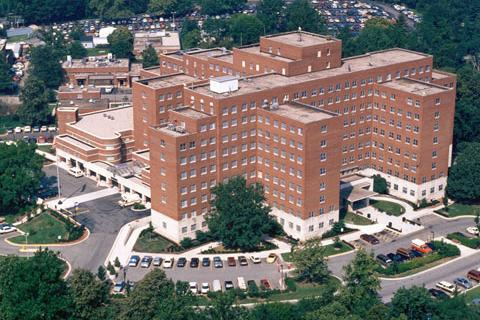
Photo of Robley Rex Veterans Affairs Medical Center

The hospital first opened in 1952, with a construction cost of $8 million, almost double the original cost projection, and was built on the site of a former city reservoir on a hill above Zorn and Mellwood avenues, near the Ohio River. It replaced the Nichols U.S. Army General Hospital, the largest hospital in Louisville during World War II. Originally known only as the Louisville Veterans Hospital, the hospital was given its current name in 2010 to honor Robley Rex, a World War I-era veteran and VA volunteer. While the hospital originally opened as a full-service hospital with 494 beds, as of 2024 the facility is listed only as a short-term acute care facility with no staffed beds. In 2022, the hospital received Level 1 Geriatric Emergency Department Accreditation (GEDA) from the American College of Emergency Physicians, the highest possible rating. Current services offered include primary care, mental health care, specialty care, and social programs and services.

In November 2021, ground was broken for a replacement VA hospital in Louisville. The new hospital, located on Brownsboro Road, just off of Interstate 264, is expected to have 104 beds, as well as a women's health clinic, at a projected cost of $840 million. Construction is expected to be complete by early 2026.
