= Netherwood Hughes =

British World War I veteran (1900–2009)

- Born: 12 June 1900; Great Harwood, Lancashire, England
- Died: 4 April 2009 (aged 108); Clayton-le-Moors, Lancashire, England
- Military career
- Allegiance: United Kingdom
- Branch: British Army
- Service years: June–November 1918
- Nickname: Ned
- Unit: 51st Manchester Regiment
- Conflicts: First World War
- Other work: Mechanic

Netherwood "Ned" Hughes (12 June 1900 – 4 April 2009) was one of the last two Tommies who served the United Kingdom during the First World War, along with Harry Patch, although Patch was the only one to have seen action. Hughes was also one of three British veterans still living in the country, with Patch and Henry Allingham being the other two. The Ministry of Defence has not confirmed his war service, but many First World War service records were destroyed in the Blitz during the Second World War.

However, the World War I Veterans Association invited him to the Cenotaph for the 90th Anniversary of the Armistice in November 2008. He did not attend as his family felt that the journey would be too much for him.

== Biography ==
Netherwood Hughes was born in Great Harwood on 12 June 1900, the fourth of seven children born to optician John Hughes and his wife Robina. He had three brothers: Charlie, Henry, and Sidney, who served in the Royal Navy on HMS Albion. Hughes spent most of his working life as a mechanic and driver and, in June 1918, he was called up, like every other driver in Great Britain, to perform that role in the British Army. While he was still in training the war ended, and he returned home to drive in a mill. He later became a bus driver. Hughes married twice, but never had any children, although in his final years he was frequently visited by his nephews and nieces and their families at his care home, Woodlands Home for the Elderly in Clayton-le-Moors, where he spent most of his time in the grounds, smoking his pipe.

When receiving a birthday card from the Queen each year since his 100th birthday, he commented: "She has the same frock on".

In his final few weeks, Ned's health deteriorated and he had difficulty speaking for a week before his death, according to his niece, Ann Hutton. He died of natural causes on 4 April 2009, aged 108, at Woodlands. Speaking to the Accrington Observer, Mrs Hutton said, "It’s not the family’s wishes for a military funeral. We don’t want bugles and whistles, we just want a simple family affair. He couldn’t stand any fuss on his birthdays."

== See also ==
- List of last surviving World War I veterans
