= Wallace Pike =

Last Newfoundland WWI veteran (1899–1999

- Born: Wallace Howard Pike; 22 December 1899; Jamestown, Newfoundland Colony
- Died: 18 April 1999 (aged 99); Bay Roberts, Newfoundland, Canada
- Spouse: Minnie Pretty
- Children: 10
- Military career
- Allegiance: Newfoundland
- Branch: British Army
- Rank: Private
- Unit: Royal Newfoundland Regiment
- Conflicts: World War I
- Awards: Legion of Honour

Wallace Howard Pike (22 December 1899 – 18 April 1999) was a Newfoundlander and Canadian military veteran and Salvation Army officer. He was the last known Newfoundland World War I veteran.

== Early life and military service ==
Pike was born in Jamestown, Bonavista Bay to Henry Pike and Ida Pike (née Oldford). In 1917, during the First World War, he enlisted as private #3662 in the Newfoundland Regiment as an underage soldier. Pike felt pressured to enlist despite being underage as he did not want to be "called a coward by the local girls." He saw action on the Western Front as a stretcher-bearer where he was wounded twice, once in the leg and once in the hand. Pike had retained the rank of private at the end of his military service in 1919. Upon being discharged, he found work as a clerk for the Ayre and Sons merchant firm in St. John's.

== Salvation Army work and commemorations ==
Pike joined the Salvation Army in 1921 to train as an officer, and he was initially sent to the corps in Famish Cove (today Fairhaven), Placentia Bay. He would later tell the Canadian Broadcasting Corporation (CBC) that he wanted to help save his fellow man after having been trained to kill them. As a Salvation Army officer, Pike oversaw the construction of schools and citadels in many of his postings in rural Newfoundland, including Deer Lake, Gambo, Moreton's Harbour, and Springdale. He eventually retired in 1964 with the rank of brigadier while stationed in Whitbourne.

Pike was the last living military veteran who fought in the Royal Newfoundland Regiment in World War I. He was honoured by Newfoundland Premier Brian Tobin as a veteran who "represented what would later become a Canadian tradition in times of conflict—that of humanitarian and life-saver." In November 1998, France awarded Pike its highest accolade, the Legion of Honour. In bestowing the award to Pike, French Ambassador Denis Bauchard stated "[t]hrough your courage you sealed forever the eternal bonds of friendship, solidarity and affection between our two countries."

Pike died on 18 April 1999 at the age of 99, just one month after the deaths of Newfoundland World War I veterans Jesse Brinson and Alexander White.

== See also ==
- List of last surviving World War I veterans by country
