= National Service Medal (United Kingdom) =

Ribbon of the National Service Medal

The National Service Medal is an unofficial commemorative medal sold by Award Productions Ltd. and co-sponsored by the Royal British Legion. The medal is intended to recognise those who served as National Service conscripts for the United Kingdom between 1939 and 1960. Some of the proceeds from sale of the medals goes to the poppy appeal. As it is not an official medal it should not be worn.

== Description ==
It features a lion and a Britannia figure on one side and servicemen on the other. The coloured bands on the ribbon represent the colours of the Union Jack and the Royal British Legion.
