= Florence Green =

Last surviving veteran of World War I (1901–2012)

- Born: Florence Beatrice Patterson; 19 February 1901; Edmonton, Middlesex, England
- Died: 4 February 2012 (aged 110 years, 350 days) North Lynn, Norfolk, England
- Allegiance: United Kingdom
- Branch: Royal Air Force; the Women's Royal Air Force
- Service years: 1918–1919
- Conflicts: World War I
- Spouse: Walter Green (m. 1920; died 1975)
- Children: 3

Florence Beatrice Green (née Patterson; 19 February 1901 – 4 February 2012) was an English woman who is thought to have been the last surviving veteran of the First World War from any country. She was a member of the Women's Royal Air Force.

== Biography ==
Florence Green was born at Edmonton, Middlesex, to Frederick and Sarah Patterson (née Neal). She joined the Royal Air Force; the Women's Royal Air Force, on 13 September 1918 at the age of 17, where she served as an officers' mess steward, service number 22360. She worked in the officers' mess at RAF Marham and was also based at Narborough airfield.

In 1920, she moved to King's Lynn. She married Walter Green (1893–1975), who was a station worker and a veteran of both World Wars; Walter died in 1975 after 55 years of marriage. They had three children: May (born 1921), Bob (born 1926), and June Evetts (born 1935). She lived in King's Lynn with May until November 2011, when she moved into a care home. In January 2010, she was publicly identified as the oldest living female veteran of the First World War.

On 19 February 2011, she celebrated her 110th birthday, becoming a supercentenarian—one of just 10 living in the United Kingdom, all of whom were women. With the death of Claude Choules on 5 May 2011, Green became the last known living veteran of the First World War. On 20 July 2011, the Gerontology Research Group verified her age, and listed her as an official supercentenarian.

It was reported that when asked what it felt like being 110, she replied, "Not much different to being 109." At the time of her death, Green had three children, four grandchildren, and seven great-grandchildren. Before her death on 4 February 2012, aged 110 years and 350 days, she was West Norfolk's oldest resident, the second-oldest person in Norfolk, and the sixth-oldest in the United Kingdom.

== Florence Fields ==
In January 2023, the Borough Council of King's Lynn and West Norfolk and housing developer Lovell Partnerships Ltd announced that a housing development of 226 houses in Gaywood, formally known as Parkway, will be named Florence Fields in memory of Florence Green. The name was selected following a competition ran with King's Lynn Academy, a secondary school adjacent to the development site.

== See also ==
- List of last surviving veterans of military insurgencies and wars
- List of last surviving World War I veterans
