= Franz Künstler =

German centenarian

- Born: 24 July 1900; Sósd, Austria-Hungary
- Died: 27 May 2008 (aged 107); Bad Mergentheim, Germany
- Military career
- Allegiance: Austria-Hungary; Hungary
- Service years: February 1918–1921, 1942
- Unit: Mounted Artillery Regiment
- Conflicts: World War I World War II
- Other work: Museum guide

Franz Künstler (Hungarian: Künstler Ferenc; 24 July 1900 – 27 May 2008) was, at age 107, the last known surviving veteran of the First World War who fought for the Austro-Hungarian Empire. Following the death of 110-year-old Ottoman veteran Yakup Satar on 2 April 2008, he was also the last Central Powers veteran of any nationality. He was born in Sósd, in the Kingdom of Hungary, now Măureni, Romania.

== Military career ==
A Banat Swabian, Künstler enlisted in the Austro-Hungarian Army at Szeged in February 1918 in a field artillery regiment (HFKR 5. k.u. Feldkanonen-Regiment/ - 5. honvéd tábori ágyúsezred). He saw combat on the Italian Front on the Piave River. Following the collapse of the Austro-Hungarian Empire, he fought against the communists in Hungary, and was a soldier until 1921. During the Second World War, he served six months in 1942 as a mobile courier in Ukraine.

Following World War II, Künstler lived in Niederstetten, West Germany, and worked as a guide in a museum until his death. He had been expelled from Hungary by the communist government, as had many other ethnic Germans.

Asked about his nationality, Künstler said he always felt connected to the German nation and saw himself as a German. He was a Hungarian citizen until 1946, when he obtained German citizenship. In an interview given at the age of 107 to an Austrian magazine, Künstler was asked about "the most important thing in life". He answered: "I was a handsome man and had many women. But more important is to have a good wife, with whom one can share one's life."

== Death ==
With the February 2008 death of 107-year-old Georg Thalhofer, who had been physically unfit for World War I service, Künstler became the oldest living man in Germany. He died of complications from intestinal surgery in Bad Mergentheim after having fallen ill while visiting his native Hungary.

== See also ==
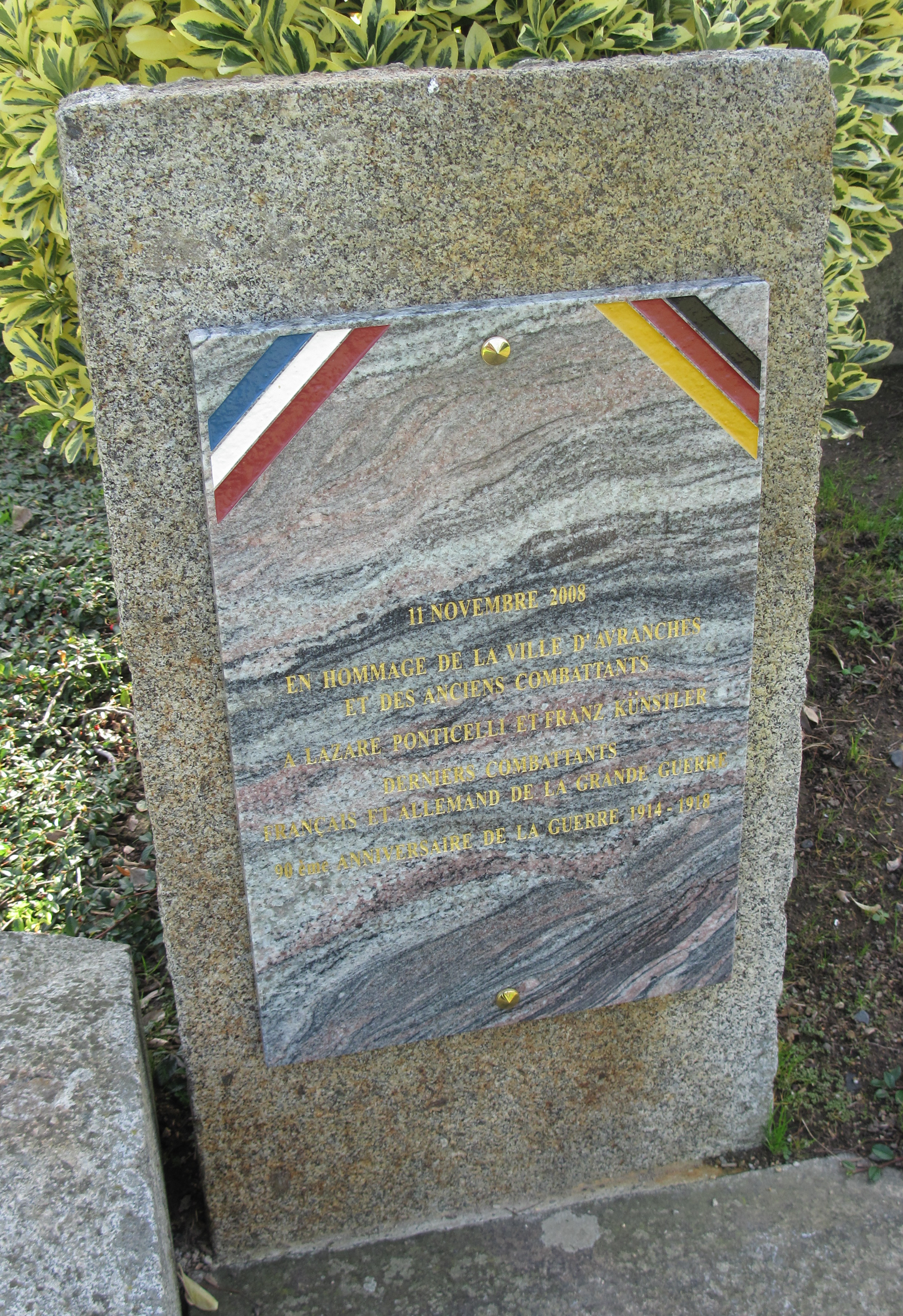
Plaque to Franz Künstler and Lazare Ponticelli in Avranches. The plaque displays the German national colours and describes Künstler as "German", despite his having fought for Austria-Hungary.

- List of last surviving World War I veterans

Records
| Preceded by Georg Thalhofer (107) | Germany's Oldest Living Man; 4 February 2008 – 27 May 2008 | Succeeded by Georg Rosenkranz (107) |
