= Paul Ooghe =

Belgian WWI veteran (1899–2001)

- Born: 17 May 1899; Laeken, Belgium
- Died: 8 September 2001 (aged 102); Anderlecht, Belgium

Paul Ooghe (17 May 1899 – 8 September 2001) was a Belgian soldier who, and at the time of his death, was incorrectly believed to be the last surviving Belgian soldier to have seen combat in World War I. The actual last surviving veteran, Cyrillus-Camillus Barbary, who had emigrated to the United States, died in 2004.

== World War I service ==
In 1916, he escaped from German-occupied Belgium and traveled to the Netherlands, England, and finally France to join the Belgian Army which was fighting at a northern section of the Western Front known as the Yser Front. Ooghe lied about his age and enlisted at 16. He served with the 5th Lancers Regiment and later the 1st Grenadiers Regiment.

As he was in charge of the maintenance of the telephone and telegraph lines, Ooghe was often in the front line, also involved in action. At the end of March 1917, he participated in an attack against a German bunker in Rekkem and was very nearly killed. On 11 November 1918, while on duty and eager to celebrate the armistice, the Germans bombarded the positions where Ooghe was stationed and ten of his companions perished before the bugle sounded the end of the conflict. This was a traumatic experience that Ooghe would not forget.

== Post War activities ==
Ooghe was a recipient of numerous honors and awards and was until his death often regarded as the last living Belgian survivor of World War I. He was a regular participant in the annual commemorations of the war and was often willing to speak at length about his experiences and the futility of conflict. His aim was to infuse a civic sense in young people, as well as the importance of keeping the memory of the conflict alive.

== Death ==
Ooghe died on 8 September 2001 due to weakness after having suffered from bronchitis for several months. He was 102 years old. Up until a short time before his death, he was widely announced as being the last surviving Belgian World War I veteran. The last Belgian veteran of the war, Cyrillus-Camillus Barbary, died in the United States in 2004.
