= North Lynn =

Coordinates: 52.765°N 0.413°E

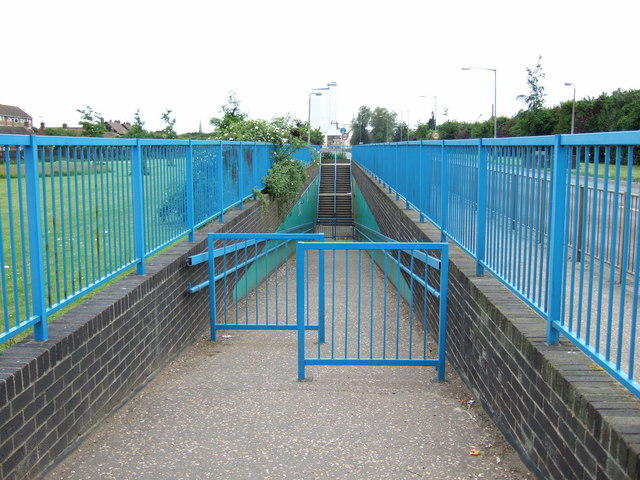

- Location within Norfolk
- District: King's Lynn and West Norfolk
- Shire county: Norfolk
- Region: East
- Country: England
- Sovereign state: United Kingdom
- Post town: King's Lynn
- Postcode district: PE30
- Dialling code: 01553
- UK Parliament: North West Norfolk

North Lynn is an urban residential area of King's Lynn, in the King's Lynn and West Norfolk district of Norfolk, England.

There are three main parks in North Lynn: Peck's field (named after the previous owner of the land before the North Lynn estate was created), The Rec (RECreation Ground) and Colombia Park. North Lynn has one junior school, one primary school and one infant school, respectively: St Edmund's Junior School, St Edmund's (Foundation Community) Primary School, and Highgate Infant School. Some children go to Eastgate Primary instead of St Edmond's (Foundation Community).

North Lynn also has two large ponds popular with anglers. These are collectively known as the "long ponds", and were created as reserves of fresh water in case of emergency.

== Civil parish ==
In 1931 the parish had a population of 91. On 1 April 1935 the parish was abolished to form Kings Lynn.
