= Claude Choules =

British-born World War I veteran (1901–2011)

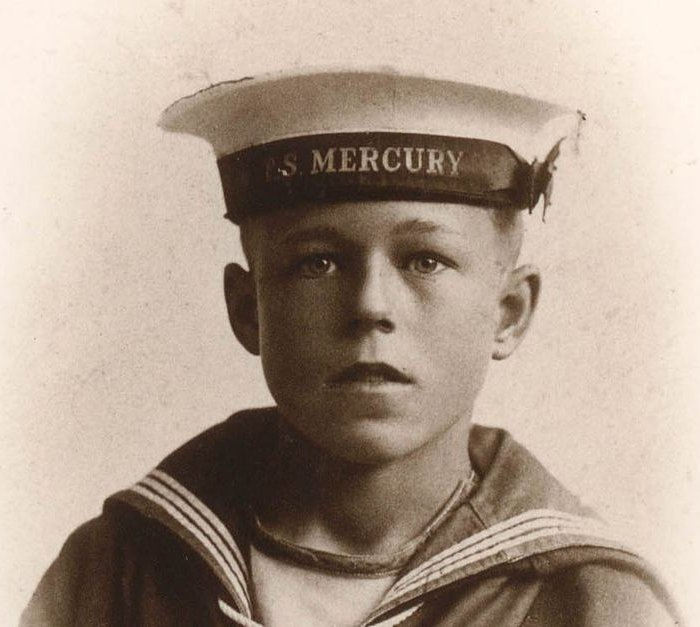
- Claude Choules, aged 14 in 1915
- Born: 3 March 1901; Pershore, Worcestershire, England
- Died: 5 May 2011 (aged 110 years, 63 days); Salter Point, Perth, Western Australia, Australia
- Military career
- Allegiance: United Kingdom; Australia
- Branch: Royal Navy (1915–26); Royal Australian Navy (1926–56)
- Service years: 1915–1956
- Rank: Chief Petty Officer
- Conflicts: First World War; Atlantic Campaign; Second World War; Pacific War
- Awards: British War Medal; Victory Medal Ribbon; War Medal (1939–1945) UK Ribbon; Australian Service Medal (1939–1945) Ribbon; Queen Elizabeth II Coronation Ribbon; Centenary Medal; Australian Defence Medal; Naval Long Service and Good Conduct Medal

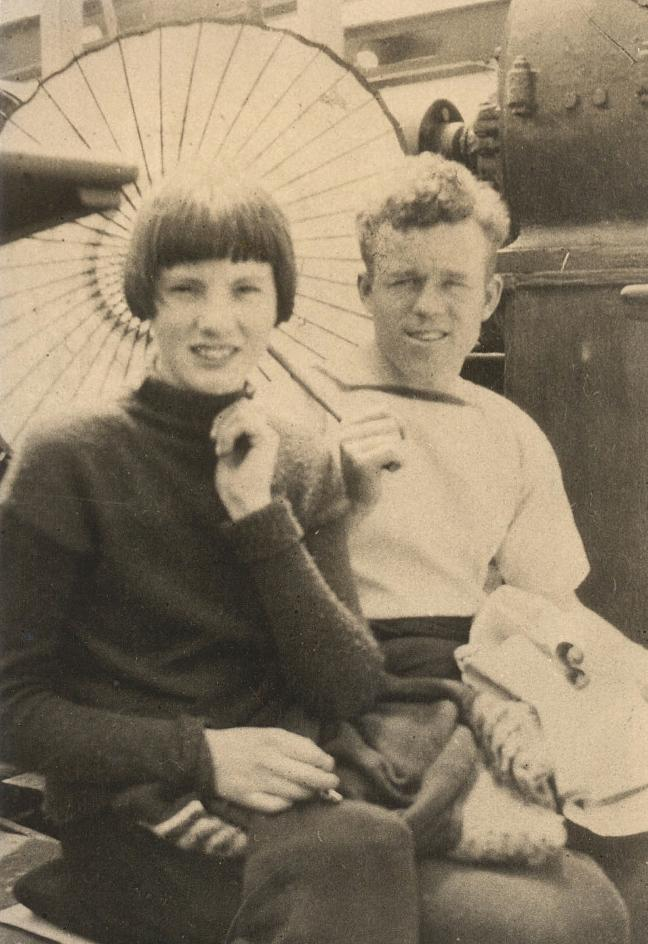
Choules and his future wife Ethel Wildgoose, aboard Diogenes, 1926. They were married for 76 years until her death aged 98.

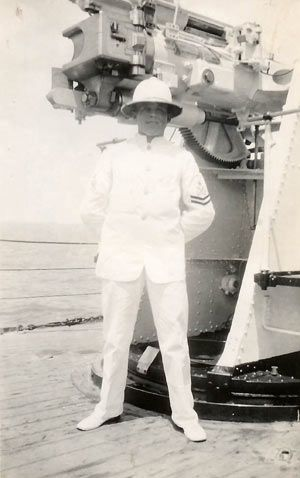
PO Choules aboard HMAS Canberra, 1929

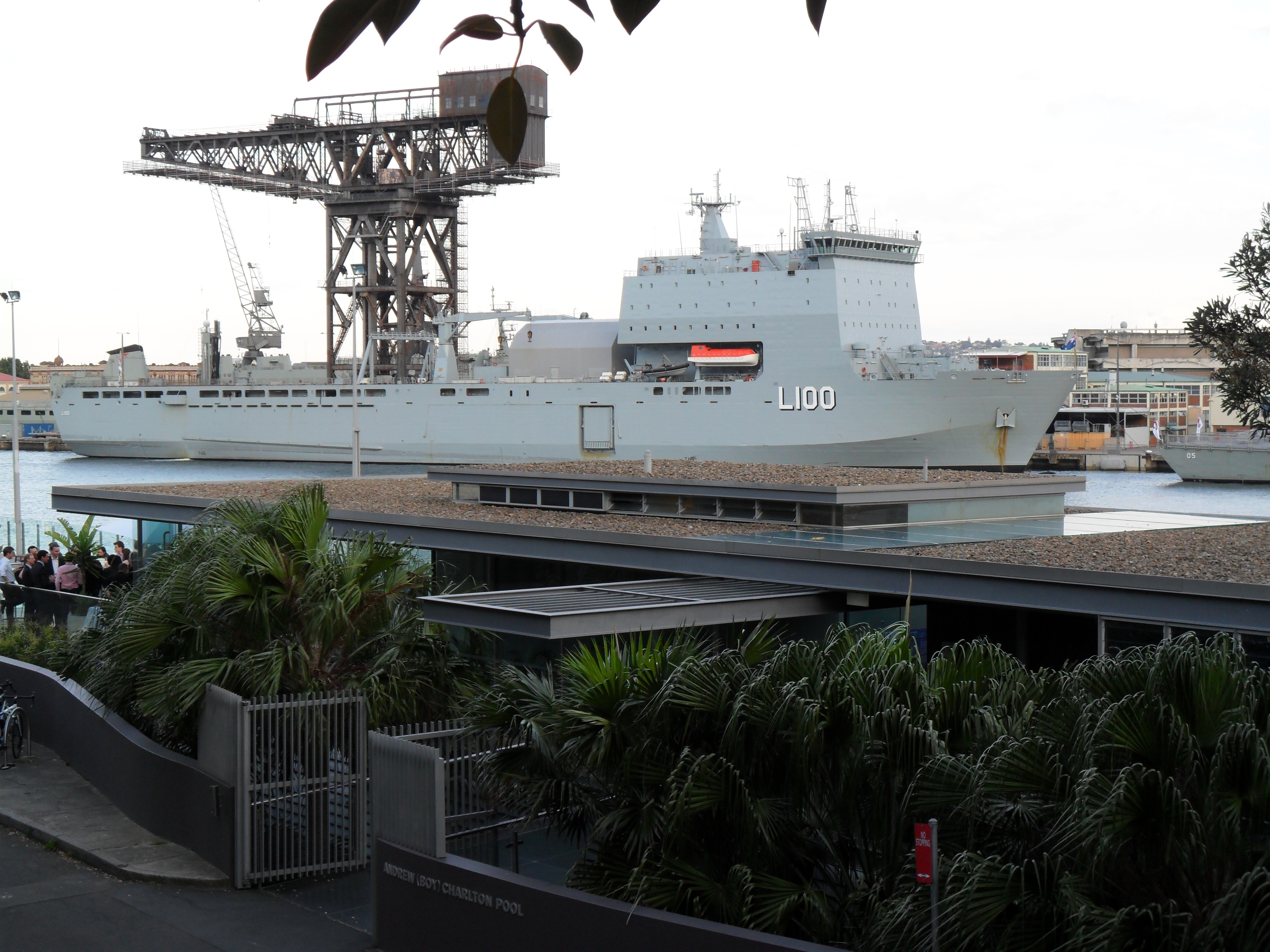
HMAS Choules in December 2011

Claude Stanley Choules (/ʃuːlz/; 3 March 1901 – 5 May 2011) was a British-born military serviceman from Pershore, Worcestershire, who at the time of his death was the oldest combat veteran of the First World War. He served with the Royal Navy from 1915 until 1926. After having emigrated to Australia he served with the Royal Australian Navy, from 1926 until 1956, as a chief petty officer and was a naturalised Australian citizen. He was the last surviving military witness to the scuttling of the German fleet at Scapa Flow in 1919 and the last surviving veteran to have served in both world wars. At the time of his death, he was the third-oldest verified military veteran in the world and the oldest known living man in Australia. He was the seventh-oldest living man in the world. Choules became the oldest man born in the United Kingdom following the death of Stanley Lucas on 21 June 2010. Choules died at the age of 110 years and 63 days. He had been the oldest British-born man; following his death, that honour went to the Reverend Reginald Dean. In December 2011, the landing ship HMAS Choules was named after him, only the second Royal Australian Navy vessel named after a sailor.

== Early life ==
Claude Choules was born in Bridge Street, Pershore, Worcestershire, on 3 March 1901, and raised in the nearby village of Wyre Piddle. The son of Harry and Madeline (née Winn, known as Madge), Claude was one of seven children, although two died in early childhood. The surviving siblings were Douglas (born 1893), Henry Leslie (known as Leslie, born 1894), Phyllis (born 1899) and Madge Gwendoline (known as Gwendoline, born 1904). His mother left home when Claude was five, returning to the stage as an actress, and he and his older brothers were raised by his father. At the time of his mother's departure from the family, Claude was told that she had died and he never saw her again. His older sister Phyllis lived with the family of a paternal uncle, while his younger sister Gwendoline was adopted by the family of a paternal aunt, who lived in Pewsey, Wiltshire. Claude and his older brothers went to Pershore National Boys' School, though Douglas and Les emigrated to Western Australia in 1911.

Choules was 13 on the outbreak of the First World War, and the family received letters from Douglas and Leslie who had joined the Australian Imperial Force and landed at Anzac Cove during the Gallipoli Campaign. Choules was able to leave school when he turned 14, at which point he attempted to enlist in the army as a bugler boy but was rejected as he was too young.

== Naval training ==
Choules's father then arranged for him to train to join the navy instead, and in April 1915, at age 14, he joined the nautical training ship TS Mercury.

This training ship was moored on the River Hamble, near Southampton, Hampshire, and had a dormitory ship called HMS President that had previously been HMS Gannet. The commander of the Mercury training site was the cricketer C. B. Fry, and Choules's time there included trips to Netley Hospital as part of the Mercury's dancing team. The examinations taken by Choules following his training on the Mercury qualified him to attend the advanced class on the naval training ship HMS Impregnable situated at the Devonport naval base in Plymouth. Choules transferred there on 10 October 1916, for what was to be the final stage of his training before joining the Royal Navy's Grand Fleet.

== Naval service ==
On 20 October 1917 Choules joined the battleship Revenge, which was the flagship of the First Battle Squadron stationed at Scapa Flow in the Orkney Islands. While serving aboard, Choules saw action against German zeppelins, and witnessed the surrender of the German Imperial Navy at the Firth of Forth in 1918, ten days after the Armistice, as well as witnessing the scuttling of the German fleet at Scapa Flow.

In 1926, along with 11 other Royal Navy senior sailors, Choules travelled to Australia on loan as an instructor at Flinders Naval Depot. He travelled aboard Diogenes on a six-week voyage from London to Melbourne, and it was on this voyage that he met his future wife Ethel Wildgoose, who was travelling to Australia to work for the Victoria League. Choules decided to transfer permanently to the Royal Australian Navy (RAN) after sampling and agreeing with the Australian way of life.

He took his discharge from the RAN in 1931, but remained in the reserves and rejoined the RAN in 1932 as a chief petty officer torpedo and anti-submarine instructor. He never returned to England after leaving.

During the Second World War, Choules was the acting Torpedo Officer at HMAS Leeuwin, the naval base at Fremantle, Western Australia, and also served as the Chief Demolition Officer on the western side of the Australian continent. He was tasked with sabotaging Fremantle harbours and related oil storage tanks in the event of a Japanese invasion. Choules was also responsible for dealing with the first German mine to wash up on Australian soil during the war, near Esperance, Western Australia.

Choules remained in the RAN after the Second World War and transferred to the Naval Dockyard Police (NDP) to allow him to remain in service until 1956, as retirement from the RAN for ratings in those days was at age 50, while personnel could serve until 55 years old in the NDP.

== Personal life ==
Choules and his wife Ethel were married for 76 years, until her death in 2003 at the age 98. Choules shunned celebrations of the Armistice, because he was against the glorification of war. His autobiography The Last of the Last was first published in Perth in 2009, followed by an annotated edition for UK readers in 2010.

On 6 August 2009, although almost blind and deaf, he was still mentally active and gave a television interview.

In late April 2010, Choules's daughter Daphne Choules-Edinger reported that his health was declining and he was unlikely to give any further interviews. He celebrated his 110th birthday in March 2011. In the final years of his life, he resided at Gracewood Hostel in Salter Point, a suburb of Perth.

== Media appearances ==
Claude Choules appeared in the BBC documentaries The Last Tommy (2005) and Harry Patch – The Last Tommy (2009). After his death, Australian Prime Minister Julia Gillard stated, "Mr Choules and his generation made a sacrifice for our freedom and liberty we will never forget".

== Death and funeral ==
Choules died on 5 May 2011. He was survived by 3 children, 11 grandchildren, 22 great-grandchildren and 3 great-great-grandchildren. He was given a naval funeral in Fremantle, Western Australia on 20 May 2011. Guests included the West Australian Premier Colin Barnett, state Opposition Leader Eric Ripper and federal Defence Minister Stephen Smith, who gave a reading during the service. Choules's son Adrian gave the eulogy.

On 13 December 2011, the former Royal Fleet Auxiliary landing ship Largs Bay was commissioned into the Royal Australian Navy as HMAS Choules. The decision to name the ship after Claude Choules came about because of his status as the last surviving veteran of World War I; the naming recognises the service of enlisted sailors as part of celebrations of the navy's centenary (the ship is only the second vessel named after a sailor), and also acknowledges the ship's previous service under British control (Choules served in both the Royal Navy and the Royal Australian Navy during his career).

Choules was the last surviving male veteran of World War I and the last surviving veteran who saw active service. His death left Florence Green (19 February 1901 – 4 February 2012) as the last surviving veteran.

== Legacy ==
On 10 April 2014, after a campaign by a distant relative, the Pershore Town Council agreed to honour Choules by naming a street ("Choules Close") after him, in recognition of the fact that he was born in Bridge Street in the centre of the town.

== Awards ==
In November 2009, Choules became the oldest recipient of the Australian Defence Medal. (The medal was established in 2006 to recognise members of the Australian Defence Force who have served for more than four years after 3 September 1945).

He was also awarded the British War Medal 1914–18, the Victory Medal 1914–18, the War Medal 1939–45, the Australia Service Medal 1939–45, the Queen Elizabeth II Coronation Medal, the Centenary Medal and the Royal Navy Long Service and Good Conduct Medal with Clasp.

British War Medal	
Victory Medal 1914–18	
War Medal 1939–45	
Australia Service Medal 1939–45	
Queen Elizabeth II Coronation Medal	1953
Centenary Medal	2001
Australian Defence Medal	2009
Royal Navy Long Service and Good Conduct Medal	with clasp to denote 30 years' service

== See also ==
- List of last surviving World War I veterans
- List of Australian supercentenarians
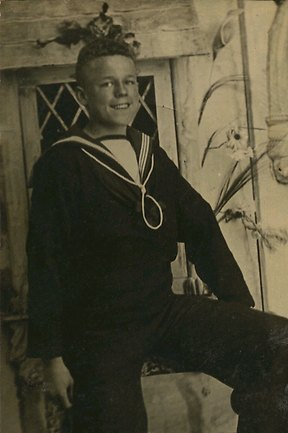
1917

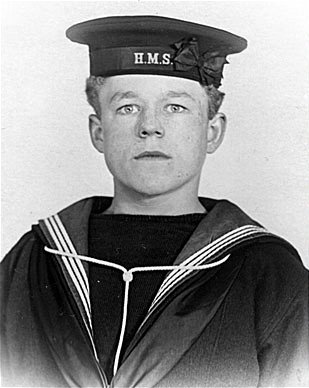
1918

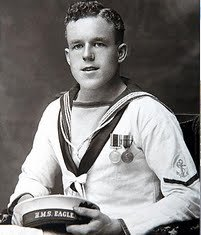
c. 1925

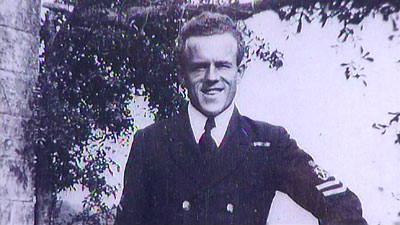
c. 1935

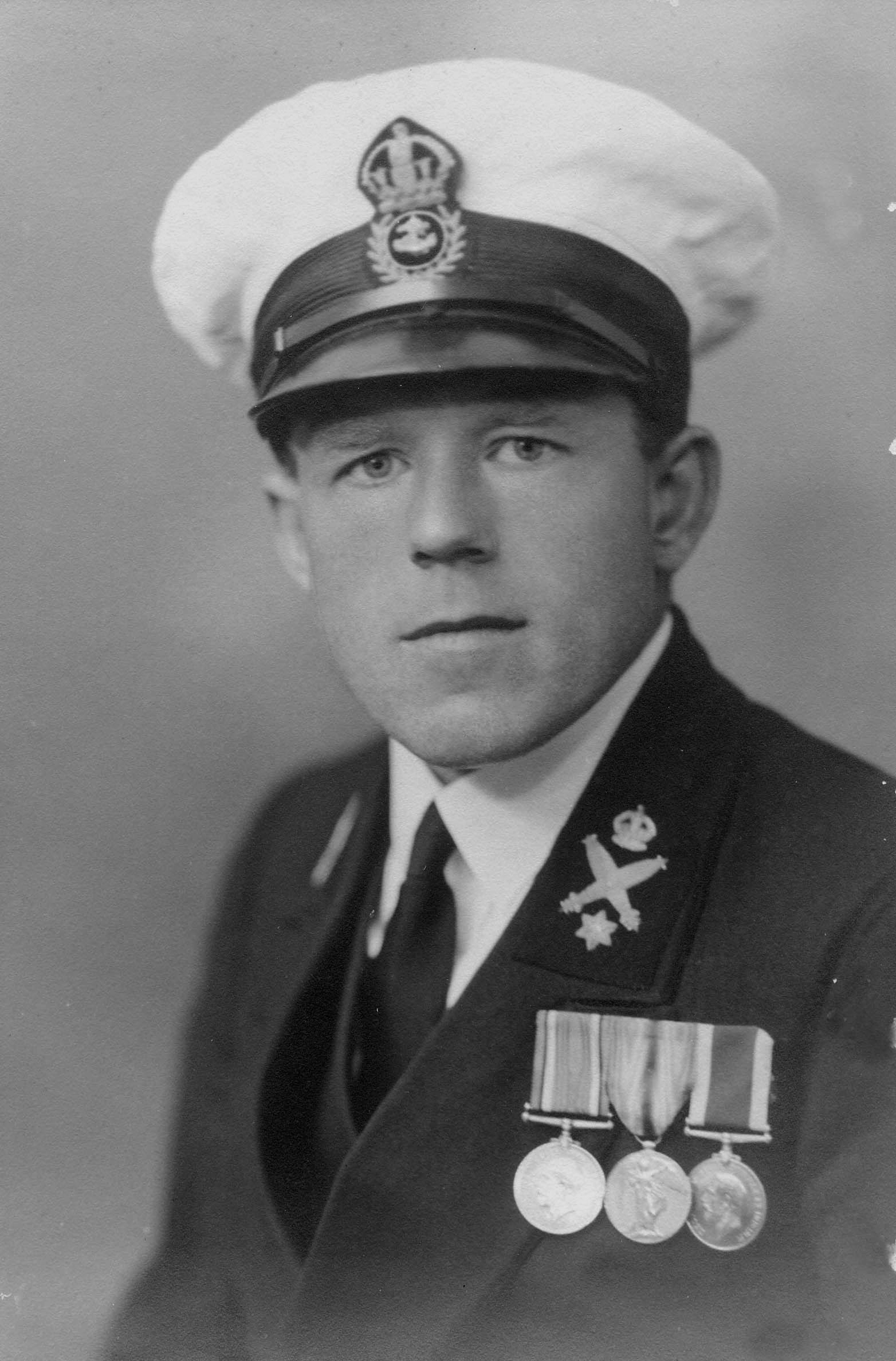
1936
