= Grenadian involvement in the world wars =

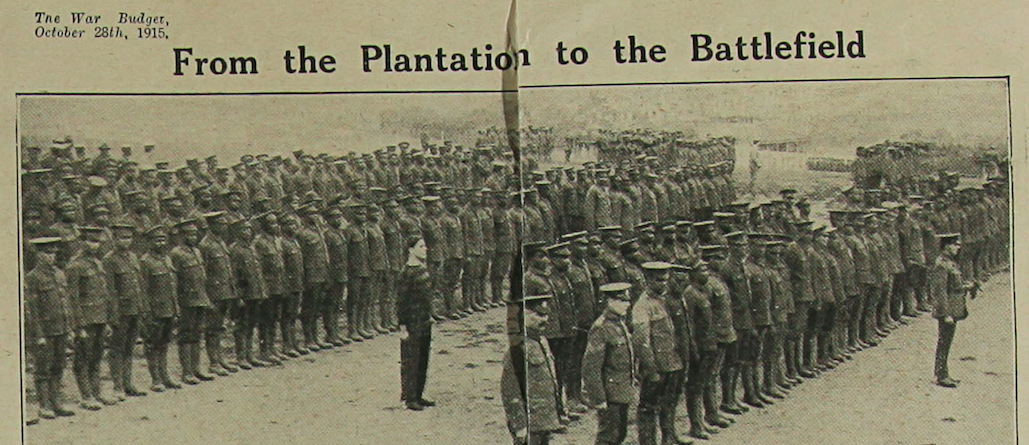
Caribbean British West Indies Regiment troops in Egypt

During World War 1 and World War 2, Grenada was a colony of the British Empire. While no fighting took place on the islands during the two world wars, Grenada did contribute to the European and Middle Eastern theatres in each war, and often as part of the British West Indies Regiment (BWIR).

== Involvement in World War 1 ==
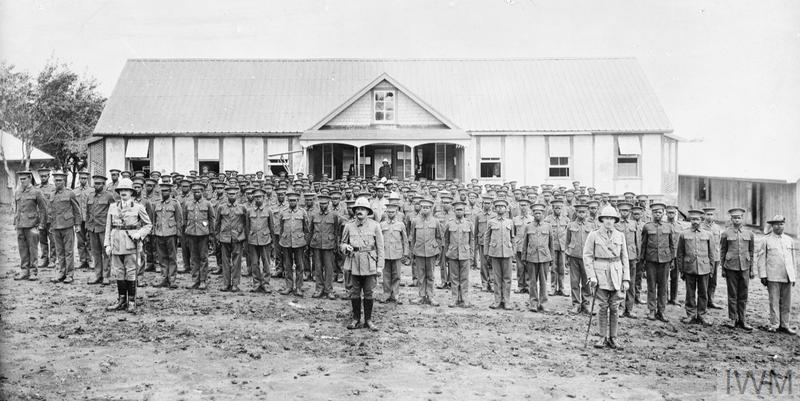
Grenadian troops of the British West Indies Regiment on parade

At the start of the War civil unrest occurred in Grenada due to fears of food shortages, however trade with other colonies and the increase in prices of nutmeg, cocoa and cotton caused the Grenadian economy to overall benefit from the war years.

At the start of the war 245 men immediately expressed interest in joining to fight; during the entirety of WW1, a total of 445 Grenadians (although 380 is also stated) aged between 14 and 40, left Grenada to serve in Europe, being assigned mainly to the British West Indies Regiment (BWIR). The Grenadian politician T. A Marryshow was one of the leading advocates of Grenadians fighting in the war, mainly to try and gain concessions for greater autonomy for Caribbean islands. Most of the Grenadian troops in WW1 served in the 1st Battalion, D Company made up of Grenadians and Barbadians, which served in the Sinai and Palestine campaign, from 1915 to 1918 against the Ottomans. They fought in battles such as the Battles of Gaza, Battle of Rumani and the Battle of Nablus. A further amount of Grenadians served in the Royal Navy and coastguard. Other groups of Grenadians served with the American and Canadian militaries as well. Most of the actual combat by the BWIR happened during the later years of the war, when rules on the use of Caribbean men in combat were relaxed. One of the most notable Grenadians in the BWIR was Tubal Uriah Butler, who later became a preacher and politician.

The colony of Grenada also sent produce, mainly chocolate (£6000 worth of chocolate) and money (£10,000 was sent from Grenada to aid the war effort), which were also sent by neighbouring islands such as Jamaica, Trinidad and St. Lucia.

=== Awards ===
Sgt. William E. Julien of the 1st Battalion BWIR in the Sinai and Palestine campaign: Awarded the Distinguished Conduct Medal for:

For gallantry and devotion to duty at Damieh Bridgehead, Jordan Valley, on the 22nd September, 1918. He commanded his platoon with the utmost efficiency in the attack on the bridgehead, and after the successful assault he reorganised his platoon and led them with great gallantry over the broken ground, which was still occupied by the enemy, capturing two machine guns and a number of prisoners.

— Soldier awards from the London Gazette 1898-1944, Page 2288

Acting Cprl. Stanley Maurice Sharpe of the 1st Battalion BWIR and later Second Lt. of the RFC/RAF in the Macedonian front: Awarded the Distinguished Flying Cross for:

His majesty the King has been graciously pleased to confer the Reward on this officer of the Royal Air Force, in recognition of gallantry in flying operations against the enemy:- A brave and capable officer who has carried out many valuable long distance reconnaissances with marked success, invariably displaying great keenness and courage.

— Soldier awards from the London Gazette 1898-1944, page 2046

Acting Warrant Officer Class 2 Terence Bertrand Comissiong of the BWIR in the East Africa Campaign: Awarded the Meritorious Service Medal.

Acting Colour Sgt. William Edward Julien of the 1st Battalion BWIR: Awarded the Distinguished Conduct Medal.

Second Lt. Dudley Arthur Anthony de Freitas of the South Lancashire Regiment, later Captain of the Gloucestershire Regiment, Royal Artillery and Guides Cavalry Frontier force in the Mesopotamian campaign: Awarded the General Service Medal.

=== Casualties ===
A total of 47 Grenadians were killed during the First World War, most of their names are memorialised at a memorial at Tanteen, St George’s (except for the grave of J. S. Mercurius who is buried at St George’s River road cemetery and other individuals buried in cemeteries in Europe and the Middle East), the names are:

List of Grenadians who died in the First World War at Tanteen, St George's War memorial
Column 1	Column 2
Sgt. O. Ferguson	Pte. L Francis
Sgt. C. Rennie	Pte. C. L. Francois
Cpl. G. F. De Pradines	Pte. A. Grant
Lcpl. O. Bertrand	Pte. J. Elcock
Pte. R. B. Andrews	Pte. G. Holder
Pte. G Batholomew	Pte. E. James
Pte. G. Bruno	Pte. N. Laidlow
Pte. A. Calliste	Pte. E. McBurnie
Pte. B. Cox	Pte. L McGloire
Pte. J. Daniels	Pte. C. Mapson
Pte. J Mitchell	Pte. J. Mark
Pte. E. Modeste	Pte. J. Pascal
Pte. C. Philbert	Pte. L. Richard
Pte. J. A. Seales	Pte. G. W. Simmons
Pte. C Parks	Pte. G. J. H. Taitt
Pte. J. Telesford	Pte. Albert Thomas
Pte. H. G. D. Sharpe	

== Involvement in World War 2 ==
Just before the war the Grenada Volunteer force, reserve force and police force were combined into one group called the Grenada defence force, which in 1944 was amalgamated into the Southern Caribbean force. The Grenada contingent of the Southern Caribbean Force had 139 troops, and served in Grenada and other Caribbean islands. There were two divisions of this force, the infantry and artillery division, both stationed in St George’s. Two artillery placements were set up at Ross’ point and Richmond hill. One of the members of the Southern Caribbean Force was Reginald D. Cherebin, who was born in Grenada and stayed in St. Lucia after the war. He died in 2025 at the age of 101 and was one of the last veterans of the Southern Caribbean force, having served in British Guiana, Trinidad and Tobago, Grenada and St. Lucia.

Julian Marryshow photographed with a Spitfire in the RaF

Many Grenadians left Grenada to fight for other nations during the Second World War, although this number was considerably less than in the First World War, one such example was the service of Julian Marryshow in the RAF, multiple other Grenadians fought in the RAF, many signing up through Trinidad. Others joined the Canadian army, such as the governor-general Sir Leo Victor de Gale.

During WW2 the Grenadian colonial government managed to amass upwards of £20,000 in donations for the War effort.

Three Grenadians died during the war, far less than in WW1, the three names are Colin P. Ross, Sgt. J.D Arthur and Sgt. John Ferris, all three served in the RAF, and are commemorated at a monument which stands in Tanteen, St George’s. There is also a cemetery in St George’s which contains the bodies of three soldiers of the Southern Caribbean force who died in Grenada: St Lucian R. Felicien, British C. Liverpool, and British S. Charles. On the island of Carriacou in the town of Hillsborough, there is a memorial to an unknown soldier of the British merchant navy who died in the Caribbean.

After the war many returning soldiers joined the Grenadian armed volunteer police force and the volunteer army, which were equipped with mainly WW2 era weaponry including SMLE Mk.III rifles, Bren guns and later imported WW2-era Mosin Nagants among other WW2-era weapons

=== Disappearance of the Island Queen ===
On the 5th August 1944, a schooner called the Island Queen and another vessel were heading from Grenada towards St Vincent and the Grenadines, however the Island Queen disappeared without a trace en route. Many theories have been proposed, such as a German submarine sunk it, or it was hit by friendly fire due to having a German engine, whilst another theory proposed by Jan Lindsay of the UWI states that the volcano “Kick ‘Em Jenny” was responsible for sinking the vessel.

Later on the 6th July 1945 an explosive mine washed ashore on the island of Carriacou, which the inhabitants thought was a barrel, the mine exploded and killed 9 individuals and injured 2 more.

== See also ==
- Johnson Beharry
