= Marryshow =

Marryshow is a surname. Notable people with the surname include:

- Julian Marryshow (1918–2012), Grenadian Royal Air Force fighter pilot
- Theophilus Albert Marryshow (1887–1958), Grenadian politician
