= Charles Sew Hoy =

New Zealand-Chinese merchant and gold-dredger

- Choie Sew Hoy, 1880s
- Born: Choie Sew Hoy c. 1836; Sha Kong, Poon Yu (now Baiyun District, Guangzhou), Guangdong Province, China
- Died: July 22, 1901 (aged 64–65); Dunedin, Otago, New Zealand

Charles Sew Hoy
- Traditional Chinese: 徐肇開
- Simplified Chinese: 徐肇开
Transcriptions
Standard Mandarin
- Hanyu Pinyin: Xú Zhàokāi
Yue: Cantonese
- Yale Romanization: Chèuih Siuh-hōi
- Jyutping: Ceoi^{4} Siu^{6} Hoi^{1}

Choie Sew Hoy, (Chinese: 徐肇開; 1836–1901) also known as Charles Sew Hoy, was a New Zealand merchant, Chinese leader, gold-dredger and a New Zealand Business Hall of Fame laureate. He was born in the village of Sha Kong in the Poon Yu District (now part of Baiyun District, Guangzhou) of Guangdong Province, China, in about 1838.

== Early life ==
Choie Sew Hoy was the eldest of four sons of Choie Bing Sum, a farmer in the village of Sha Kong (Altar Hill), in the Upper Poon Yu (Panyu) district of Canton (Guangdong) Province, China. Because of war, famine and poverty, some families in Canton Province used their access to the international ports Canton (Guangzhou) and Hong Kong to send young men overseas to work.

In the second half of the 19th Century, these men formed a living chain of migrant labourers. They sent money back, guided other family members and, sometimes, returned home relatively wealthy. Following the California gold rush, Choie Sew Hoy was one of thousands of Cantonese who went to Gum San, "the gold mountain" of California.

When the rush to Dai Gum San, the "big new gold mountain" of Australia, began, Choie Sew Hoy went to the goldfields of Victoria, but he took part in the Victorian gold rush as a merchant rather than a miner.

In 1865 the Otago Provincial Council invited Chinese miners in Victoria to come to the Otago goldfields, and Choie Sew Hoy moved his enterprise to Dunedin, New Zealand in 1869.

== Career as a merchant ==
In 1869, Choie Sew Hoy set up his business in Dunedin providing Chinese miners in Central Otago with supplies and equipment and also acting as a wholesale supplier to Chinese shopkeepers on the goldfields. His combined store and warehouse was in Stafford Street, not far from Dunedin's Rattray Street wharf and close to the coach depot for Central Otago.

Choie Sew Hoy named his company Sew Hoy and signed documents as Sew Hoy, so most non-Chinese knew him as Mr Sew Hoy. Meanwhile, his fellow Chinese in Otago knew that his family name was Choie. The black and gold sign which hung outside his store said 'Sew Hoy' in Roman letters but 'Choie Sew Hoy' in Chinese characters.

Choie Sew Hoy became a naturalised New Zealand citizen in 1873. He had a good command of English, speaking at meetings and sometimes interpreting at court hearings. He was quoted by the New Zealand press on topical issues, such as immigration and the poll tax.

The Sew Hoy company imported and sold the specialised Chinese food and goods required by the Chinese, many of whom, like Choie Sew Hoy, were from the Poon Yu district. Choie Sew Hoy also imported items to sell to Dunedin's European settlers. His store's newspaper advertisements offered tea sets and tea pots, as well as a range of teas. Also on sale were crystallised fruit, Chinese silks, cane chairs, blinds, bird cages and 'real Chinese gongs.'

In 1873 Choie Sew Hoy and several other Chinese merchants of Dunedin were the first Chinese to charter a ship to sail direct from Otago to Hong Kong. The barque Harriet Armitage carried cargo and 116 Chinese passengers from Otago to Hong Kong in March 1873. Sew Hoy's contribution to her cargo included scrap metal and 78 bales of fungus. Forty-five of the Chinese passengers, it was reported, "took with them 2,740 oz [ounces] gold, of the value of £10,000, which, we believe, represents the result of little more than three years' hard work".

The Harriet Armitage made her return voyage to Dunedin in October 1873 with what New Zealand newspapers described as "a cargo of China notions" which was "consigned to the principal Chinese firms" in Otago. Among the four Chinese passengers the Harriet Armitage carried to Dunedin was Choie Kum Yok, Choie Sew Hoy's oldest son, aged 18.

In 1876 Choie Sew Hoy and another Otago Chinese merchant, Kwong Sing Wing, chartered the North German barque Anna Dorothea to make a return voyage from Otago to Hong Kong. Freshly fitted out to carry passengers the Anna Dorothea sailed from Port Chalmers with 104 Chinese passengers, who took with them 1646 ounces of gold.

The majority of Chinese miners in Otago were from the Poon Yu district and Choie Sew Hoy was often their spokesman. In 1876 he protested to the Minister of Customs about the high duties on such Chinese foodstuff as green ginger, where the duty amounted to 200%. He also persuaded the Otago Chamber of Commerce to call for an end to the import levy on rice. Choie Sew Hoy's imports, mainly from Hong Kong, were considerable. Dr James Ng, Choie Sew Hoy's biographer, believes that Choie Sew Hoy was the Dunedin Chinese merchant who wrote in 1871 that in a period of some six months, his firm had paid about £2,000 on duties to H.M. Customs.

In 1874 Choie Sew Hoy was one of six Chinese merchants of Dunedin who arrived in an open carriage at Dunedin's exclusive Fernhill Club to present an address of welcome to the Governor, Sir James Fergusson, 6th Baronet on his first visit to Dunedin.

In export matters, Choie Sew Hoy was a very enterprising merchant, sending oats to Australia, frozen mutton to Great Britain and scrap metal to China. Just like his friend and fellow merchant, Chew Chong of New Plymouth, Choie Sew Hoy purchased dried fungus (Auriculeria polytricha or "wood ear," known to the Chinese as muk u or muk yee). He paid 3½d per pound for dried fungus and advertised widely in the Otago, Nelson and Wanganui regions. Choie Sew Hoy exported the fungus to Hong Kong, as well as to Chinese in Australia and California. An Otago reporter commented on Choie Sew Hoy's fungus: "This peculiar, dry-looking article the Chinese manufacture by some mysterious process into an article of food, no doubt palatable enough to them, but which would, I anticipate, be quickly rejected by fastidious European stomachs." Many farmers, however, found that gathering and selling the fungus, which grows on dead trees in the New Zealand bush, enabled them to weather a financially difficult period. Fungus remained an important New Zealand export to China until World War 2.

The profits from his role as a merchant enabled Choie Sew Hoy to travel back to his home village of Sha Kong, where he arranged the construction of a memorial marker for his father's grave and a sturdy brick family home, both of which are still standing. Then he did something no other New Zealand Chinese merchant had done – he made major investments in New Zealand gold-mining.

== Gold mining ==
By the late 1870s the easily accessible gold deposits in Otago and Southland had been worked out and individuals could no longer win gold with the simple placer mining methods of using gold pans, cradles and sluice boxes. Large-scale methods such as hydraulic sluicing and quartz processing required large sums of capital for the construction of water races and purchase of crushing machinery. Many companies were floated to work promising claims and Choie Sew frequently invested in such mining ventures. He was for example on the board of directors of several companies which carried out quartz reef mining at Macetown in the 1880s. These included the Premier Gold-Mining Company, the Queen Victoria Gold-Mining Company and the Tipperary Mining Company. Dr James Ng's research shows that Choie Sew Hoy was involved as a shareholder or director in at least a dozen gold mining and water-race ventures, from Waitahuna to Skippers.

Choie Sew Hoy also made mining claims in his own right, sometimes making dual applications for mining consents with his son Choie Kum Yok. They combined in 1889, for example, to apply for two adjoining claims on the Cardrona River and in a failed attempt to obtain a pair of claims at Netherby near Naseby in 1886.

== Choie Sew Hoy and the Otago gold-dredging boom ==
In 1888 Choie Sew Hoy changed the face of gold mining in New Zealand. In his own account of his innovative Big Beach venture, Choie Sew Hoy told how both European and Chinese miners, who had worked the lower Shotover River near Arthurs Point, were aware that the large river flat known as Big Beach was still rich in fine alluvial gold, despite being worked over several times and abandoned.

The problem was that the gold was below the water level in deep shingle, inaccessible to conventional mining methods. Choie Sew Hoy obtained mining rights for 140 acres at Big Beach and nearby Arthurs Point for 'C. Sew Hoy and Company'. He originally proposed "to put a tunnel in through the rocky point at the Gorge" and divert the Shotover River at an estimated cost of £4000 to £5000. The river flat would then be worked by "paddocking and sluicing". Choie Sew Hoy estimated he would be investing £20,000 in working the claim.

"The claim will be worked by a combination of European and Chinese labour, a new departure in mining," noted an Otago newspaper.

Choie Sew Hoy's Dunedin engineer, L.O. Beal, did a survey of the site with him in September 1887 and they concluded that a tunnel beneath Racecourse Terrace at Arthurs Point would not be practicable.

Choie Sew Hoy's mind then turned to using a gold dredge. Several attempts at dredging for gold had been made both in California and New Zealand but with limited success.

James Gore, a former Mayor of Dunedin later described how Choie Sew Hoy "called together a few gentlemen" and proposed to them a scheme for working by dredges the well-known Shotover Big Beach. Despite the doubts about dredging that some expressed, a privately owned company, the Shotover Big Beach Gold Mining Company, was formed, "the shareholders putting their money into what I considered an experiment".

Choie Sew Hoy apparently drew inspiration from watching the two dredges operated by the Otago Harbour Board, the bucket dredge Vulcan, which began dredging in 1877, and the bucket dredge 222, which was built in Scotland and began work in 1882. 222 had a hopper system so the spoil from its buckets could be collected.

The Shotover Big Beach Gold Mining Company commissioned the engineering firm Kincaid and McQueen of Dunedin to build them a steam-powered centre-bucket-chain gold dredge. This dredge was then transported in sections to Central Otago and assembled on the Big Beach river flat.

"As is often the case with new mechanical appliances, many additions and alterations had to be made both to the dredge and gold-saving appliances," complained James Gore, "These took up considerable time and cost a large sum of money." Trials were carried out and on 23 January 1889, Mr Beal sent Choie Sew Hoy a telegram that was to trigger the first Otago gold dredging boom. 'Dredge working Saturday evening. Engines, boiler, &c. very satisfactory. Result in tail box beyond most sanguine expectations— a few ounces. Future prospects magnificent.' After that, each week's yield was telegraphed to Dunedin and widely reported throughout the colony in the Mining pages of newspapers. "Mining is very dull, yet we had a sensation the other week when Mr Sew Hoy's dredge fished up £40 worth of gold in one day,"reported the Southland Times.

"There is great excitement in Arrowtown over the prospect of successfully dredging the Kawarau and Shotover Rivers, owing to the continued payable results of Sew Hoy's dredge at Big Beach, Shotover," noted a Naseby newspaper. The dredge, immediately labelled the Sew Hoy dredge, was the first in the world capable of working flats and riverbanks. Its success in the dredging of the Big Beach river flats initiated a major gold-seeking breakthrough. By the end of the century there were over 200 gold dredges working or being built in Otago and Southland, all based on the prototype Sew Hoy dredge of 1888.

== Sew Hoy Big Beach Gold Mining Company ==
The Sew Hoy dredge had proved its value on Big Beach but its ladder of buckets could only reach 14 feet below the water level. More dredges able to reach greater depths were needed. This would need more capital than the Shotover Big Beach Gold Mining Company could raise privately. Choie Sew Hoy had extended his mining claim, so that he now had another 40 acres, stretching about one and a half miles from the company's existing Big Beach claim down the Shotover River to Tucker Beach. In a meeting held in Dunedin in September 1889, the shareholders of the Shotover Big Beach Gold Mining Company agreed to sell all the company's assets, including the various Shotover mining claims held by Choie Sew Hoy and John Blair, to a new publicly floated mining company. It was unanimously agreed "that Mr Sew Hoy's name should in some way be associated with the title of the company". Thus the new company was launched as the Sew Hoy Big Beach Gold Mining Company Ltd. Choie Sew Hoy joined John Blair (a wealthy Dunedin seed merchant) and Peter Duncan (a successful Otago agricultural implement manufacturer) as fellow directors, while James Gore, a former Dunedin Mayor and Member of the House of Representatives (MHR), became chairman.

In a strong publicity campaign, the new company proposed to put larger and better dredges "designed to lift double the amount of stuff" on to its "wonderfully valuable" claim which now covered 260 acres, along five miles of the Shotover River. 80,000 shares were offered at £2 each. With samples of Big Beach gold exhibited in Otago and Dunedin, shares sold well. There was, however, criticism of the heavy "loading" of the company, as 48,000 of these shares went to the promoters, the owners of the mining claims.

The proprietors responded by reducing the nominal capital to £120,000 in 60,000 shares of £2 each, and the Sew Hoy Big Beach Gold Mining Company was successfully floated. "56,000 shares were allotted when the list finally closed."

In defence of the proposal, Choie Sew Hoy wrote, "The gold won by the present company is the result almost altogether from ground supposed to be worked out, both by Europeans and Chinese. I only wish to add that these results will be far surpassed, and the value of the company, as at present printed, far greater in twelve months than to-day, when we hope to gather the gold with five dredges instead of one."

In fact, the Sew Hoy Big Beach Gold Mining Coy soon cut its dredge plans to three new dredges. Tenders were called in Oct 1889 and John Anderson's foundry in Lyttelton was successful, agreeing to build the three for £14,000.

Andersons were well advanced with the first dredge by January 1890. and two others followed. By August 1890 the first dredge had been assembled on the site of the former Morning Star claim and was having its engine fitted, when floods disrupted progress. So the first new dredge (no.2) was not getting gold until 22 Dec 1890. Despite delays in construction and flood damage caused by the 'raging river,’, all four dredges were at work by May 1891. The three new dredges – prosaically named Dredges 2, 3 and 4 – were of identical construction. Each was 94 feet long, 18 feet wide and 7 feet deep, with bucket ladders 70 feet in length. Each dredge had a coal-fired steam engine, rated at 26 horse power, with a boiler working at up to 80 lb per square inch. Each of the 25 steel buckets could hold between 2½ and 3 cubic feet of material. All three dredges could work down to about 26 feet. Because the alluvial gold proved to be very fine, the company also had to fit their dredges with quicksilver [mercury] tables and were constantly upgrading their gold-saving systems. Although returns were steady, costs were also high and by 1897 the directors of the Sew Hoy Big Beach Gold Mining Coy went into voluntary liquidation and sold off the dredges and other equipment. Ironically the dredges were purchased by other companies and worked on fruitfully for years. Choie Sew Hoy meanwhile was looking further south for gold.

== Nokomai gold sluicing ==
Before Big Beach was worked out, Sew Hoy and his son Kum Poy had turned their attention to the Nokomai valley (near Parawa) in Southland, where they both registered neighbouring claims in January 1894. While earlier miners, both European and Chinese, had found gold in the valleys and spurs surrounding the Nokomai Valley, they had been unable to work the valley itself, because its gravel layer was too deep and wet to work. Finding the area also unsuitable for dredging – the gravel layer was over 100 feet deep – the Sew Hoys decided to use large-scale hydraulic sluicing. Water was crucial for this, so they had water-races, pipe-ways and dams constructed, drawing water from as far north as the Nevis headwaters. In 1898, Choie Sew Hoy calculated that he had spent £15,000 and employed 40 men to bring the water to the Nokomai site.

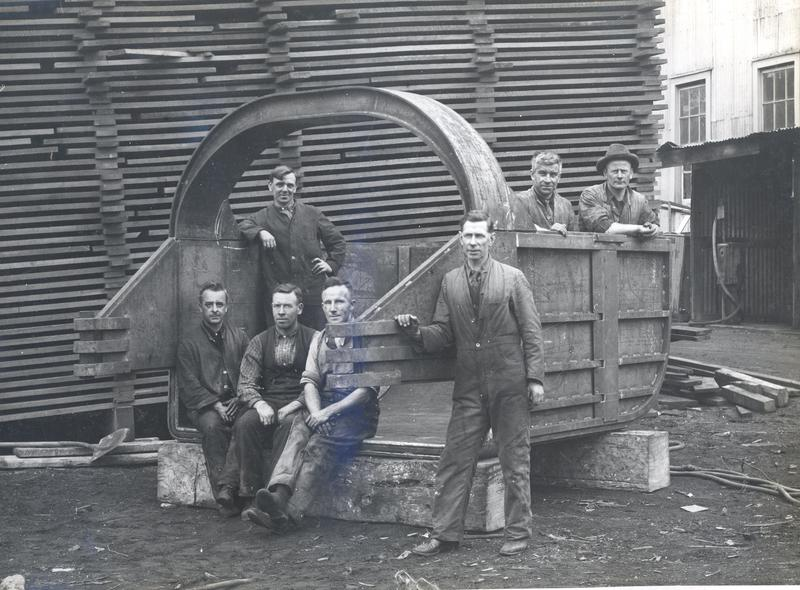
Men working on the dragline

"Mr Sew Hoy is one of the most enterprising men in this part of the colony, and it is gratifying to hear that his pluck and energy have met with success," noted a local newspaper when Choie Sew Hoy introduced electric lighting at the Nokomai site so that work could continue in three shifts around the clock. Both Europeans and Chinese (many from Sha Kong village) worked at the sluicing and on maintaining the water-races. The Nokomai Hydraulic Sluicing Company was a publicly floated company registered at the Sew Hoy office, warehouse and store at 29 Stafford Street, Dunedin. After Choie Sew Hoy's death in 1901, Kum Poy Sew Hoy headed the Sew Hoy merchant business and also put a massive effort into the development and working of the Nokomai claim. He took a leading role with the company, working as its secretary. Both Europeans and Chinese (many from Sha Kong village) worked at the sluicing and maintaining the water-races. Later Kum Poy's son Cyril Sew Hoy (1907-1971) became the manager at the Nokomai workings, thus creating a unique three-generation gold mining dynasty.

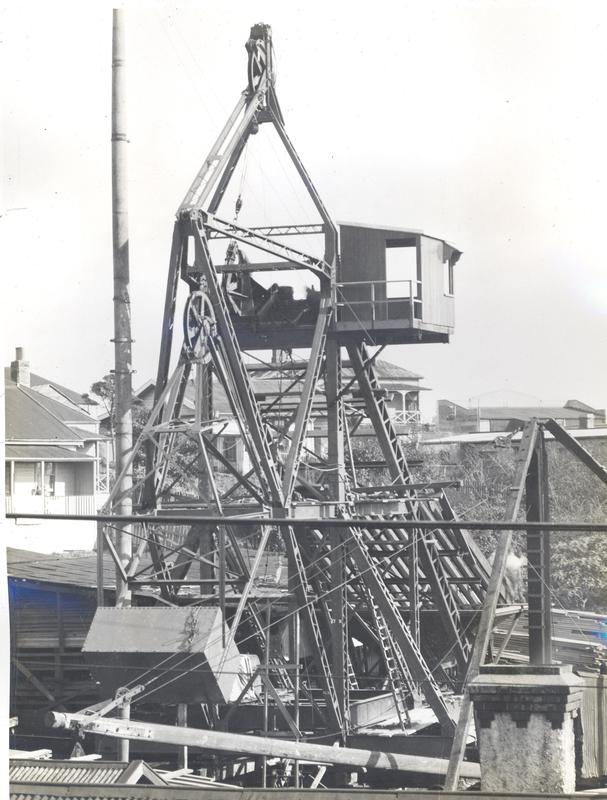
The dragline during construction

Between 1894 and 1932, the Nokomai gold miners won gold worth £223,043 from the Sew Hoy Nokomai claim but the running costs involved were becoming too high. In 1932 The Nokomai Gold Mining Coy Ltd was floated, with capital of over £60,000, to try a revolutionary method of gold production. A giant dragline excavator, weighing 150 tons, was assembled at Nokomai. The largest ever made at that time, the excavator had a 50-foot-high winch tower and a bucket that could hold 8 tons of shingle.

The dragline failed because its bucket system proved too heavy, so the company resumed hydraulic sluicing successfully assisted by the rising price of gold in the 1930s. The Nokomai operation finally had to close down during World War 2, when the New Zealand Government requisitioned the company's electricity generating plant and installed it at the Roaring Meg power station in the Cromwell Gorge.

Kum Poy died, aged 74, in Dunedin on 22 December 1942.

== Choie Sew Hoy’s family ==
Choie Sew Hoy had married Young Soy May in China in the 1850s and they had two daughters Choie Chay Ho and Choie Chay May, as well as two sons, Choie Kum Yok (1855-1932) and Choie Kum Poy (1869-1942). Both sons later came out to New Zealand to join their father in his merchant enterprise. Choie Kum Yok arrived in Otago in October 1873 on the barque Harriet Armitage, (a ship chartered by Dunedin Chinese merchants including his father). Kum Yok, then aged 18, began working in his father's firm as a merchant. Later he took out gold mining claims in Central Otago, usually in parallel with those taken out by his father. Following a brief visit to Sha Kong in 1880, Kum Yok returned permanently to China about 1897 and handled the Canton end of Sew Hoy's company business from Guangzhou (Canton city ), until his death in 1932. The younger son, Choie Kum Poy, arrived in Dunedin on the Tamsui in July 1884, aged 15. Kum Poy studied at Dunedin's Normal School before he began working with his father. Following Choie Sew Hoy's lead, he used Sew Hoy as his surname, so is usually known as Kum Poy Sew Hoy.

Meanwhile, Choie Sew Hoy had married his young English-language secretary, Eliza Ann Prescott (1868-1909) and they had two children, Violet (born in 1892) and Henry (born in 1895). The Sew Hoy family lived in "Canton Villa," a modest weatherboard house in Cumberland Street, where their general servant enjoyed "liberal wages". On 22 July 1901, Sew Hoy turned at the gate to wave to Eliza, before walking to his office, suffered an aneurysm and died. The news of his death was published in all Australian and New Zealand newspapers.

== Cheong Shing Tong and Cantonese reburials ==
Soon after their arrival in Otago, the Cantonese gold-miners from Poon Yu (Panyu) and Fah Yue (Hua) counties had founded a benevolent society, the Cheong Shing Tong, to care for elderly and needy Chinese, and also to return their bodies to Canton. Choie Sew Hoy was the first president of the Cheong Shing Tong. When the society began its first mass exhumation of deceased miners' remains in 1883, all the fundraising and administration was run from Choie Sew Hoy's office at his store in Stafford Street, Dunedin. In April 1883 230 bodies, mainly from Otago and the West Coast, were safely conveyed to China for reburial by the SS Hoihow.

Ironically by the time the Cheong Shing Tong had organised the next major exhumation, between 1899 and 1902, Choie Sew Hoy had died (in 1901). It was left to his son Kum Poy Sew Hoy (his successor as the president of the Cheong Shing Tong) to continue overseeing the gathering of human remains from 39 graveyards around New Zealand. The bones of the 'former friends' were carefully cleaned, labelled and packed into zinc-lined kauri coffins or body-boxes. A total of 501 coffins were loaded on the SS Ventnor in Wellington. (The total had been thought to be 499 but Nigel Murphy's recent research in the NZ Archives found the names of at least 501 and possibly 503.) The SS Ventnor sailed from Wellington for Hong Kong on 26 October 1902 but struck a reef off the coast of Taranaki early the next morning. The captain tried to make for Auckland but the Ventnor sank about ten miles off the Hokianga Heads on 28 October 1902. Although three lifeboats got away safely, the fourth was swamped, drowning 13 men, including Choie Sew Hoy's elderly nephew, Choie Kum Foo, who was one of the body-attendants accompanying the coffins. Searchers found only a few of the coffins washed ashore, and there the matter rested until a remarkable series of events more than a century later.

== Recent events ==
In 2009, Liu Shueng Wong, a New Zealand-born Chinese researcher and writer, was working with Nigel Murphy and Kirsten Wong on what they named The Ventnor project, preparing a filmed documentary about the sinking of the SS Ventnor and the significance of its cargo of human remains. Liu Shueng spoke with Māori people along the Hokianga coast. She was told that the local Te Rarawa, Ngāpuhi and Te Roroa iwi (tribes) had stories they had grown up with about human remains washing up on the beaches and being buried in urupa (burial-places). "I always heard that there were Chinese people buried in different urupa and in the sand dunes and places like that," says Te Rarawa's Paul White. "People got told by the old ones don't forget to look after the Chinese people that are buried over there."

In March 2009, the Māori groups involved invited representatives of the Chinese New Zealand people to meet with them at Matihetihe Marae in Mitimiti. Members of the Ventnor Project, the Poon Fah Association (people of Panyu and Hua counties descent), Otago-Southland Branch of the New Zealand Chinese Association and several descendants of Choie Sew Hoy came. They were able to acknowledge their tupuna (ancestors) whose remains had been washed up on Mitimiti beach, and "to open relations with the iwi who have cared for the remains of their ancestors since 1902".

Since then ceremonies have been held to honour the dead. During a similar 3-day visit in April 2013, plaques were also erected in Kawarua and Mitimiti to record the gratitude of the Chinese to the Māori who had cared for the remains of their fellow countrymen. The inscription on each, in English, Chinese and Māori, reads: With gratitude of the New Zealand descendants of the Poon Fah and Jeng Seng districts to the iwi of this area for respecting and caring for the remains of the Chinese washed ashore following the sinking of the SS Ventnor on 28 October 1902. May their souls now rest in peace in your rohe. In 2014 Māori Television screened a documentary film, 'The Lost Voyage of 499', narrated by George Henare, which shows Duncan Sew Hoy, a great-grandson of Choie Sew Hoy, with his son Dr Peter Sew Hoy, retracing their ancestor's life and death.

By coincidence, 2014 was also the year, a diving group, the Project Ventnor Group, led by John Albert, began to examine the 150-metre-deep wreckage of the Ventnor, using deep diving and decompression equipment. (Remote equipment had spotted the wreck in 2012.) Working in difficult conditions, the divers confirmed the shipwreck was indeed the Ventnor. There was some controversy over the divers' removal of items from the wreck.

In the interim, a legal loophole was also closed. All shipwrecks in New Zealand waters prior to 1900 are classified and protected as heritage sites. The Ventnor, which, sank in 1902, was outside the law but was now given the same legal protection. On 8 May 2014 the wreck was added to the New Zealand Archaeological Association's site recording scheme and is now covered by the archaeological provisions of the Historic Places Act 1993. It is now illegal to damage or modify the wreck or remove items from it. .

In August 2015, the Ministry for Culture and Heritage put the artifacts – the remains of a saucer, bell, port-hole fitting, ship's engine telegraph and lamp-bracket – into police care and called for public submissions on their future ownership.

The 185 submissions – 166 of which came from Sew Hoy family members – overwhelmingly urged that the Ventnor artifacts should be preserved in a museum, preferably The Museum of New Zealand: Te Papa Tongarewa. On 10 June 2016, Paul James, the Chief Executive of the Ministry for Culture and Heritage stated that the Crown will assume custody of the Ventnor objects to allow for their future care and management. Te Papa seemed the most likely destination.

Meanwhile, planning is going ahead for a Chinese Historic Ventnor Trail in Northland. Liu Sheung Wong's March 2015 proposal to the Far North District Council highlights six key spots on the proposed trail: Te Roroa (plaque and Ventnor Kauri Grove), Signal Station Road, Old Wharf Road (Omapere Beach), Hokianga Museum, Rawene Cemetery and Mitimiti Beach "where there is a beautiful red gateway, a plaque and on outlook to view".

In 2017, Choie Sew Hoy was posthumously inducted as a Laureate to the New Zealand Business Hall of Fame.

In 2019, the Sew Hoy Gold Workings and Water-Race System in the Nokomai area were declared a Category 1 Historic Place. Liu Shueng Wong is also working on a book, The Call of the Ancestors, dealing with the story of the Ventnor's sinking, due for publication in 2019.

In March 2021, the Sew Hoy Building (built in 1894) at 29 Stafford Street, Dunedin, was declared a Category 1 Historic Place.

In April 2021, the Ventnor Memorial was unveiled in the front of Manea Footprints of Kupe, Opononi.

== Sew Hoy family reunions ==
The descendants of Choie Sew Hoy have been active in celebrating family heritage and bringing the wider family together. There have been four official family reunions - in 2007 (Queenstown), in 2013 (Dunedin), in 2019 (Dunedin) and in 2025 (Guangzhou, China).

The 2019 family reunion marked the 150th Anniversary since Sew Hoy arrived in Dunedin. It consisted of 3 days of events - including a bowling night, a historical walking tour, a mini documentary screening, a gala dinner, and an outdoor family activities day. Toitu Otago Settlers Museum curator and historian Sean Brosnahan was invited to attend, speak and accept some memorabilia from this event. Just under 250 family members gathered.

In April 2025, the fourth Choie (Xu in Mandarin) or Sew Hoy family reunion was held in Guangzhou, China.

== Books and published history ==
In 2020, Jenny Sew Hoy Agnew and Trevor Gordon Agnew released their book "Merchant, Miner, Mandarin: The Life and Times of the Remarkable Choie Sew Hoy", an illustrated and deeply researched biography of Sew Hoy's story.
