= Emanuel Gittens Knight =

Grenadian senior magistrate (1893–1961)

MBE Emmanuel Gitten Knight
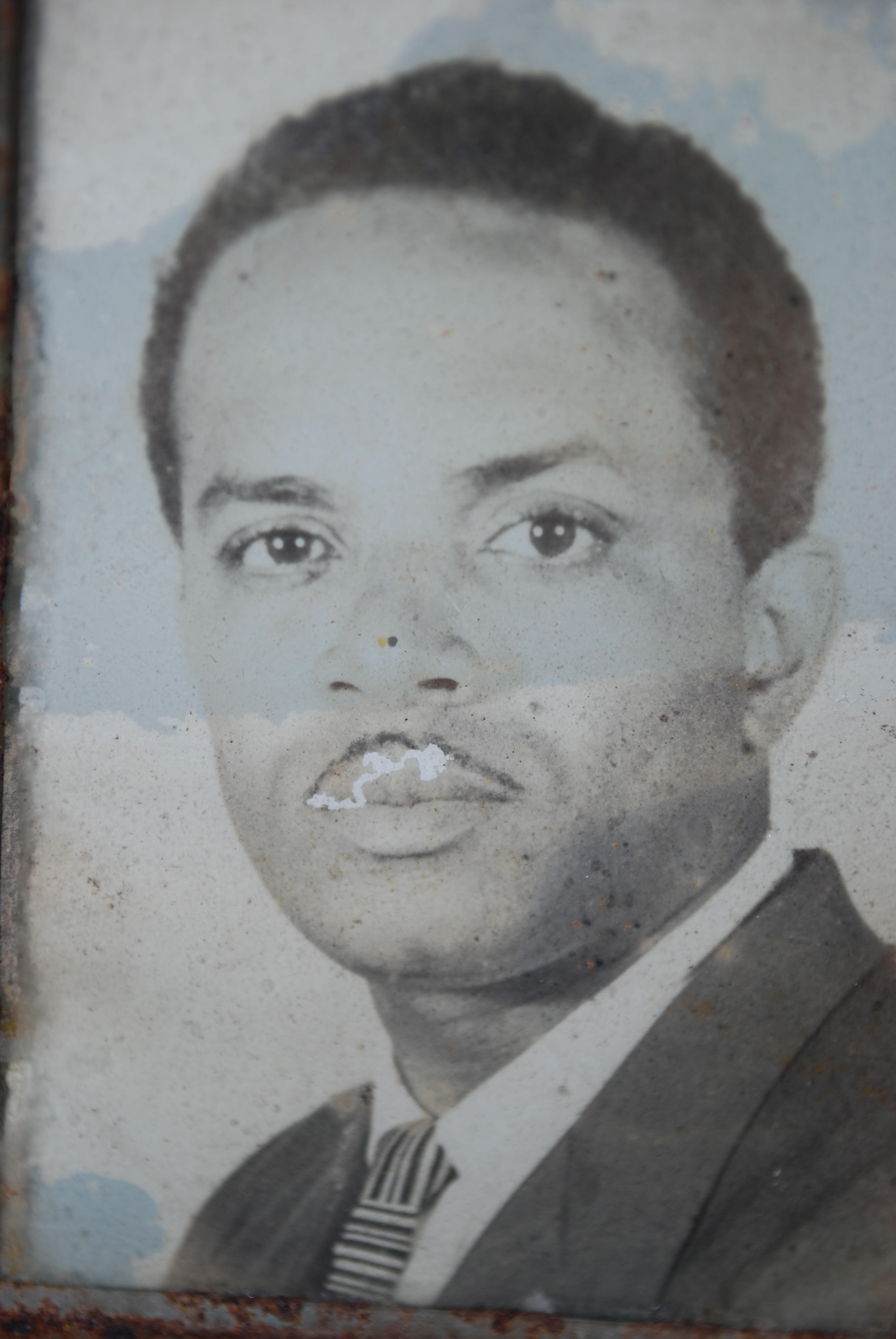

Senior Magistrate of Grenada
- In office 15 September 1937 – 20 December 1944

Attorney General of Grenada

Colonial Treasurer of Grenada

Personal details
- Born: Emmanuel Gittens Knight; 26 October 1893 St. George's, Grenada, British West Indies
- Died: 16 January 1961 (aged 67) St. George's, Grenada, British West Indies
- Children: 9
- Education: Inner Temple (LLB)

Emmanuel Gittens Knight MBE (26 October 1893 – 16 January 1961) was a Grenadian Senior Magistrate, Attorney General, Colonial Treasurer and Competent Authority of Grenada, who compiled The Grenada Handbook and Directory (1946). The handbook is a compendium of useful statistical facts about Grenada under British rule. The amount of information it contains is so immense that it has been mined for decades by scholars and researchers from many disciplines.

== Career ==
Knight joined the British West Indies Colonial service in 1911. He was called to the Bar in 1932. He held several Magistracies on several occasions, acted as Colonial Treasurer and acted as Attorney general for the Windward Islands at various times. He supervised Grenada's first adult-franchise elections in 1951, and assisted in revising the island laws of Dominica in 1935.

== Personal life ==
Knight graduated from the Inner Temple, one of the four Inns of Court in London in 1932. He was a personal friend of T.A. Marryshow, who was considered the father of the West Indies Federation. Knight often hosted writers (including Wenzell Brown) and scholars (such as M. G. Smith) when they conducted research in Grenada.

== Honours and awards ==
Knight was bestowed Member of the Order of the British Empire (MBE) in the 1945 Birthday Honours for his relentless civil service work. Just after World War II, Knight was awarded the Emslie Horniman Scholarship Fund for research in Caribbean anthropology.

== Death and heritage ==
In his 67th year, Knight died in St George's, Grenada. He never married but fathered nine children. One of his children, Thelma Phillip Knight, was also bestowed Member of the Order of the British Empire (MBE) for her lifetime contribution to the preservation and dissemination of Grenadian Folk life and culture.

Legal offices
| Preceded by | Senior Magistrate of Grenada | Succeeded by |
