= John Daley (RAF officer) =

John Albert Edward Robertson Daley
- Born: 5 February 1898; Kingston, Jamaica
- Died: 8 July 1918 (aged 20); France
- Military career
- Allegiance: United Kingdom
- Branch: British Army; Royal Air Force
- Service years: 1916–1918
- Rank: Lieutenant
- Units: British West Indies Regiment; No. 13 Squadron RFC; No. 24 Squadron RAF
- Awards: Distinguished Flying Cross

Lieutenant John Albert Edward Robertson Daley DFC (5 February 1898 – 8 July 1918) was a British World War I flying ace credited with six aerial victories.

Daley was born in Kingston, Jamaica, the son of George E. Daley of New Market, St. Elizabeth, Jamaica, and attended the Potsdam School. He enlisted on 19 January 1916 as a private in the 2nd Jamaica Battalion, British West Indies Regiment, and on 6 March 1916 he was confirmed as a temporary second lieutenant.

The same day he was one of 25 officers and 1,115 other ranks of the Third Jamaica Contingent who embarked on SS Verdala at Kingston. Due to enemy submarine activity Verdala was routed to England via Halifax, Nova Scotia. En route she ran into a blizzard. Verdala was not properly heated and the soldiers had not been issued with enough warm clothing, causing 600 cases of exposure and frostbite, and five deaths. On arrival at Halifax 106 men were hospitalized.

On 6 April 1917 Daley was appointed a flying officer (observer) in the Royal Flying Corps, with seniority from 27 December 1916, serving in No. 13 Squadron. On 27 December 1917 he was appointed a flying officer, serving in No. 24 Squadron, flying a S.E.5a. Between March and July 1918 he shot down five aircraft and a kite balloon, but was killed in action only a week after his final victory.

== Awards ==
His award of the Distinguished Flying Cross was gazetted a month after his death.

T./Lt. John Albert Edward Robertson Daley (formerly British West Indies Regiment.)
This officer has destroyed five enemy aeroplanes and two kite balloons, displaying marked skill and daring in these several actions, and also in attacking troops close to the ground.
