= Gershom Browne =

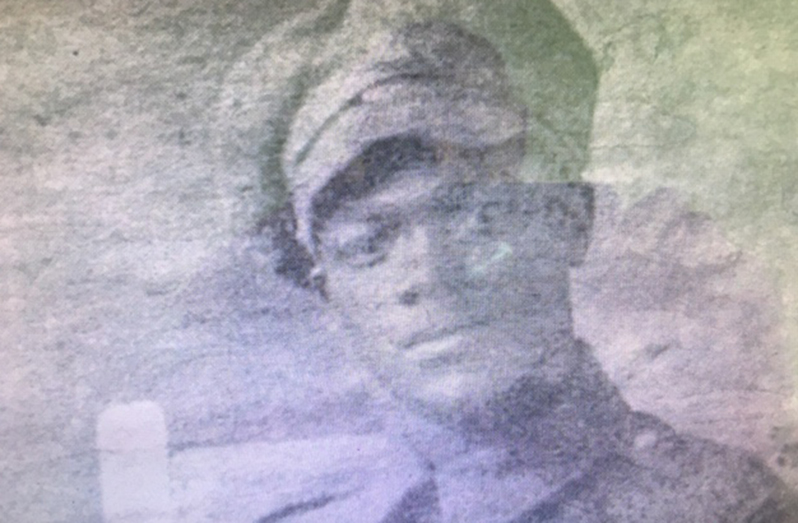
Gershom Browne in 1914

Gershom Onesimus Browne (8 August 1898 – 6 December 2000) was the last known Guyanese First World War veteran. He served in the 1st British West Indies Regiment and fought in the North African and Middle East theatres during the war.

== Military career ==
Browne is descended from the Loko people of Sierra Leone and was born in Guyana in 1898. He left his home in Bagotville to enlist in Georgetown without his mother's permission. He lied about his age to join up at the age of seventeen. He later recalled "All of us felt glad that we were going — we were glad to go, man". Browne saw service in the North African theatre and in the Palestine campaign. Browne rose to become a sergeant and in 1918 captured a bridge held by 30 Turkish troops under a German officer. He was successful in preventing his men from shooting the prisoners outright.

At the end of the war Browne passed through the transit camp at Taranto, Italy, just after the 9th battalion of his regiment mutinied there over pay and conditions. He went on to serve in the garrison in Egypt.

== Later life ==
Browne chose to be discharged and returned to Guyana. He found work as a diamond prospector in the hinterland but soon returned to Bagotville to become a farmer. From 1940 until 1978 he was a village administrator. Even in retirement he was called upon to adjudicate in local disputes and wrote a book entitled The History of Bagotville. He was featured in the 1999 documentary Mutiny, where he spoke about his experiences. Browne died on 6 December 2000 at the age of 102. He was the last surviving Guyanese veteran of the First World War and is commemorated by a plaque on his former house.

== See also ==
- List of last surviving World War I veterans by country
