= Rankin & Blackmore =

Scottish marine engine manufacturer

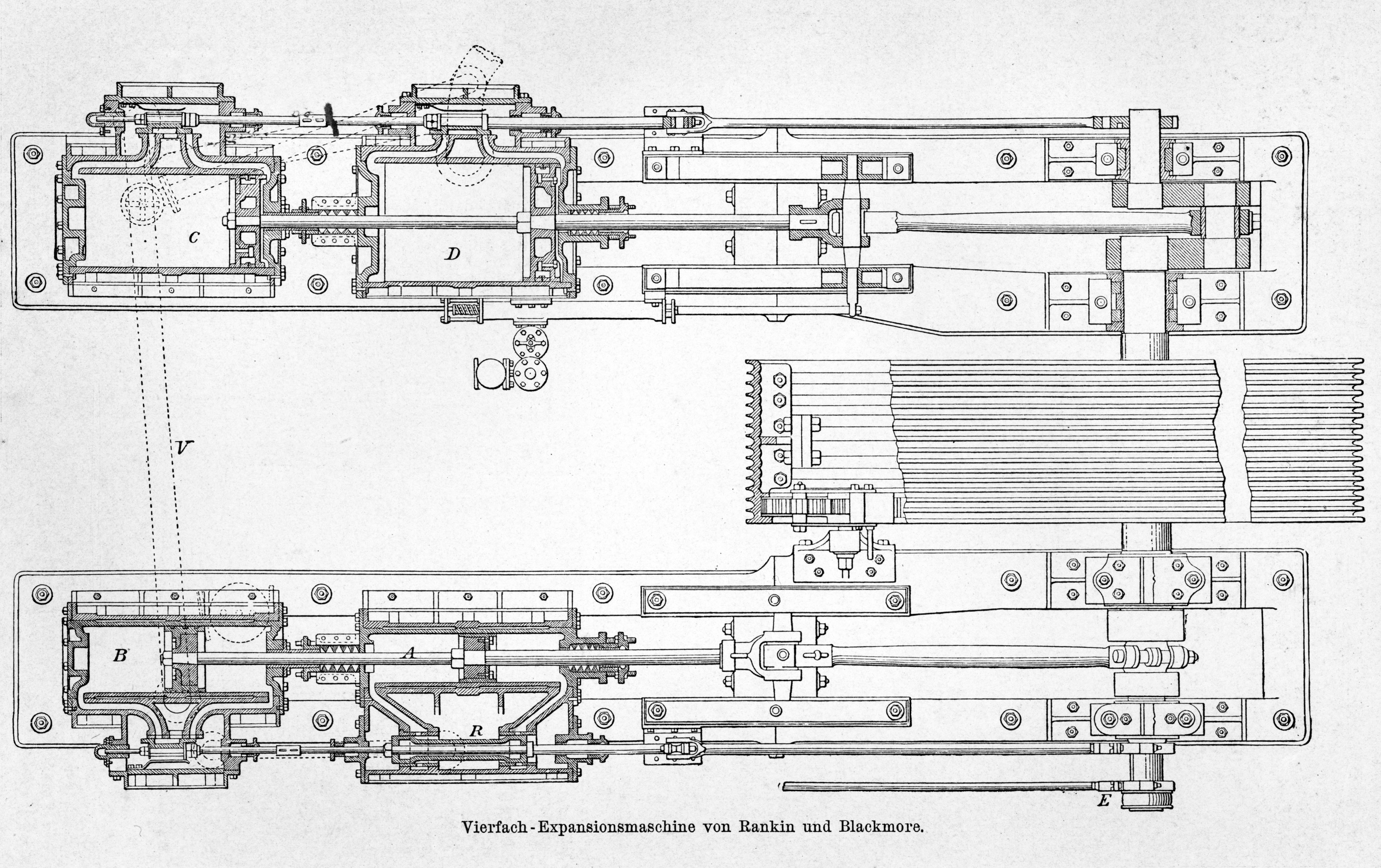
1894 Rankin & Blackmore: a quadruple-expansion rope drive engine

Rankin & Blackmore Ltd was a Scottish firm of marine engine makers. The firms origins lie in the purchase of the Johnstone and Leitch's Eagle Foundry in Greenock in 1862 by Daniel Rankin and Edward Blackmore. The firm was incorporated in 1914 and was bought by Lithgows in 1923. The firm closed in the 1960s going into voluntary liquidation in 1967.

Rankin & Blackmore supplied engines to a number of ships including SS Ventnor (1901). USS Martha Washington (ID-3019) (1907), SS Verdala (1913), SS Monrovia (1943), PS Bristol Queen (1946), PS Waverley (1947), and PS Maid of the Loch (1953)
