= SS Monrovia =

French cargo ship

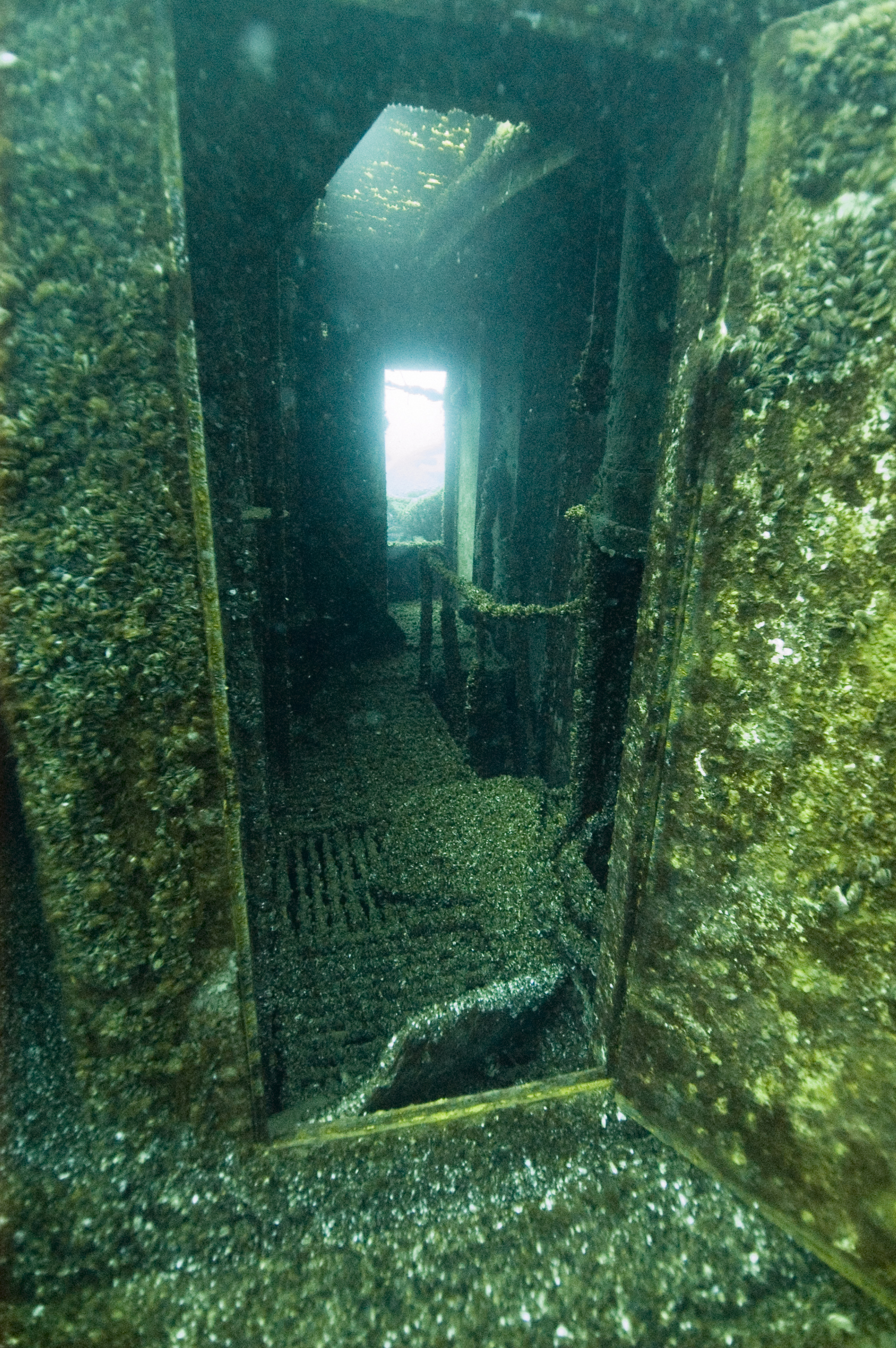
- Passageway in shipwreck

History
- Name: Empire Falstaff (1943–45); Commandant Mantelet (1945–50); Commandant le Bilboul (1950-54); Monrovia (1954-59)
- Owner: Ministry of War Transport (1943–45); French Government (1945–50); Société Navale Delmas-Vieljeux (1950–54); Eastern Shipping Corporation (1954–59)
- Operator: Gibbs & Co Ltd (1943–45); Compagnie de Transports Oceaniques (1945–50); Société Navale Delmas-Vieljeux (1950–54); Eastern Shipping Corporation (1954–59)
- Port of registry: Greenock, United Kingdom (1943–45); Cherbourg, France (1945–50); (France) La Rochelle (1950–54); Monrovia, Liberia (1954–59)
- Builder: Lithgows Ltd
- Yard number: 981
- Launched: 8 April 1943
- Completed: May 1943
- Maiden voyage: 25 June 1943
- Out of service: 26 May 1959
- Identification: United Kingdom Official Number 169502 (1943–45); Code Letters BFGV (1943–45); Code Letters ELOF (1954–56)
- Fate: Rammed and sunk

General characteristics
- Type: Cargo ship
- Tonnage: 7,067 GRT; 4,808 NRT; 9,950 DWT
- Length: 432 ft 7 in (131.85 m)
- Beam: 56 ft 2 in (17.12 m)
- Draught: 26 ft 3 in (8.00 m)
- Depth: 34 ft 2 in (10.41 m)
- Propulsion: Triple expansion steam engine, single screw propeller

Location where Monrovia sank in Lake Huron off the coast of Michigan.

Monrovia was a 7,067 GRT cargo ship that was built in 1943 by Lithgows Ltd, Glasgow, United Kingdom as Empire Falstaff for the Ministry of War Transport (MoWT). In 1945, she was transferred to the French Government and renamed Commandant Mantelet. She was sold into merchant service in 1950 and renamed Commandant le Bilboul. In 1954, she was sold to a Liberian company and renamed Monrovia, serving until 1959 when she was in collision with another ship in Lake Huron, United States and sank.

== Description ==
The ship was built in 1943 by Lithgows Ltd, Glasgow. She was yard number 981.

The ship was 432 feet 7 inches (131.85 m) long, with a beam of 56 feet 2 inches (17.12 m). She had a depth of 34 feet 2 inches (10.41 m) and a draught of 26 feet 3 inches (8.00 m). She was assessed at 7,067 GRT, 4,808 NRT. 9,950 DWT.

The ship was propelled by a triple expansion steam engine, which had cylinders of 25 1/2 inches (65 cm), 37 1/2 inches (95 cm) and 68 inches (170 cm) diameter by 48 inches (120 cm) stroke. The engine was built by Rankin & Blackmore, Glasgow and drove a single screw propeller.

== History ==
Empire Falstaff was launched on 8 April 1943 and completed in May 1943. The Code Letters BFGV and United Kingdom Official Number 169502 were allocated. Her port of registry was Greenock. She was operated under the management of Gibbs & Co Ltd.

Empire Falstaff made her maiden voyage as part of Convoy KMS19G, which departed from the Clyde on 25 June and passed Gibraltar on 6 July, becoming Convoy KMS19, which arrived at Malta on 22 July as part of Operation Husky. Empire Falstaff then joined Convoy KMS19T, which departed from Malta on 23 July and arrived at Tripoli, Libya the next day. She departed from Tripoli on 26 July as a member of Convoy MKS19Y, which arrived at Gibraltar on 31 July. Empire Falstaff left the convoy at Bizerta, Algeria the next day.

Empire Falstaff departed from Bizerta on 4 September to join Convoy GUS14, which had departed from Alexandria, Egypt on 30 August and arrived at the Hampton Roads, Virginia, United States on 26 September. She left the convoy at Bougie, Algeria on 6 September. Empire Falstaff departed from Bougie on 21 September to join Convoy KMS26, which had departed from Gibraltar on 18 September and arrived at Port Said, Egypt on 29 September. She left the convoy at Malta on 24 September. She then sailed to Naples, Italy, from where she departed on 14 October for Malta, arriving two days later. Empire Falstaff sailed from Malta on 24 October and arrived at Tripoli the next day.

Empire Falstaff departed from Tripoli on 28 October with Convoy TX6 to Alexandria. She departed from Alexandria on 13 November to join Convoy MKS31, which had departed from Port Said that day and arrived at Gibraltar on 23 November. She left the convoy at Augusta, Sicily, Italy, from where she sailed on 19 November with Convoy AH9A, which arrived at Bari, Italy two days later. She left the convoy at Taranto. Empire Falstaff departed from Taranto on 28 November to join Convoy HA10, which had departed from Brindisi that day and arrived at Augusta on 30 November. She departed from Augusta on 2 December to join Convoy GUS23, which had departed from Port Said on 27 November and arrived at the Hampton Roads on 25 December. She left the convoy at Bizerta on 4 December, sailing four days later to join Convoy MKS33, which had departed from Alexandria on 2 December and arrived at Gibraltar on 13 December. She left the convoy at Philippeville, Algeria the next day. Empire Falstaff departed from Philippeville on 23 December and sailed to Augusta, arriving on 26 December. She departed the next day with Convoy AH15, which arrived at Bari on 30 December. She left the convoy at Taranto on 29 December.

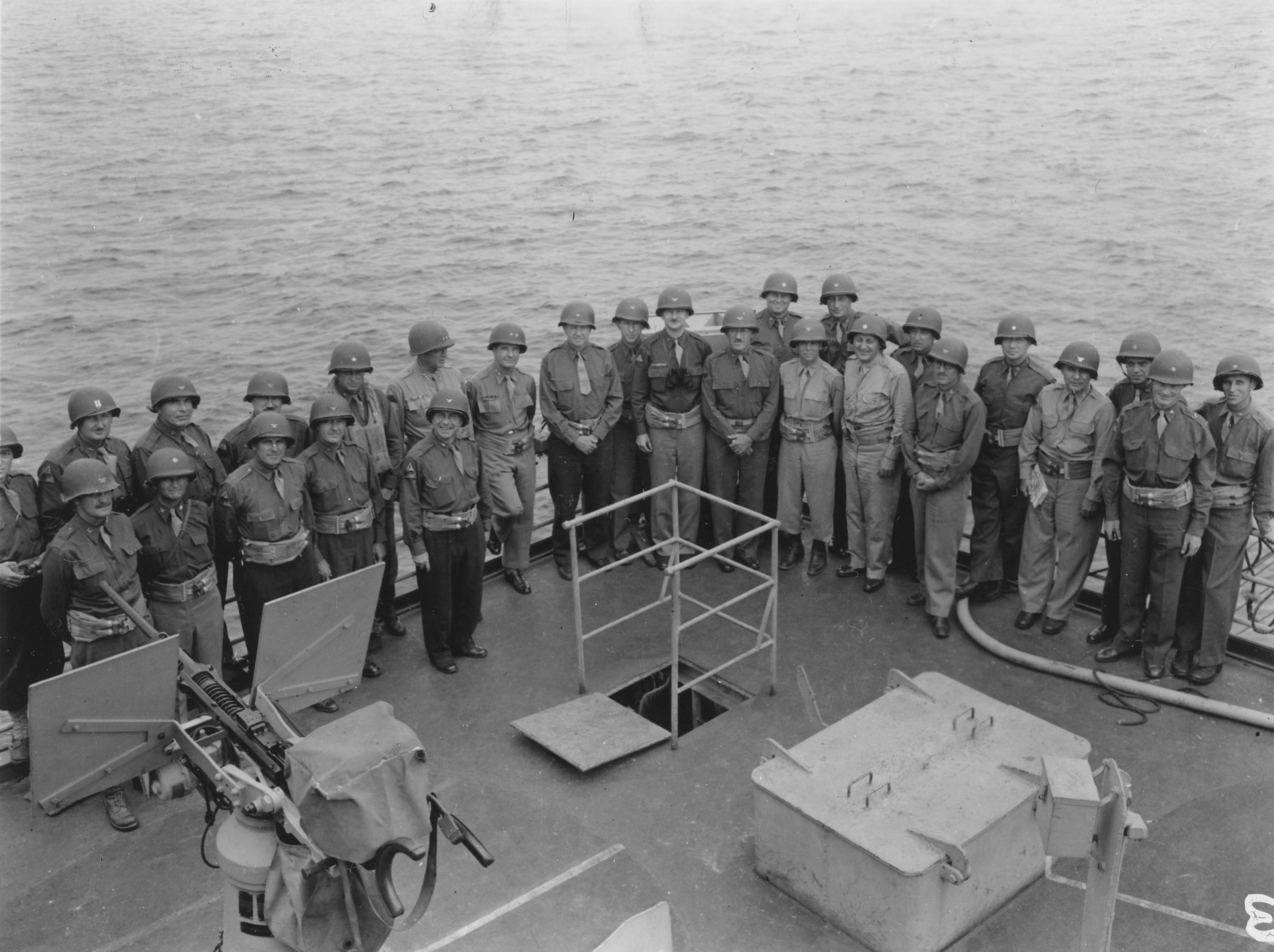
View of Lieutenant General George S. Patton's Seventh Army staff aboard SS Monrovia, en route to Sicily, June/July 1943.

Empire Falstaff departed from Taranto on 5 January 1944 to join Convoy HA16, which had departed from Bari that day and arrived at Augusta two days later. She sailed three days later to join Convoy GUS27, which had departed from Port Said on 5 January and arrived at the Hampton Roads on 4 February. She left the convoy at Gibraltar on 16 January. Empire Falstaff departed from Gibraltar on 26 January for Rio de Janeiro, Brazil, where she arrived on 17 February. She sailed on 1 March for Freetown, Sierra Leone, arriving on 14 March. Empire Falstaff departed from Freetown on 22 March as a member of Convoy SL153, which rendezvoused at sea with Convoy MKS44 on 2 April. She was carrying a cargo of iron ore and eight passengers. The combined convoy arrived at Liverpool, Lancashire on 13 April. Empire Falstaff continued on to Loch Ewe and joined Convoy WN570, which arrived at Methil, Fife on 15 April. She then joined Convoy FS1424, which departed from Methil on 16 April and arrived at Southend, Essex on 18 April. She left the convoy at Middlesbrough, Yorkshire on 17 April.

Empire Falstaff then sailed to Southend. She spent July and the first week in August 1944 sailing between Southend and the Seine Bay in various convoys, arriving back at Southend on 6 August. Empire Falstaff departed from Southend on 24 August as a member of Convoy FN1459, which arrived at Methil on 26 August. She left the convoy at the River Tyne on 26 August, departing the next day to join Convoy FN1461, which had departed from Southend that day and arrived at Methil on 28 August. She then joined Convoy EN428 which departed the next day and arrived at Loch Ewe on 31 August. Empire Falstaff then sailed to Sydney, Nova Scotia, Canada, where she joined Convoy SQ93, which departed on 15 September and arrived at Father Point, Quebec three days later. She then sailed to Red Islet, from where she joined Convoy QS94, which sailed on 29 September and arrived at Sydney on 3 October. Empire Falstaff arrived at Halifax, Nova Scotia on 5 October. Laden with a cargo of lumber, she departed with Convoy SC159 on 18 October, arriving at Liverpool on 2 November.

Empire Falstaff departed from Liverpool on 28 November with Convoy ONS37, which arrived at Halifax on 21 December. Her destination was New York, United States. She then joined Convoy XB138, which arrived at Boston, Massachusetts, United States on 23 December. She left the convoy at the Cape Cod Canal on 22 December and arrived at New York two days later.

Empire Falstaff departed from New York on 17 January 1945 as a member of Convoy NG484, which arrived at Guantanamo Bay, Cuba on 23 January. She then joined Convoy GAT 186, which arrived at Trinidad on 29 January. Empire Falstaff was the only member of Convoy TJ63, which departed from Trinidad on 30 January and arrived at Rio de Janeiro on 16 February. The convoy was listed as being bound for Cape Town, South Africa, which is where she arrived on 28 February. She sailed from Cape Town on 3 March, arriving at Durban, South Africa five days later. Empire Falstaff departed from Durban on 4 April for Aden, arriving on 21 April and departing the next day. She arrived at Suez, Egypt on 29 April and the sailed to Port Said, arriving the next day and Alexandria the day after that. Empire Falstaff departed from Alexandria on 14 May for Gibraltar, arriving on 23 May. Laden with a cargo of cotton and onions, she departed on 25 May as a member of Convoy MKS103G, which arrived at Liverpool on 1 June. She left the convoy in British waters and arrived at Swansea, Glamorgan on 31 May. She departed from Swansea on 13 June and arrived at Newport, Monmouthshire the next day.

Empire Falstaff departed from Newport on 28 June for Cherbourg, Seine-Maritime, arriving two days later. She was sold to the French Government and renamed Commandant Mantelet. She was operated under the management of Compagnie de Transports Oceaniques, Cherbourg. On 5 February 1950, Commandant Mantelet suffered machinery damage off the Île de Sein, Finistère (47°15′N 4°54′W) and requested assistance. The tug Abeille 25 was sent to her aid. Before the tug arrived, temporary repairs had been made and she was able to steam slowly to Le Verdon-sur-Mer, Marne, escorted by Abeille 25. In 1954, she was sold to Société Navale Delmas Vieljeux, La Rochelle and renamed Commandant le Bilboul.

In 1954, Commandant le Bilboul was sold to the Eastern Shipping Corporation, Monrovia, Liberia and renamed Monrovia. The Code Letters ELOF were allocated. On 26 May 1959, she was rammed by Royalston in Lake Huron 11 nautical miles (20 km) north of Thunder Bay Island, Michigan, United States (44°35′25″N 82°33′12″W) during foggy weather and sank. She was on a voyage from Antwerp, Belgium to Chicago, Illinois, United States. Her crew survived. The wreck lies upright in 140 feet (43 m) deep water.
