= Stanley Stair =

British West Indies Regiment veteran (1900–2008)

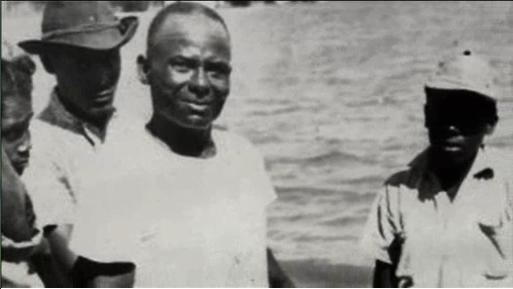
- Born: 20 October 1900
- Died: April 2008 (aged 107); Animal Hill, Lucea, Jamaica
- Military career
- Allegiance: United Kingdom
- Branch: British West Indies Regiment
- Service years: 1916–1918
- Rank: Private
- Unit: 3rd Battalion
- Conflicts: World War I
- Awards: British War Medal; Victory Medal

Charles Stanley Stair (20 October 1900 – April 2008) was a soldier in the British West Indies Regiment, who was at the time of his death the last surviving veteran from the Caribbean to have served in the First World War. He enlisted into the labour corps in 1916, and was sent from Jamaica to France and Italy as one of more than 15,000 men who volunteered for "The Coloured Regiment". At the end of the war, he was awarded the British War Medal and the Victory Medal. He lived to be 107 years old.

== Early life and family ==
Stanley Stair was born in Bellview, Saint Ann Parish, Jamaica, to Adolphus and Sarah Stair (née Campbell). In 1907, they moved to Haughton Court Estate, the plantation where both his parents worked.

== Military career ==
At the age of 15, Stair joined the British West Indian Regiment. Because he was too young to enlist, Stair was turned away at the recruitment office. According to his grandchildren, Stair was so determined to join the British war effort, he went to a different recruitment office in the same town, and lied about his age.

In March 1916, Stair was one of 1,140 volunteers who left Jamaica on the ship Verdala, which was diverted to Halifax, Nova Scotia, on the way to France to avoid a German gunboat. There, a severe Arctic blizzard caused 600 men, wearing only their summer uniforms, to suffer from exposure and hypothermia; five men died, and there were more than 100 amputations due to frostbite. Stair avoided injury and finally arrived with the 3rd Battalion in France in September 1916. As part of the manual labour corps, his unit dug trenches, and were shot at as they carried artillery shells up to the field guns to be loaded. According to British journalist Ian Hislop, the work the Black soldiers performed was "dangerous drudgery".

Stair himself told the Jamaica Gleaner that after a year and a half in France, his unit was sent to Italy on an 11-day journey by rail, and was involved in a collision with an Italian passenger train while passing through Brindisi, resulting in mass casualties for the other train. Of the group of friends he had enlisted with in Jamaica, Stair was the only one to survive the war.

== Life after the war ==
Following the war, Stair returned to Jamaica and worked on sugar plantations through the 1960s. For four years, he worked as a labourer in Cuba for nine months of the year. He then returned to the Haughton Court Estate in Jamaica, where he worked his way up to the role of plantation overseer. Stair was married twice, had nine children and raised a total of fifteen children.

In 2004, Stair was honoured with an award from the Hanover Homecoming Foundation for his contributions to the Hanover Parish. He died in Animal Hill – the community in Lucea, Jamaica, which he had helped to name – in April 2008 at the age of 107. He was at the time of his death the last surviving Caribbean World War I veteran who had served on the western front.

== Legacy ==
In 2007, the Hanover Chamber of Commerce started a campaign to erect a cenotaph to honour local heroes of the First and Second World Wars, including Stair. In November 2009, eighteen months after his death, Channel 4 in the United Kingdom broadcast "Soldiers of Empire", an episode in the series Not Forgotten, in which Ian Hislop interviewed two of Stair's grandchildren about his life.

== See also ==
- British West Indies Regiment
- George Blackman
- List of last surviving World War I veterans by country
