= Johnson Beharry =

British Army soldier (born 1979)

Warrant Officer Class 1 Johnson Beharry VC COG
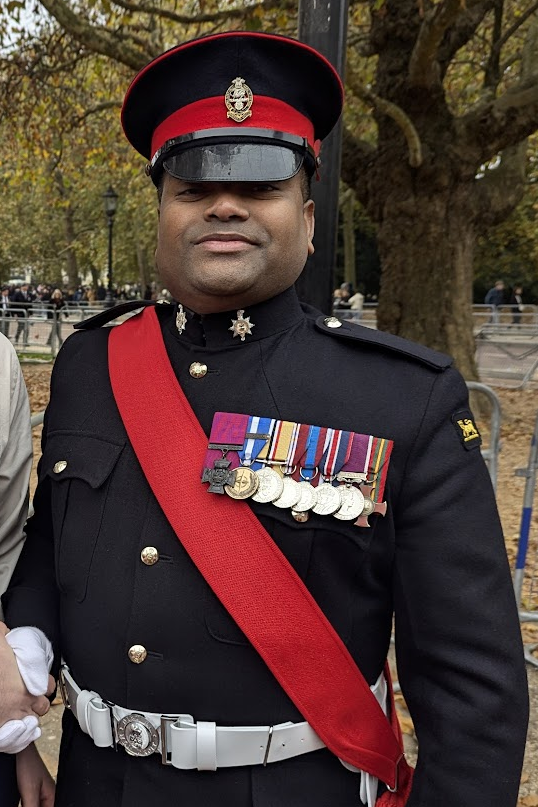
- Warrant Officer Class 1 Johnson Beharry in 2024
- Born: 26 July 1979 (age 47); Grenada
- Military career
- Allegiance: United Kingdom
- Branch: British Army
- Service years: 2001–present
- Rank: Warrant Officer Class 1
- Units: Princess of Wales's Royal Regiment (2001–12); Household Division (2012–present)
- Conflicts: Kosovo War; Northern Ireland; Iraq War
- Awards: Victoria Cross; Companion of the Order of Grenada

Warrant Officer Class 1 Johnson Gideon Beharry, VC, COG (born 26 July 1979), is a British Army soldier who, on 18 March 2005, was awarded the Victoria Cross, the highest military decoration for valour in the British and Commonwealth armed forces.

Saving members of his unit, the 1st Battalion Princess of Wales's Royal Regiment, from ambushes on 1 May and again on 11 June 2004 at Al-Amarah, Iraq, Beharry sustained serious head injuries in the latter engagement.

Queen Elizabeth II formally invested him with the Victoria Cross on 27 April 2005.

== Personal life ==
Beharry was born in Grenada, and has four brothers and three sisters of Dougla (African and Indian) descent. His surname is the anglicised depiction of Bihari, originating from a region of India from which indentured labourers were brought to the Caribbean. He moved to Great Britain in 1999 and in 2002 married Lynthia née Suarlie, who is also from Grenada. The couple divorced, following which the Ministry of Defence released an official statement declaring that the trauma of his war experiences had caused difficulties in his marriage.

Beharry married secondly in London on 18 March 2013 to Mallissa Venice née Noel by whom he has three children, two boys and a girl. Beharry is an active freemason, attending London's Queensman Lodge No. 2694.

== Army career ==
Beharry joined the Princess of Wales's Royal Regiment in August 2001. After training at Catterick, he became a driver of Warrior armoured vehicles in C Company, 1st Battalion. Before serving in Iraq, he served for six months in Kosovo and three months in Northern Ireland.

=== Actions in Iraq ===
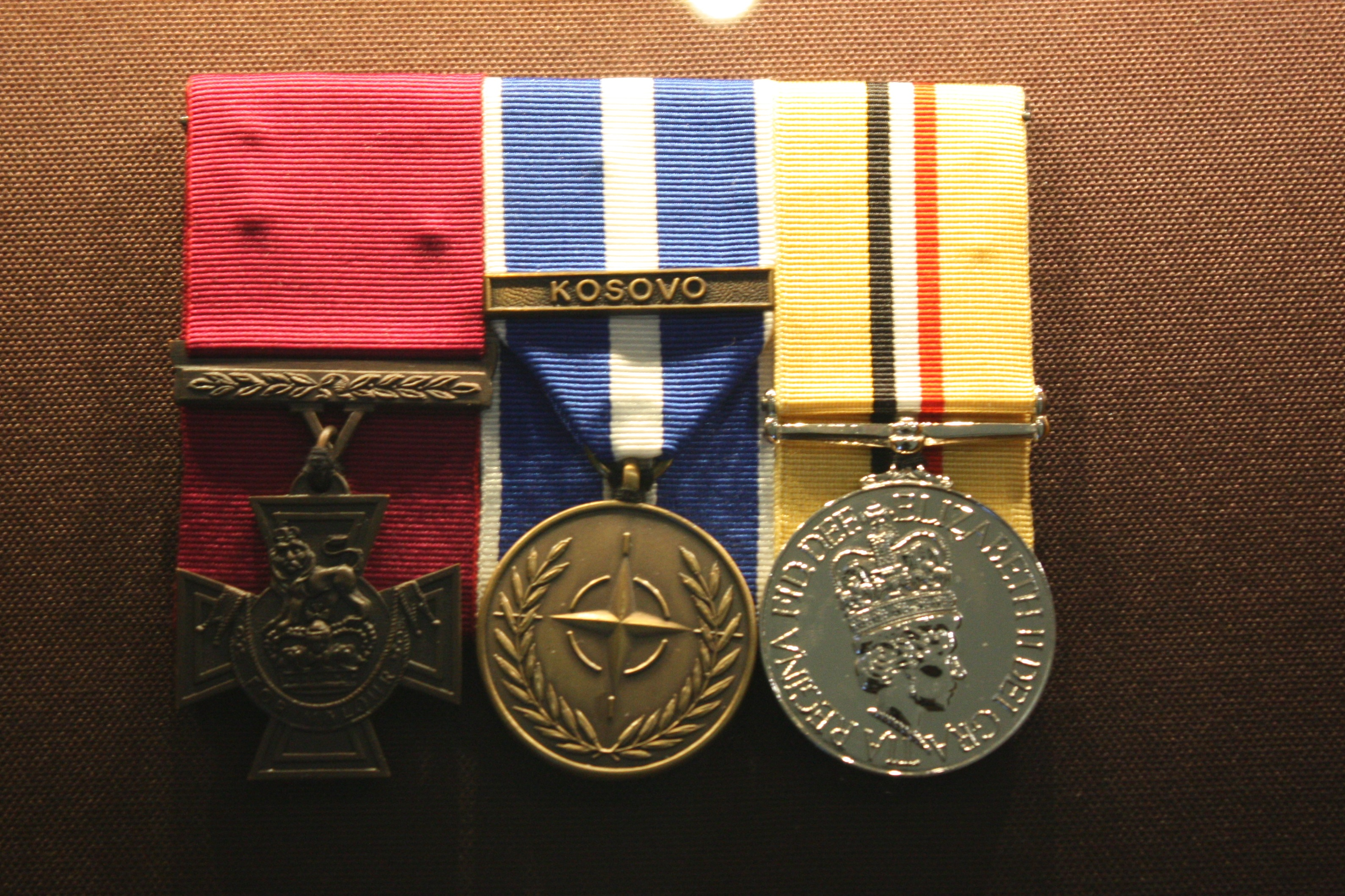
Beharry's medal group as of 2005

On 1 May 2004, Beharry was driving a Warrior Tracked Armoured Vehicle that had been called to the assistance of a foot patrol caught in a series of ambushes. The Warrior was hit by multiple rocket propelled grenades, causing damage and resulting in the loss of radio communications. The platoon commander, the vehicle's gunner and a number of other soldiers in the vehicle were wounded. Due to damage to his periscope optics, Beharry was forced to open his hatch to steer his vehicle, exposing his face and head to withering small arms fire. Beharry drove the disabled Warrior through the ambush, taking his own crew and leading five other Warriors to safety. He then extracted his wounded comrades from the vehicle, all the time exposed to further enemy fire. He was cited on this occasion for "valour of the highest order".

While back on duty on 11 June 2004, Beharry was again driving the lead Warrior of his platoon through Al Amarah when the vehicle was ambushed. A rocket propelled grenade hit the vehicle six inches from Beharry's head, and he received serious shrapnel injuries to his face and brain. Other rockets then hit the vehicle, incapacitating his commander and injuring several of the crew. Despite his life-threatening injuries, Beharry retained control of his vehicle and drove it out of the ambush area before losing consciousness. He required brain surgery for his head injuries, and he was still recovering in March 2005 when he was awarded the Victoria Cross.

=== VC citation and first living recipient since the Vietnam War ===
The full citation was published in a supplement to the London Gazette of 18 March 2005 and commented, "Private Beharry carried out two individual acts of great heroism by which he saved the lives of his comrades. Both were in direct face of the enemy, under intense fire, at great personal risk to himself (one leading to him sustaining very serious injuries)... Beharry displayed repeated extreme gallantry and unquestioned valour, despite intense direct attacks, personal injury and damage to his vehicle in the face of relentless enemy action."

Beharry became the first Victoria Cross recipient since the posthumous awards to Lieutenant Colonel H. Jones and Sergeant Ian John McKay for service in the Falklands War in 1982. He was the first living recipient of the VC since Keith Payne and Rayene Stewart Simpson, both Australian, for actions in Vietnam in 1969, and the first living recipient of the VC in the British Army since Rambahadur Limbu, a Gurkha, in the Indonesia-Malaysia confrontation in 1965. At the time of his award, he was one of only ten (Note: Including one living holder of the Victoria Cross for New Zealand, Willie Apiata, and three living recipients of the Victoria Cross for Australia, Mark Donaldson, Ben Roberts-Smith and Daniel Keighran.) living recipients of the VC.

=== Post-active military service ===
As of 23 September 2006, as a result of his injuries, he still had severe pain in his back and head. Beharry continued to be financially supported by the Army but was unfit for duty due to the serious nature of his injuries in combat.

On 26 September 2006 he was promoted to the rank of lance corporal.

In February 2007 his portrait was presented to the National Portrait Gallery in London by the artist Emma Wesley and has since become part of the gallery's collection.

On 3 September 2007 Beharry visited the veterans mental health charity Gardening Leave to open the Poppy Collection.

On 19 May 2007 Beharry carried the FA Cup onto the pitch at the new Wembley Stadium before the final between Chelsea and Manchester United.

On 11 November 2008 Beharry served as an escort to 110-year-old Harry Patch, then one of only three remaining British survivors of the First World War, at The Cenotaph in London's Whitehall to commemorate the 90th anniversary of the signing of the armistice which ended that conflict. On 11 November 2009, Beharry, and Mark Donaldson—the first recipient of the Victoria Cross for Australia (though not the first Australian recipient of the Victoria Cross)—handed a wreath to the Queen during a service in Westminster Abbey which marked the deaths in 2009 of the last three veterans of the First World War resident in the United Kingdom, Bill Stone, Henry Allingham and Harry Patch. The wreath was then laid on the Tomb of the Unknown Warrior.

In December 2008 he drove his car into a lamppost at 100 mph in a suicide attempt, depressed and haunted by nightmares of his time in Iraq. He escaped unharmed and sought help from the organization Combat Stress. He later spoke out urging similarly affected veterans to seek help.

On 30 April 2010 Beharry visited Duke of York's Royal Military School to take the salute at parade and to present the Baroness Thatcher Sword of Honour to the JUO of the winning Guard at Drill Competition. The Sword of Honour was first presented by Baroness Thatcher the previous year. He took time to talk to pupils on parade and visited the boys of Roberts House.

On 1 June 2012 Beharry was promoted to corporal and transferred to a public relations role with the Household Division. He therefore held the appointment of lance sergeant, as do all corporals serving in the Household Division.

On 30 June 2012 Beharry carried the torch for the 2012 Summer Olympics through the National Memorial Arboretum in Alrewas.

In addition to still serving in the army within the London District, he is now very active with his charitable foundation set up on 5 September 2014. The JBVC Foundation supports youths in getting away from gang culture and helps rehabilitate former offenders, helping with training and getting them into sustainable employment in the future.

He was part of the delegation receiving the then-Prince of Wales and Duchess of Cornwall during their 2019 royal visit to Grenada, where he spoke of the royal family’s important and unifying role. He also defended the royal family against accusations of racism by Meghan, Duchess of Sussex in 2021 after her and Prince Harry’s interview with Operah Winfrey.

At the 2022 State Funeral of Elizabeth II Beharry pushed the wheelchair of Warrant Officer Class 2 Keith Payne, VC, AM.

His current rank as of March 2024 is Warrant Officer Class 1 (Sergeant-Major).

At the Coronation of Charles III and Camilla, Beharry was the Standard-Bearer for Grenada in the procession of Commonwealth officials.

== Publishing deal ==
On 18 September 2005 it was reported in the press that Beharry had obtained a publishing deal worth £1.5 million to write an autobiography of his experiences. His book, entitled Barefoot Soldier, was ghostwritten in collaboration with Nick Cook and was published in October 2006.

== Media coverage ==
Beharry was interviewed for the 2006 television docudrama Victoria Cross Heroes which also included archive footage and dramatisations of his actions.

According to The Daily Telegraph, a planned 90-minute drama about Beharry was cancelled by the BBC in 2007 allegedly for being too positive about his military service and might alienate members of the audience opposed to the Iraq war.

Beharry then spoke out on BBC News on 28 February 2009 criticising the lack of support for ex-servicemen and women suffering from mental health problems, and revealing his own ongoing flashbacks and other symptoms.

From 9 January to 20 March 2011, Beharry competed in the 2011 season of Dancing on Ice. He was partnered with Canadian ice-skater, Jodeyne Higgins, and reached the semi-finals, broadcast on 20 March 2011.

In 2013 a portrait was painted of Beharry in the first series of Artist of the Year by Nick Lord.

On 11 November 2012 Beharry appeared on the Aled Jones Radio 2 show.

On 28 October 2016 Beharry appeared on the BBC cookery show Great British Menu where he, along with other recipients of honours from Elizabeth II, was guest at a banquet honouring Great Britons who had been honoured with the OBE during Queen Elizabeth II's reign.

On 11 September 2023, Beharry attended the opening ceremony of the National Army Cadet Force Museum, in the Octavia Hill Birthplace House. While at the museum, Beharry was interviewed about his history with the military and his own conversations with the cadets present at the opening ceremony.

On June 26, 2026, he opened the annual Tankfest at The Tank Museum, and drove the Warrior that he had been driving in the actions that led to his VC.

== Military decorations and campaign medals ==

Country	Date	Appointment	Ribbon	Post-nominal letters	Notes
United Kingdom	18 March 2005	Victoria Cross		VC	For valour in Iraq
United Kingdom	29 May 2012	Queen Elizabeth II Diamond Jubilee Medal			
United Kingdom	4 October 2016	Medal for Long Service and Good Conduct (Military)			For 15 years regular army service
Grenada	2017	Companion of the Order of Grenada		COG	
United Kingdom	6 February 2022	Queen Elizabeth II Platinum Jubilee Medal			
United Kingdom	6 May 2023	King Charles III Coronation Medal			
United Kingdom		NATO Medal for Kosovo			For service in Kosovo
United Kingdom		Iraq Medal			

Beharry served three months in Northern Ireland during the firefighters' strike, when he manned a fire tender. As such he was not engaged in military operational service in Northern Ireland and did not qualify for the General Service Medal (GSM) with Northern Ireland clasp.

=== Civilian honours ===
In addition to his military decorations, WO2 Beharry has also been awarded:

- Honorary Doctorate of Engineering (Hon. DEng) from the University of Sussex (22 July 2011);
- Freedom of the Borough of Southwark (12 May 2012);
- Freedom of the Borough of Hounslow (17 September 2014).

== See also ==
- Grenadian involvement in the world wars
