= Gardening Leave =

British horticultural therapy charity (2007–2015)

- Founded: 2007; 19 years ago
- Defunct: 2015; 11 years ago
- Type: Charitable organisation
- Registration no.: England and Wales: 1119786 (as Gardening Leave Limited); Scotland: SC038563 (as Gardening Leave Limited)
- Purpose: To provide horticultural therapy for men and women (serving or formerly serving in the British Armed Forces) who are suffering mental health problems.
- Region served: United Kingdom
- Revenue: £327,452 (2013)
- Employees: 15 (2013)

Gardening Leave was a British registered horticultural therapy charity that focused on the mental health of British Armed Forces veterans. It supported veterans with a wide range of mental health conditions including depression, anxiety and posttraumatic stress disorder (PTSD). Through horticultural therapy sessions, the charity aimed to maximise a veteran's physical, psychological and social strength, and enhance general health and well-being.

Gardening Leave was founded in March 2007 and opened its headquarters and first project at Auchincruive, Scotland. On 3 September 2007, Lance Corporal Johnson Beharry opened the Poppy Collection at the Ayr site. The organisation also ran projects at Glasgow's Erskine Hospital and London's Royal Hospital Chelsea, and an outreach project in East Acton. It announced plans to open a new project in Dundee in 2015.

The charity closed at the end of 2015 following shortfalls in income.

== Horticultural therapy ==
"Horticultural therapy is a professionally conducted client-centred treatment modality that utilises horticultural activities to meet specific therapeutic or rehabilitative goals of its participants. The focus is to maximise social, cognitive, physical and/or psychological functioning and/or to enhance general health and wellbeing."

== Present work ==
In 2014 Gardening Leave launched an Honesty campaign, using the honesty plant seed head as its emblem, to raise awareness of stigma surrounding veterans' mental health.

As of October 2014, the chairman of Gardening Leave is Luke Borwick and the chief executive officer is Heather Budge-Reid.
