= George Blackman =

- Born: 1897; Barbados
- Died: 22 April 2003 (aged 105–106)
- Military career
- Allegiance: United Kingdom
- Branch: British Army
- Unit: 4th British West Indies Regiment
- Conflicts: First World War

George Blackman (1897 – 22 April 2003) was born in Barbados and served as a private in the 4th British West Indies Regiment during the First World War. Following the death of former Jamaican soldier Eugent Clarke in 2002, George Blackman was the last living man from the Caribbean who was known to have served in the Great War.

Black soldiers from the British Empire rarely saw front-line action during the First World War; they were usually assigned logistical or support roles for their white comrades. Blackman, however, saw action against the Germans and the Ottoman Turks, fighting hand-to-hand in many cases, before returning to Barbados via the British base in Taranto, Italy.

After his return, Blackman was given no support from the government. He worked as a labourer for the remainder of his career.

On 6 November 2002 Blackman was featured in an article in The Guardian entitled "There were no parades for us", which highlighted the plight of soldiers from the British Empire who served in the World Wars, and who received little recognition from the British government for doing so. A few months after this article was published, he died in Barbados.

== See also ==
- Stanley Stair
- List of last surviving World War I veterans by country
