= SS Ventnor =

Ship which sank off New Zealand in 1902

Coordinates: 35.59°S 173.2°E

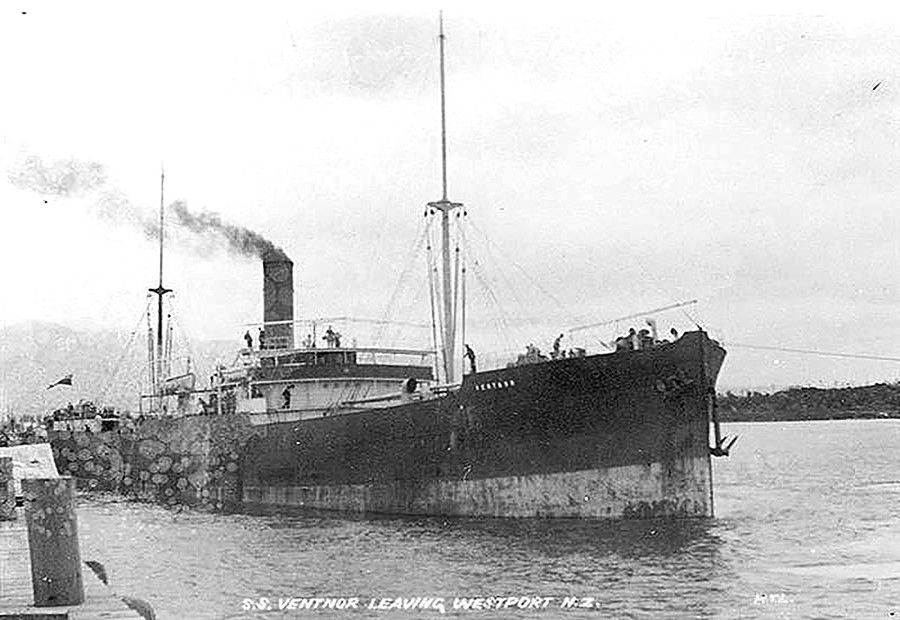
- Ventnor leaving Westport, NZ in 1901

History

United Kingdom
- Name: Ventnor
- Namesake: Ventnor
- Owner: Ventnor SS Co Ltd
- Operator: Gow, Harrison & Co
- Port of registry: Glasgow
- Builder: Russell & Co, Port Glasgow
- Launched: 23 January 1901
- Identification: UK official number 113936; code letters SFKN
- Fate: Wrecked 28 October 1902

General characteristics
- Type: Cargo ship
- Tonnage: 3,961 GRT, 2,581 NRT, 6,400 DWT
- Length: 344.7 ft (105.1 m)
- Beam: 49.8 ft (15.2 m)
- Draught: 18 ft 0 in (5.49 m)
- Depth: 25.7 ft (7.8 m)
- Installed power: 346 NHP
- Propulsion: triple-expansion engine
- Speed: 10 knots (19 km/h)
- Crew: 31

SS Ventnor was a British cargo steamship that was built in Scotland in 1901 and wrecked off New Zealand in 1902 with the loss of 13 of her crew. Her cargo included the bodies of 499 gold miners who had died in New Zealand and were being repatriated to China. The wreck led to an end of the practice of exhuming human remains en masse in New Zealand and returning them to China.

== Building ==
Russell & Co built Ventnor in its Kingston shipyard at Port Glasgow for Gow, Harrison & Co of Glasgow. She was launched on 23 January 1901. Her registered length was 344.7 ft (105.1 m), her beam was 49.8 ft (15.2 m) and her depth was 25.7 ft (7.8 m). Her tonnages were 3,961 GRT, 2,581 NRT and 6,400 DWT.

Rankin & Blackmore of Greenock built her three-cylinder triple-expansion engine, which was rated at 346 NHP and gave Ventnor a speed of 10 knots (19 km/h).

Gow, Harrison & Co created separate one-ship companies to own each of its ships. The Ventnor Steamship Company owned Ventnor, but Gow, Harrison managed her. Ventnor was registered in Glasgow. Her UK official number was 113936 and her code letters were SFKN.

== Final voyage ==
The charitable association Cheong Sing Tong chartered Ventnor to return the remains of 499 bodies exhumed from 40 cemeteries in New Zealand to their homes in southern China. These men, mostly gold miners, were from the Poon Yu and Jung Seng districts of Guangdong Province. Nine elderly Chinese were also on board as "coffin attendants", caring for the bones during the transit back to China. The rest of her cargo was listed as "5,347 tons of coal for the Admiralty at Hong Kong, 144 sacks and 22 bales of fungus, one bale of tow and one bale of flax".

Ventnor left Wellington for Hong Kong on 26 October 1902. At about 12:30 am on the morning of October 27 she became stuck on a reef off the south coast of Cape Egmont. She freed herself under her own power, but water was leaking into her number one hold. However, Wellington had no suitable dockyard to repair her, so her Master, HG Ferry, decided to continue to Auckland instead of returning or heading for New Plymouth or Manukau Harbour.

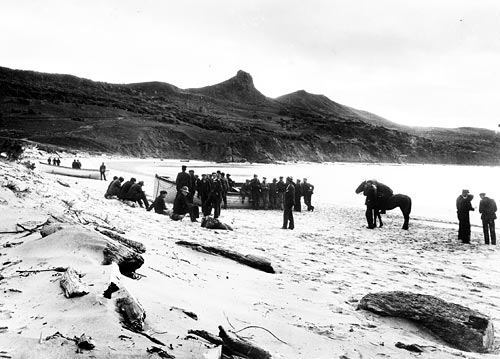
Lifeboats from Ventnor ashore after she sank

Water rose in the number one hold faster than her pumps could remove it, causing Ventnor to settle by the head. By evening on the next day she was unmanageable, her ballast tanks were full, and she was sinking. All hands were ordered to abandon ship, and she sank about 9 nautical miles (16 km) off the coast, in 147 m (482 ft) of water, near Hokianga Heads soon after 9:00 pm on 28 October. Two lifeboats, one commanded by the First Officer, reached Ōmāpere beach. A third lifeboat later reached land safely, but another capsized drowning 13 people including Captain Ferry and five of the nine elderly Chinese. None of the Chinese bodies was recovered at first.

== Aftermath ==
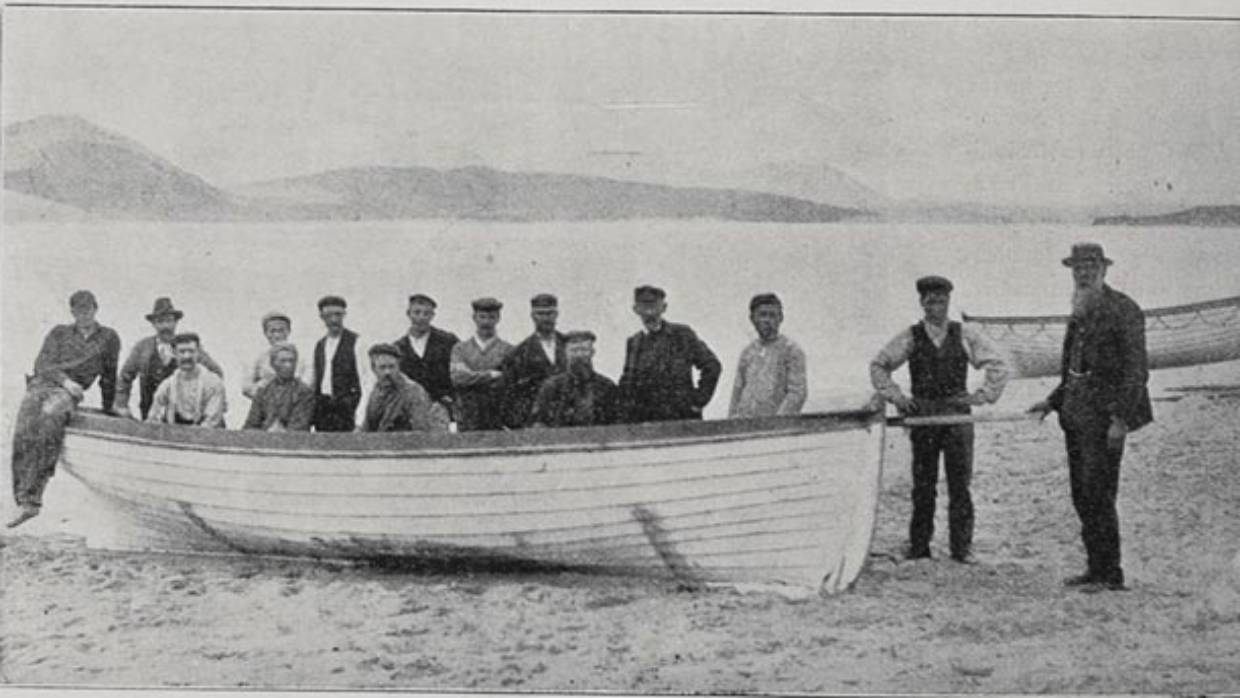
14 survivors and (right) a local resident with the first two lifeboats to reach the shore

The conclusion of a magisterial inquiry given on 19 November 1902 found that the sinking occurred due to either negligence or incompetence. It was found that drunkenness could not be proven and that while Captain Ferry made good decisions after striking the reef, the blame for the striking lay with him alone.

Over the next few months after the sinking, the remains of the Chinese gold miners began to be washed ashore. The local Māori tribes (Te Roroa and Te Rarawa) buried their remains near their own burial grounds. Cheong Shing Tong chartered the Energy to try to find the wreck and recover the bodies, but the wreck remained lost for over 100 years. Remains were repatriated to China for many years after the sinking on an individual basis, but the Ventnor was the last attempt at a mass shipment.

== Commemorations and monuments ==
In 2007 a connection was formalised between the descendants of the Chinese gold miners and the iwi Te Roroa and Te Rarawa. A grove of 22 kauri trees were planted at the Waipoua Visitors Centre in the Waipoua Forest and a Chinese-inspired gate was constructed in the urupa at Mitimiti to memorialise the sinking. The wreck was discovered in 2012 and is now a National Heritage Site.

In 2010 Renee Liang wrote a play, The Bone Feeder, about the story of the Ventnor. In 2017 she turned the script into a libretto for an opera of the same name, with music composed by Gareth Farr to a libretto written by Renee Liang. It includes text in the English, Cantonese and Māori languages.

In June 2020 a documentary crew caused controversy by filming the wreck.

On 10 April 2021, a public monument was officially unveiled outside the Manea Footprints of Kupe Experience in Opononi. This monument lists the names of those onboard who drowned and also the 499 who were to be repatriated. It also gives thanks to Te Roroa, Te Rarawa and the people of Hokianga for the ongoing respect and care shown to the bones which washed up on the beaches 119 years earlier. In attendance were descendants of Choie Sew Hoy and Ng Jor Ching, currently the only two people with known living descendants out of all the Chinese that were on board. The white lion used in the lion dance minutes earlier was burned as an offering to the heavens as part of Ching Ming festivities in what was claimed to be a New Zealand first.

== See also ==
- Charles Sew Hoy
