= Mitimiti =

- Location within Northland Region
- Coordinates: 35°25′30″S 173°16′15″E
- Country: New Zealand
- Region: Northland Region
- District: Far North District

Mitimiti is a small settlement in Northland, New Zealand. It lies close to the Warawara Forest, between the mouths of the Whangape Harbour and Hokianga Harbour on Northland's west coast, 44 km west of Kohukohu. Mitimiti is part of the Hokianga North statistical area. For demographics of this area, see Panguru.

== Name ==
There are several stories about the origin of the name Mitimiti.

The name "Mitimiti" is thought to come from a Māori term meaning "to lick", a reference to the belief that the souls of the dead, on their way to Cape Reinga, paused here to drink at the mouth of the Mitimiti Stream.

Another story is that the great chief More Te Korohanga was slain in a battle there. The warriors wanted a piece of the chief, but there wasn't enough of his body for everyone, so they licked his blood from the rocks there.

== History ==
=== SS Ventnor ===
On 27 October 1902, the SS Ventnor sank near the Hokianga Heads. The ship was carrying the remains of 499 Chinese miners back to China, however, none of the Chinese bodies were recovered initially.

For weeks and months following the wreck, bones washed ashore along the Hokianga, including on the beach at Mitimiti. Locals, unsure of the origins of the bones, buried them in their cemeteries. In 2007, Chinese settlers began to make links between the story of the SS Ventnor and the bones, and official relationships between Te Rarawa and The New Zealand Chinese Association were formed.

In 2013, a memorial gateway was unveiled in the cemetery in Mitimiti, to honor the sinking. It was blessed by both Māori and Chinese

== Notable people ==
Artist Ralph Hotere was born in Mitimiti in 1931, and was buried there in 2013. He also attended Matihetihe school.

Poet Hone Tuwhare wrote poem A fall of rain at Mitimiti: Hokianga which was published in 1974 in his collection Something Nothing.
