= SS Verdala =

Scottish-built steamship

History
- Name: 1913: Verdala; 1917: Mongolian Prince; 1928: Istok; 1940: Maycrest
- Namesake: 1913: Fort Verdala; 1928: Istok
- Owner: 1913: Verdala SS Co; 1917: Prince Line; 1928: Atlantska Plovidba Ivo Racić; 1929: Jugoslavenski Lloyd; 1940: Crest Shipping Co
- Operator: 1913: Gow, Harrison & Co; 1917: Furness, Withy & Co; 1928: Atlantska Plovidba Ivo Racić; 1929: Jugoslavenski Lloyd; 1940: Ivanović & Co
- Port of registry: 1913: (United Kingdom) Glasgow; 1917: (United Kingdom) Newcastle; 1928: (Kingdom of Yugoslavia) Dubrovnik; 1940: (United Kingdom) London
- Builder: Russell & Co, Port Glasgow
- Yard number: 646
- Launched: 14 March 1913
- Completed: April 1913
- Identification: UK official number 133113; code letters: 1913: JCBW; 1928: JIPX; call sign: 1934: YTBN; 1940: GNBV
- Fate: scuttled 4 August 1944

General characteristics
- Type: Cargo ship
- Tonnage: 1914: 5,880 GRT, 3,725 NRT; 1934: 5,904 GRT, 3,713 NRT; 1942: 5,923 GRT, 3,703 NRT
- Length: 423.5 ft (129.1 m)
- Beam: 56.0 ft (17.1 m)
- Draught: 25 ft 4 in (7.72 m)
- Depth: 28.7 ft (8.7 m)
- Decks: 2
- Installed power: 537 NHP
- Propulsion: triple-expansion engine
- Troops: 1,140
- Armament: DEMS
- Notes: sister ships: Volumnia, Veturia, Vestalia, Valetta, Vimeira

SS Verdala was a cargo and passenger steamship that was built in Scotland in 1913. Several times she changed owners and was renamed: as Mongolian Prince in 1917, Istok in 1928 and finally Maycrest in 1940.

The ship served in the UK Merchant Navy in the First World War as Verdala and Mongolian Prince, and in the Second World War as Maycrest. She was in Yugoslav ownership from 1928 and was registered in Dubrovnik as Istok from 1928 until 1940.

In the Second World War Maycrest served in the Battle of the Atlantic from 1940 until 1943, and in the Mediterranean theatre in the first half of 1944. In August 1944 she was scuttled off the coast of Normandy to form part of a breakwater for a mulberry harbour for Operation Overlord.

== Building ==
In the 1910s Russell & Co of Port Glasgow built a series of sister ships for Gow, Harrison & Co, a tramp shipping company based in Glasgow. Volumnia and Veturia were launched in 1911, Vestalia and Valetta in 1912, Verdala in 1913 and Vimeira in 1914.

Russell & Co built Verdala as yard number 646 in its Kingston shipyard. She was launched on 14 March 1913 and completed that April. Her registered length was 423.5 ft (129.1 m), her beam was 56.0 ft (17.1 m) and her depth was 28.7 ft (8.7 m). Her tonnages were 5,880 GRT, 3,725 NRT. Rankin & Blackmore of Greenock built her three-cylinder triple-expansion engine, which was rated at 537 NHP.

Gow, Harrison & Co created separate one-ship companies to own each of its ships. The Verdala Steam Ship Co Ltd owned Verdala, but Gow, Harrison managed her. She was registered in Glasgow. Her United Kingdom official number was 133113 and her code letters were JCBW.

== First World War and interbellum ==
On 6 March 1916 Verdala left Kingston, Jamaica carrying 25 officers and 1,115 other ranks of the Third Jamaica Contingent to serve in Europe in the First World War. Because of enemy submarine activity the Admiralty ordered Verdala to proceed via Halifax, Nova Scotia, where she could join an eastbound transatlantic convoy.

On her way to Halifax, Verdala was caught in a blizzard. Her troop accommodation lacked adequate heating, and warm clothing for the voyage had not been issued to the troops. By the time she reached Halifax, about 600 men were suffering from frostbite and five had died.

In 1917 Prince Line bought Verdala, renamed her Mongolian Prince and registered her in Newcastle. Prince Line was part of the Furness, Withy group. In September 1921 Mongolian Prince sailed through the Panama Canal to inaugurate a new Prince Line route to ports on the West Coast of the United States.

In 1928 Atlantska Plovidba Ivo Racić bought Mongolian Prince, renamed her Istok and registered her in Dubrovnik. In 1929 she became part of the fleet of Jugoslavenski Lloyd. By 1930 she was equipped for wireless telegraphy. Her Yugoslav code letters were JIPX until 1934, when the call sign YTBN superseded them.

== Second World War ==
In 1940 the Crest Shipping Co bought Istok, renamed her Maycrest, registered her in London and appointed Ivanović & Co to manage her. Her UK call sign was GNBV.

From November 1940 until November 1943 Maycrest took part in transatlantic convoys. She made ten round trips between UK ports and the East Coast of the United States. On different crossings she visited Baltimore, New York, Philadelphia and Boston. She made each eastbound crossing with an SC convoy from Halifax, Nova Scotia or St John's, Newfoundland. Eastbound Maycrest usually carried pig iron, steel or general cargo. In June and July 1942 her eastbound cargo included grain. In December 1942 and January 1943 her eastbound cargo included explosives.

In January 1944 Maycrest sailed from Scotland to Gibraltar carrying coal and coke with Convy OS 65 km. She visited Lisbon, Oran and Melilla before returning in April with a cargo of iron ore via Gibraltar and Convoy XK15.

Maycrest's final voyage was across the English Channel from Britain to Arromanches in Normandy. On 4 August 1944 she was scuttled as a corncob ship to form part of a gooseberry breakwater for Mulberry Harbour "B".

== Bibliography ==
- Burrell, David (1992). Furness Withy 1891–1991. Kendal: World Ship Society. ISBN 0-905617-70-3.
