= Julian Marryshow =

World War II fighter pilot from Grenada (1918–2012)

- Born: 1918; Grenada
- Died: 17 July 2012 (aged 93–94)
- Relatives: Theophilus Albert Marryshow (father)
- Military career
- Allegiance: United Kingdom
- Branch: Royal Air Force
- Unit: Royal Air Force Volunteer Reserve
- Conflicts: World War II
- Other work: Tourism advisor

Julian Marryshow (1918 – 17 July 2012) was a Grenadian-born Royal Air Force fighter pilot during World War II. Later, as a tourism advisor in Barbados, he was credited with having reintroduced the traditional Crop Over festival, which had a considerable influence on tourism to that country.

== Biography ==
Julian Albert Marryshow was born in Grenada (1918?), one of 17 children of Theophilus Albert Marryshow, a political activist and campaigner for a West Indies Federation. He was possibly named after Julien Fédon, a folk hero in Grenada who had led a rebellion against British rule in 1795. Marryshow senior had encouraged people from the Caribbean to fight in World War I as members of the British West Indies Regiment, so it was perhaps no surprise that his son joined the Royal Air Force Volunteer Reserve in order to fight in World War II. Marryshow was part of the "Trinidad Air Training Scheme" and, after completing training on 6 June 1941, was posted to the 602 Squadron at Peterhead, Scotland, which was equipped with Spitfires. In this capacity, he took part in the ill-fated Dieppe Raid. He later converted to the Hawker Typhoon, a fighter-bomber, being transferred to 193 Squadron. He flew sorties during the Normandy landings (6 June 1944, onwards), and was credited with the destruction of trains and rocket-launcher sites. On 24 February 1945, his plane was hit and came down near Breda. He survived and was able to rejoin the squadron.

After the war, Marryshow obtained a place on the British government's Further Education and Vocational Training Scheme. This took him to London to study economics under the Marxist professor Harold Laski at the London School of Economics. He went on to be employed in a variety of roles in the Caribbean and elsewhere. In the early 1970s, he was running an advertising agency when the Barbados Tourist Board invited proposals for a project to make Barbadians aware of the importance of the tourism industry. After winning the contract, Marryshow eventually became a consultant to the Board. In an attempt to attract tourists to the country during the low-season months he learned of the celebration by slaves in Barbados that took place at the end of the sugar cane harvest. In 1974, he headed a committee that decided to revive the Crop Over festival, which is now held annually.

Further work in the 1980s took Marryshow to the South Pacific, where he advised the tourism boards in Tonga and the Solomon Islands. He was particularly popular in Tonga as he had a photograph of his father and Tonga’s Queen Salote, which had been taken at the Coronation of Queen Elizabeth II.

Julian Marryshow retired to his home in Christchurch, Barbados. He died on 17 July 2012.
