= British West Indies Regiment =

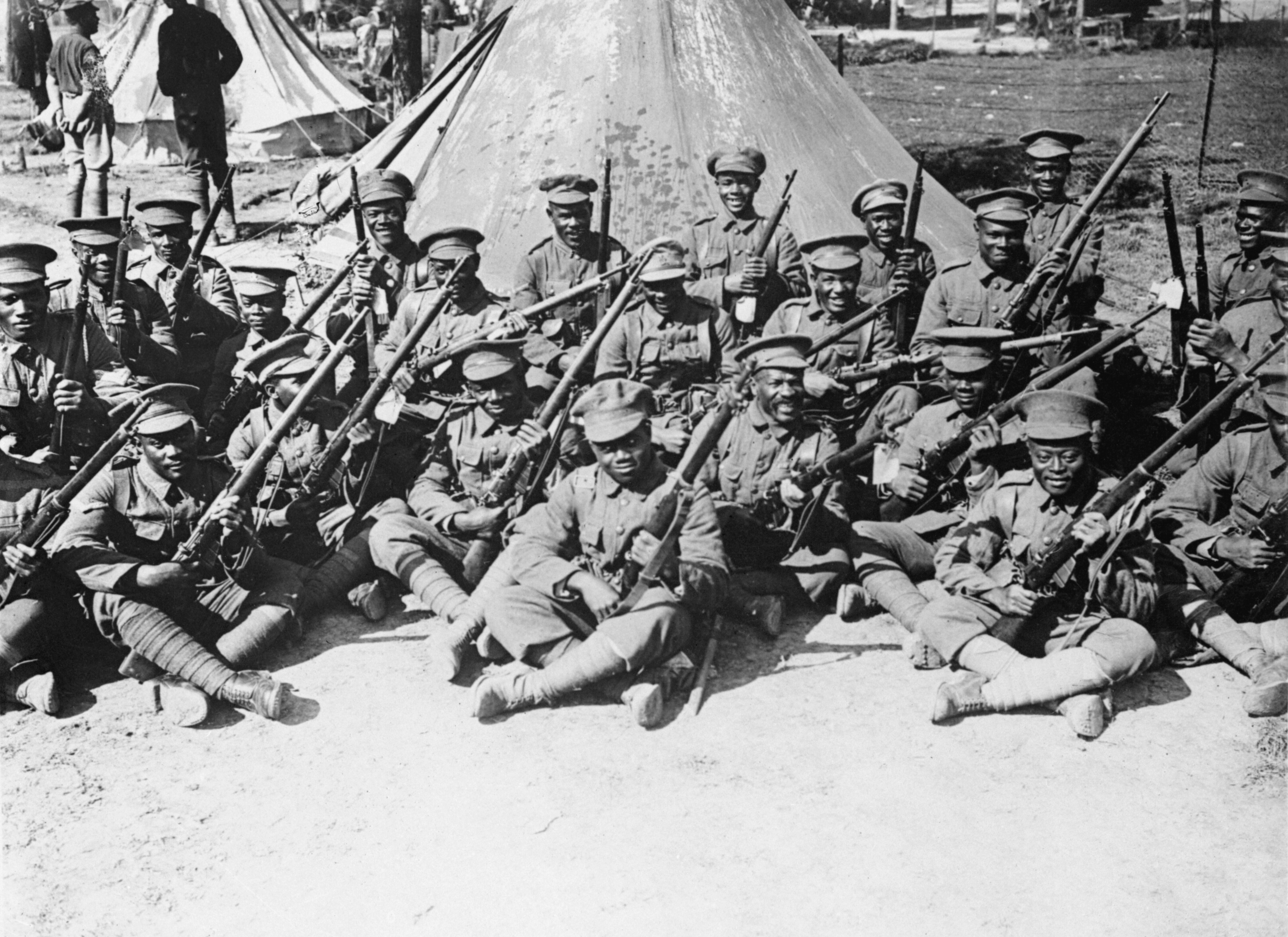
- Soldiers of the British West Indies Regiment on the Albert to Amiens Road, September 1916
- Active: 1915–1921
- Allegiance: United Kingdom
- Branch: British Army
- Role: Infantry
- Size: 15,601 (397 officers and 15,204 men)
- Engagements: World War I
- Battle honours: Messines 1917; Ypres 1917; Polygon Wood; Broodseinde; Poelcappelle; Passchendaele; Pursuit to Mons; France and Flanders 1916–18; Italy 1918; Rumani; Egypt 1916–17; Battles of Gaza; El Mughar; Nebi Samwil; Jerusalem; Jaffa; Battle of Megiddo 1918; Nablus; Palestine 1917–18

The British West Indies Regiment (1915 - 1921) (BWIR) was a unit of the British Army during the First World War, formed of volunteers from British colonies in the West Indies. The regiment was fifteen thousand strong, with two hundred and sixty two men losing their lives overseas, mostly to disease.

== History ==
=== Formation ===
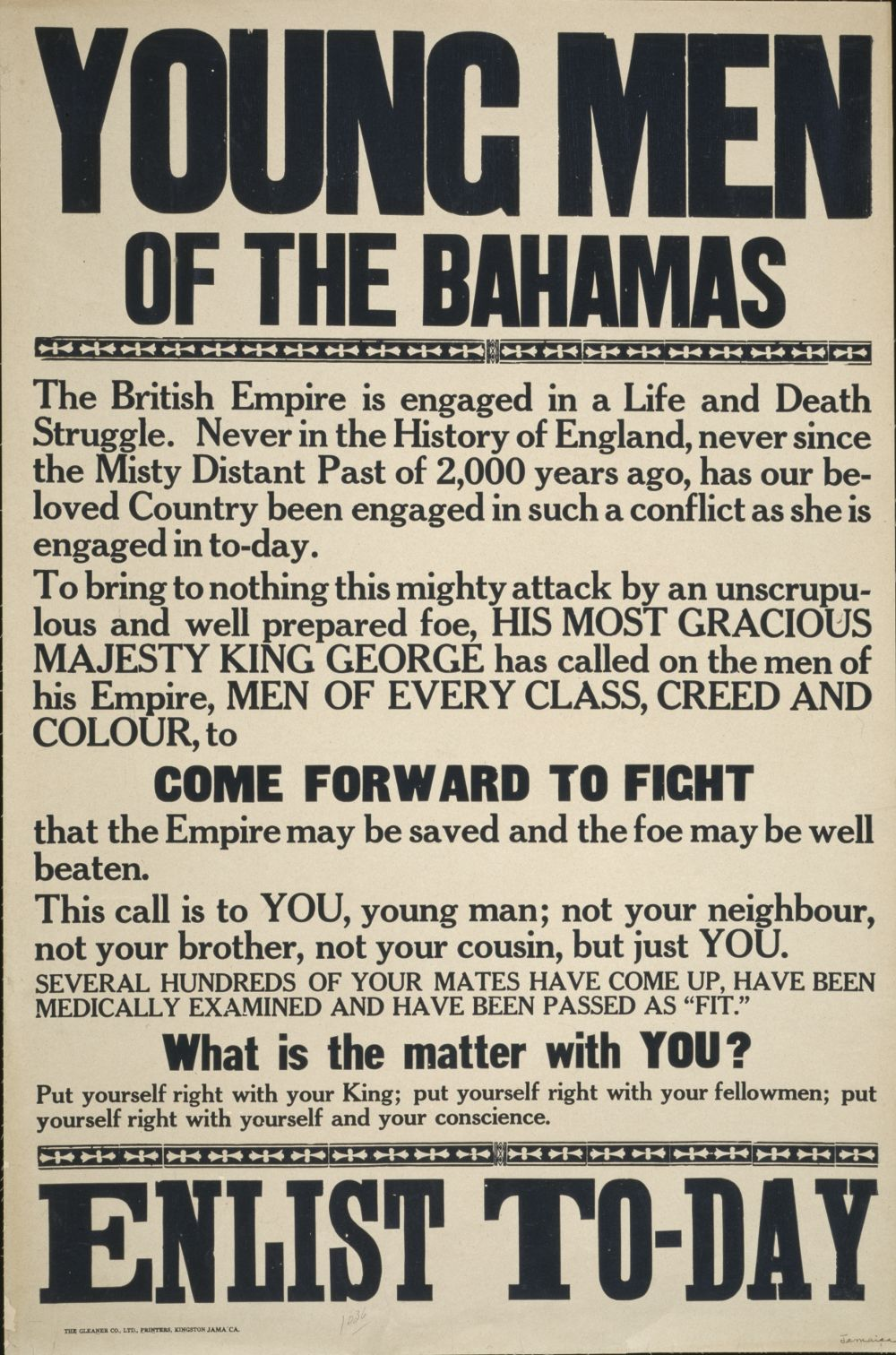
Recruitment poster from the Bahamas (1915)

In 1915 the British Army formed a second West Indies regiment from Caribbean volunteers who had made their way to Britain. Initially, these volunteers were drafted into a variety of units within the army, but in 1915 it was decided to group them together into a single regiment, named the British West Indies Regiment. The similarity of titles has sometimes led to confusion between this war-time unit and the long established West India Regiment. Both were recruited from black Caribbean volunteers and a number of officers from the WIR were transferred to the BWIR.

The 1st Battalion was formed in September 1915 at Seaford, Sussex, England. It was made up of men from:

- British Guiana—A Company.
- Trinidad—B Company.
- Trinidad and St Vincent—C Company.
- Grenada and Barbados—D Company.

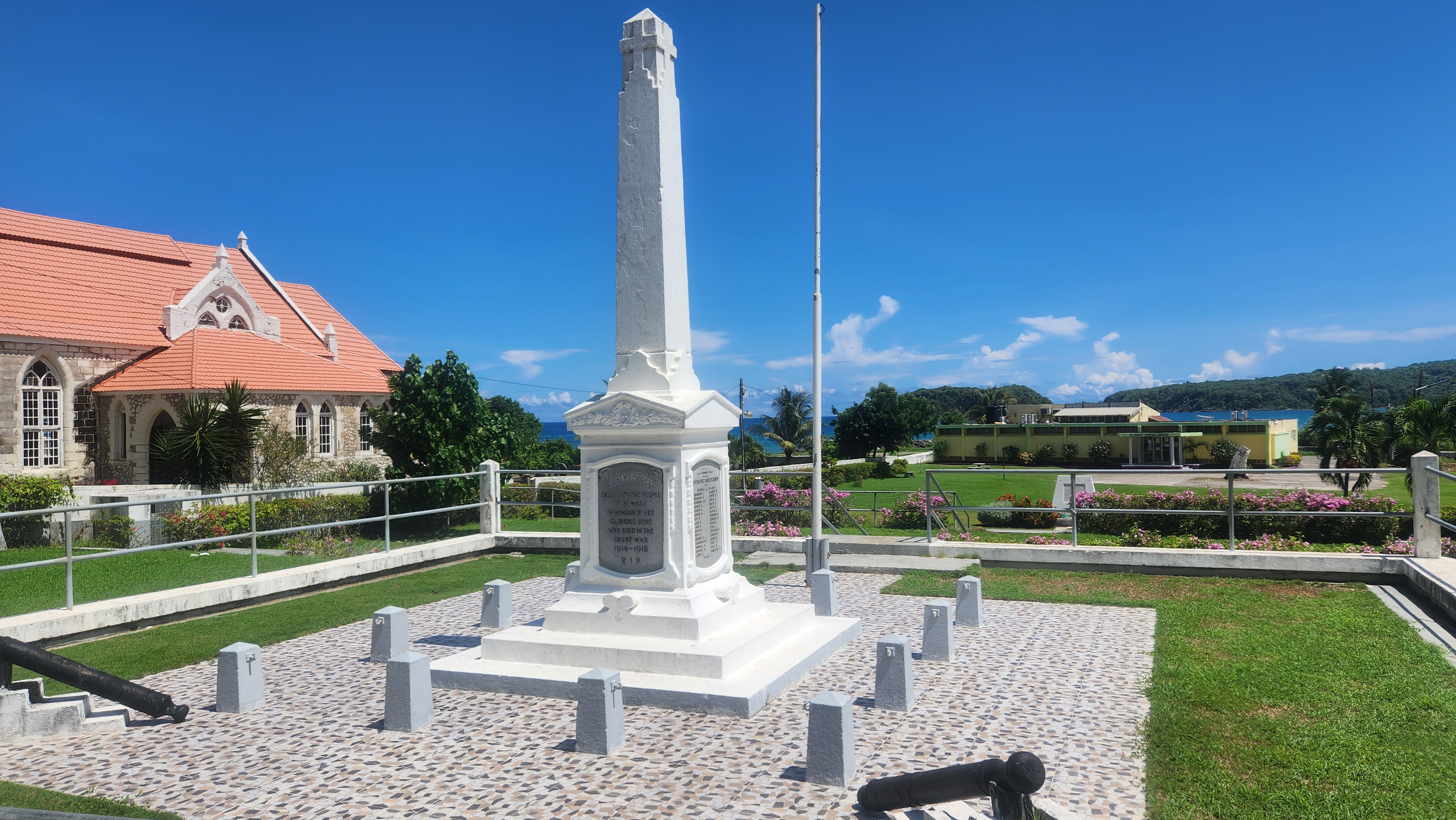
WWI Cenotaph to BWIR at Port Maria, St. Mary Parish, Jamaica

A further ten battalions were formed afterwards. High wastage led to further drafts being required from Jamaica, British Honduras and Barbados before the regiment was able to begin training. In total approximately 15,600 men served in the British West Indies Regiment. Jamaica contributed two-thirds of these volunteers, while others came from Trinidad and Tobago, Barbados, the Bahamas, British Honduras (now Belize), Grenada, British Guiana (now Guyana), the Leeward Islands, Saint Lucia and St Vincent. Nearly 5,000 more subsequently volunteered.

=== Wartime service ===
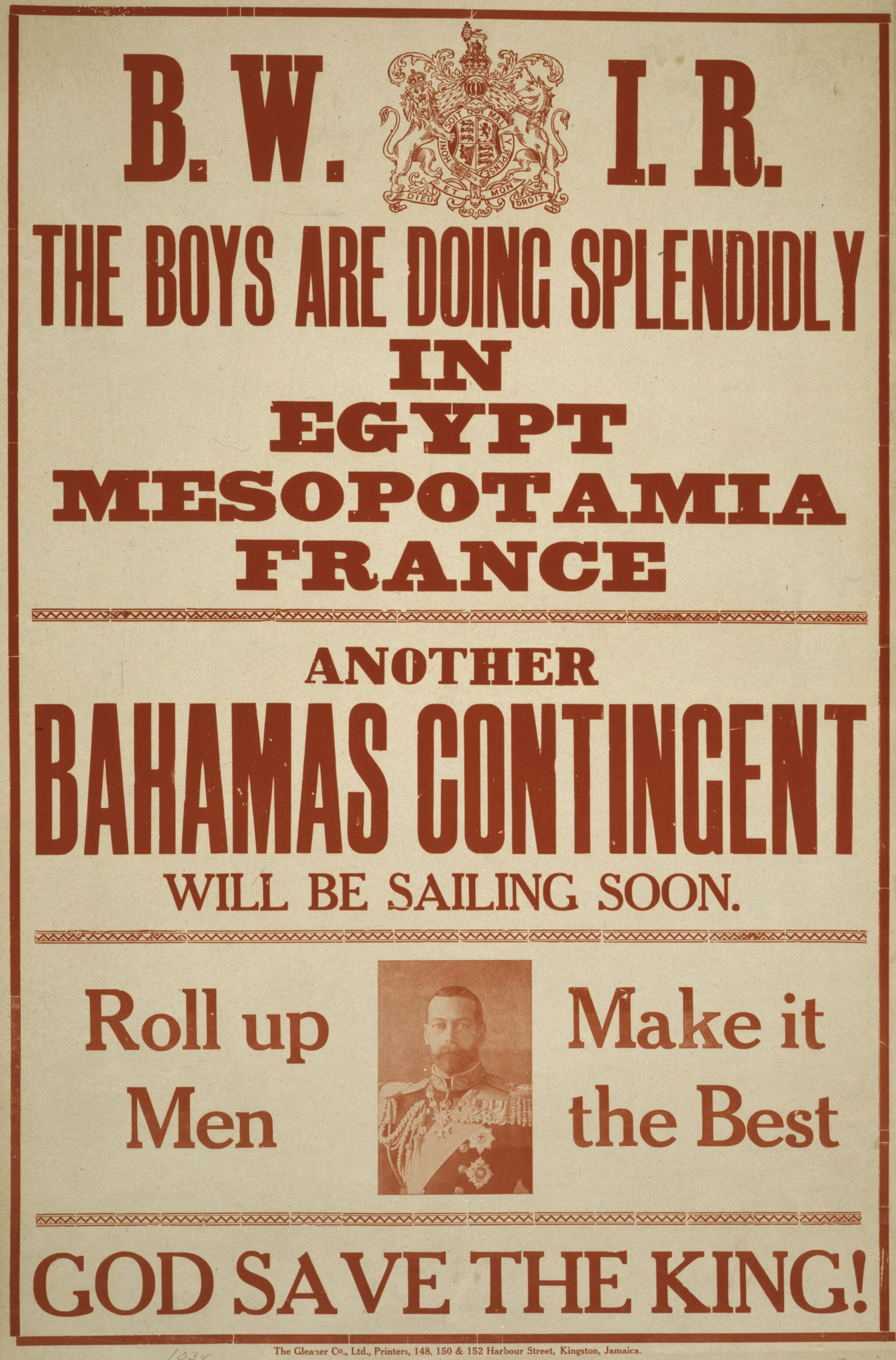
World War I recruiting poster for the "B.W.I.R."

The British West Indies Regiment played a small role in the First World War, primarily in Palestine and Jordan, where they were employed in military operations against the Ottoman Army. In one notable incident on 22 September 1918 a company of 1/BWIR assisted some New Zealand units in a 'dashing bayonet attack' which broke through the Ottoman rear guard near Jisred Damiye. During the Palestine Campaign General Allenby sent the following telegram to the Governor of Jamaica, William Manning, "I have great pleasure in informing you of the gallant conduct of the machine-gun section of the 1st British West Indies Regiment during two successful raids on the Turkish trenches. All ranks behaved with great gallantry under heavy rifle and shell fire and contributed in no small measure to the success of the operations". The 1st and 2nd Battalions served mainly in Egypt and Palestine, the 3rd, 4th, 6th and 7th Battalions served in France and Flanders, with the 5th Battalion acting as reserve draft unit. The 8th and 9th Battalions also served in France and Flanders, before being transferred to Italy in 1918, while the 10th and 11th Battalions also served in France and Italy. In 2002, one of the last surviving members of the regiment, George Blackman from Barbados, was interviewed by Simon Rogers about his time in France for The Guardian. He recounted that "It was cold. And everywhere there were white lice. We had to shave the hair there because the lice grow there. All our socks were full of white lice." Blackman was among the troops transferred to Taranto in 1918 and died in 2003, aged 105.

Two hundred and sixty two men lost their lives overseas during the conflict, 105 to enemy action and 157 dying of disease; a further 573 were wounded.

=== Taranto revolt ===
Following the Armistice in November 1918 the battalions of the BWIR were concentrated at Taranto, Italy, to prepare for demobilisation. They were still required to work; loading and unloading ships, performing labour fatigues, and building and cleaning latrines for white soldiers, all of which caused resentment, especially when they discovered that white soldiers had been awarded a pay rise which they were not. On 6 December 1918, the men of the 9th Battalion refused to obey orders, and 180 sergeants signed a petition complaining about poor pay, allowances and promotions. On 9 December, the 10th Battalion also refused to work. Over a period of four days a black NCO was killed and a lieutenant colonel assaulted. Men of the Worcestershire Regiment were sent in to restore order. The 9th Battalion was disbanded and its personnel distributed to other battalions, which were disarmed. Around 60 men were tried for mutiny, generally receiving sentences from three to five years, although one man received 20 years, and another was executed by firing squad.

Bitterness persisted after the mutiny was suppressed, and on 17 December 1918 about 60 NCOs of the BWIR met to form the Caribbean League, calling for equal rights, self-determination and closer union in the West Indies. At a meeting on 20 December, a sergeant of the 3rd Battalion stated that "the black man should have freedom and govern himself in the West Indies and that if necessary, force and bloodshed should be used to attain that object".

== Battalions ==
The battalions of the regiment included:

- 1st Btn (formed 1 October 1915)
- 2nd Btn (formed 1 January 1916)
- 3rd Btn (formed 7 January 1916)
- 4th Btn (formed 31 May 1916)
- 5th Btn (formed as a reserve battalion on 7 August 1916, converted to infantry by April 1918)
- 6th Btn (formed 30 March 1917)
- 7th Btn (formed 31 March 1917)
- 8th Btn (formed 7 July 1917)
- 9th Btn (formed 21 July 1917)
- 10th Btn (formed 26 August 1917)
- 11th Btn (formed 2 October 1917)
- 12th Btn (formed 8 December 1917)
- Reserve Btn (formed April 1918)

== Awards and memorials ==
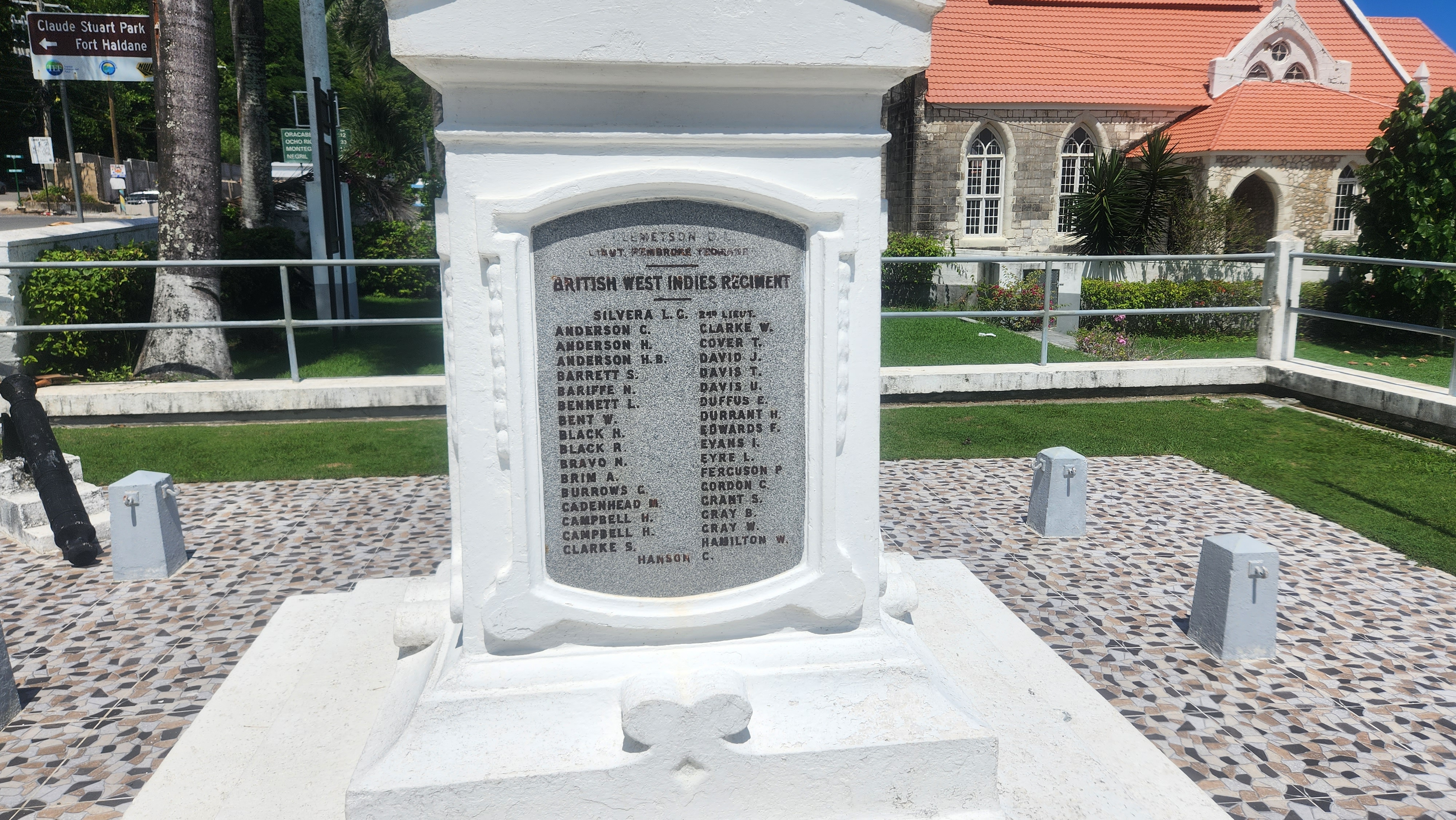
Detail of WWI Cenotaph to BWIR Port Maria, St. Mary Parish, Jamaica

During World War I the BWIR was awarded 81 medals for bravery and 49 men were mentioned in despatches.

In 2024, to honour those who served in the BWIR, a plaque was unvealed in Ypres, West Flanders, Belgium. A place were many had fought and died. The plaque was installed at St George's Memorial Church.

== See also ==
- Afro-Caribbean leftism
- George Blackman
- Gershom Browne
- Arthur Andrew Cipriani
- John Daley
- Sam Manning
- Stanley Stair
- Clennell Wickham
- Grenadian involvement in the world wars
