= Forage cap =

Designation given to various types of military undress, fatigue or working headwear

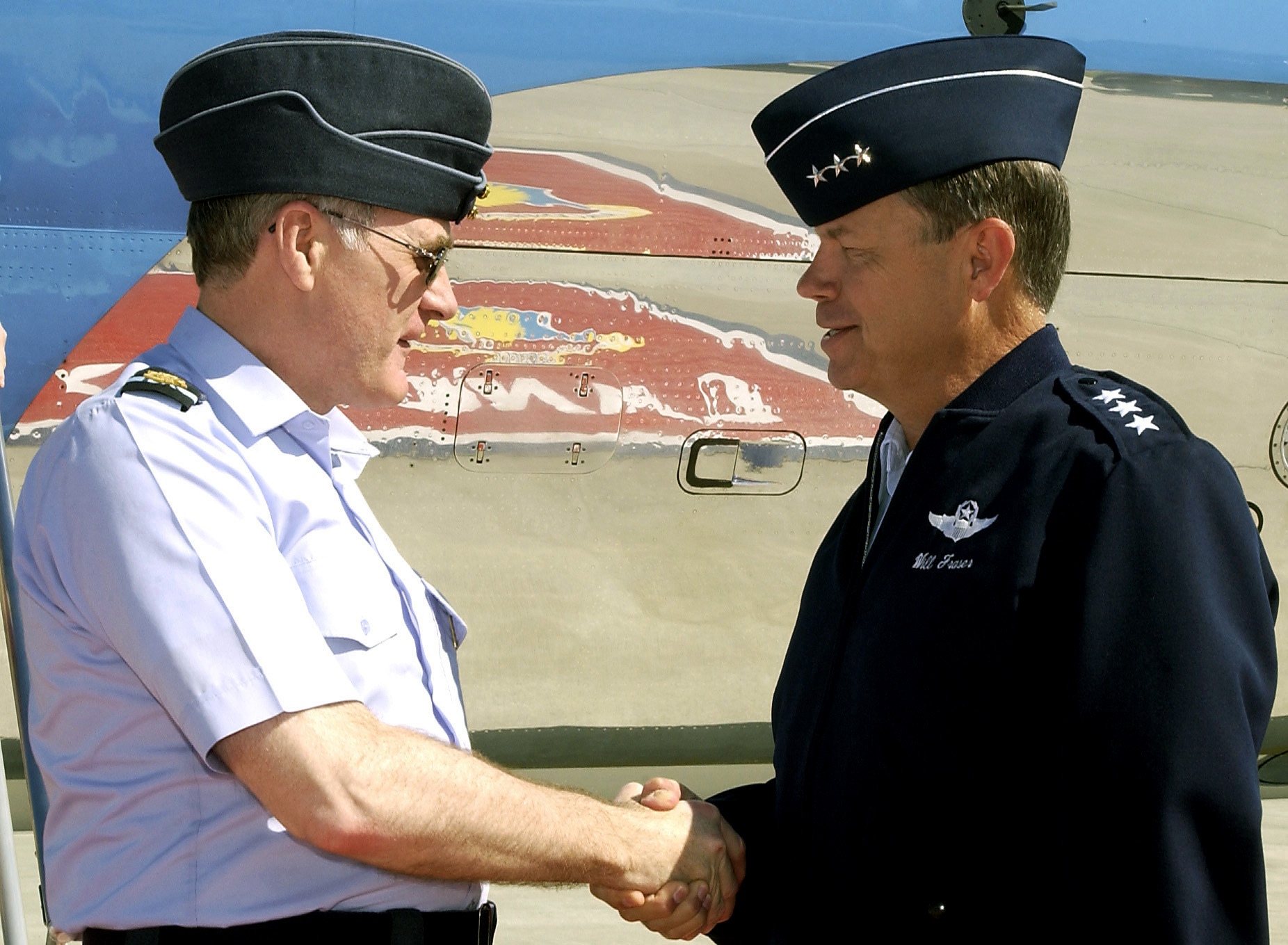
RAF (left) and USAF officer style forage caps.

Forage cap / hat is the designation given to various types of military undress, fatigue or working headwear. These vary widely in form, according to country or period. The coloured peaked cap worn by the modern British Army for parade and other dress occasions is still officially designated as a forage cap.

== History ==
In the 18th century, forage caps were small cloth caps worn by British cavalrymen when undertaking work duties such as foraging for food for their horses. The term was later applied to undress caps worn by men of all branches and regiments as a substitute for the full dress headdress.

== Usage ==
=== Finnish Army ===
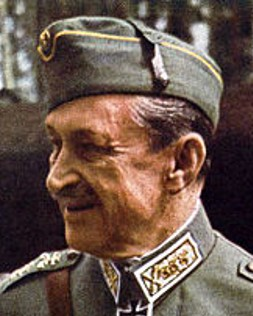
Marshal of Finland Carl Gustav Emil Mannerheim wearing a forage cap

In Finland, forage caps, historically referred as boat-shaped field hats or ylioppilaslakki / military forage caps like the m/22 Field hat and turkislakki m/22 "turkissuikka" Fur hat, are traditional military and student headwear designs from Finland.

=== French Army ===
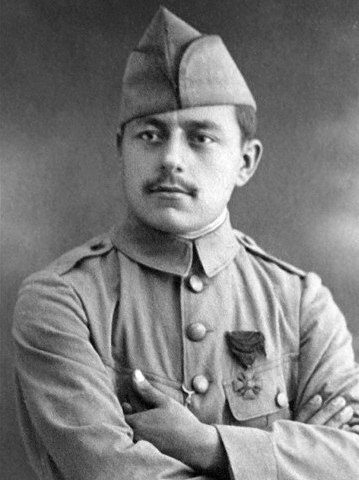
Bonnet de police worn by Louis de Cazenave, one of the last poilus.

During the French Revolutionary Wars, French soldiers made their own forage caps from the cloth of old coats. Known as the bonnet de police, these caps resembled a nightcap and were also worn by Santa Anna's army during the Mexican War. From the 1840s until World War I, French line infantry wore the blue and red kepi, but in 1915, the bonnet de police was reintroduced as a horizon blue garrison cap.

Worn in a khaki version until 1940, the bonnet de police retained the high pointed crown of 1915–1918. During World War II French forces wore a wide variety of headdresses according to supplies available. In 1945 however the bonnet de police was reintroduced for most units but with a lower crown and in the historic colours that had formerly distinguished the kepis of each branch. By the 1940s, the beret was also widely worn by paratroop and mountain units.

=== German Army ===
The German army was the first to use the peaked cap, in the final years of the Napoleonic Wars. When the Pickelhaube was introduced in the 1840s, the Germans adopted a new, peakless forage cap, resembling the sailor cap. Prior to 1914 these caps were worn in a wide variety of colours according to regiment or branch, with Prussian blue the most common. However, in 1917 these were replaced with a slate grey version, with a dark green cap band. After World War I, the German Wehrmacht used a variant of the garrison cap called the Feldmütze, before adopting the Austrian-style ski cap of the Gebirgsjäger.

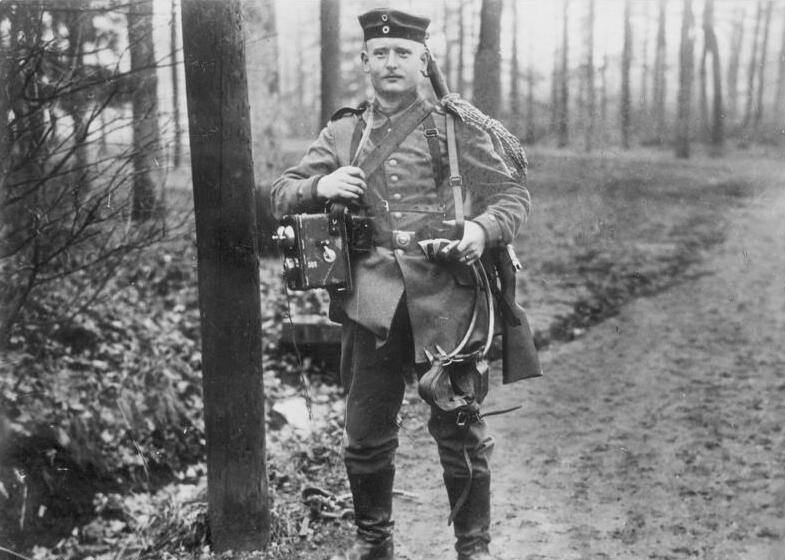
German peakless forage cap of WWI, based on the type worn by sailors.

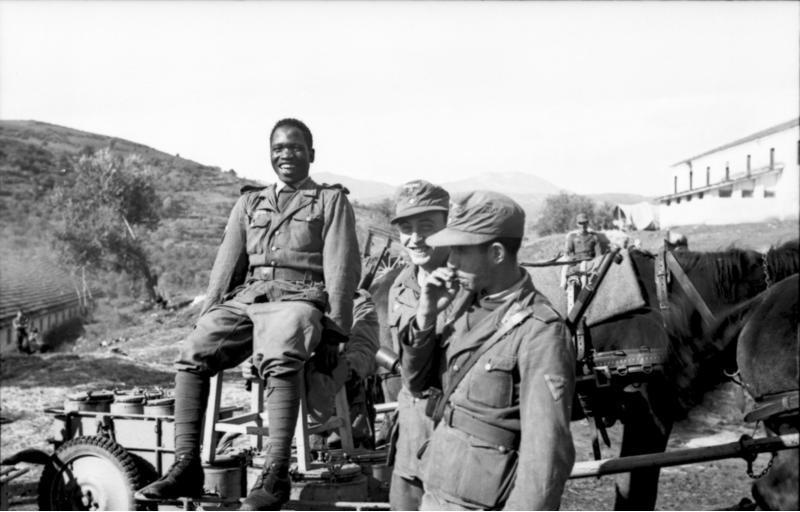
Three German Second World War soldiers, two wearing forage caps

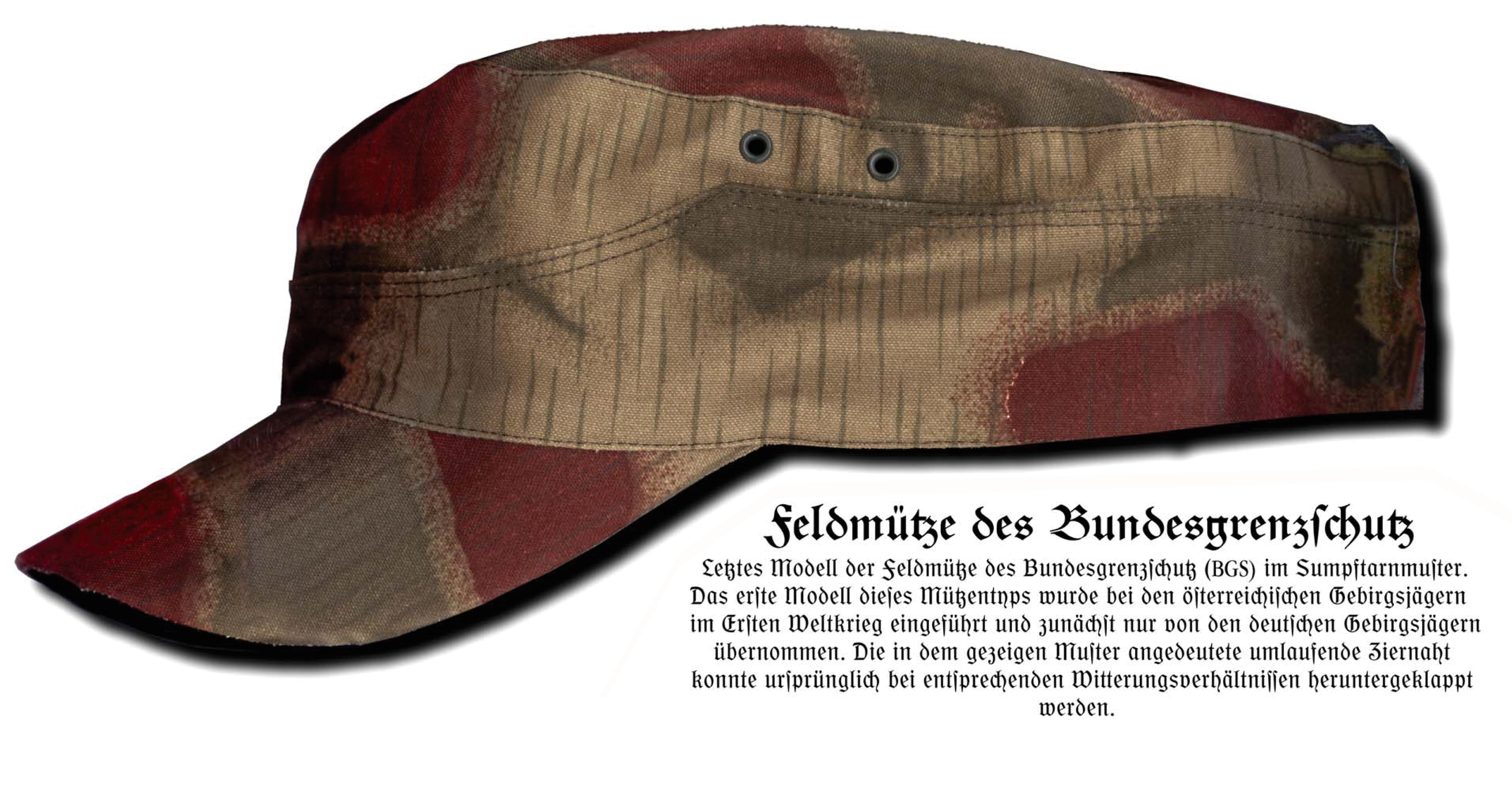
Bundesgrenzschutz (Federal Border Guard) Feldmütze cap, in use until 1976

=== Greek Army ===
In Greece forage caps were adopted during the period of the First World War, when most of the weapons and supplies were of French origin. From then until World War II, various changes were made while keeping key features. The Greek Army Regulations of 1938 introduced an improvement concerning the folding part of the cap which protects the ears.

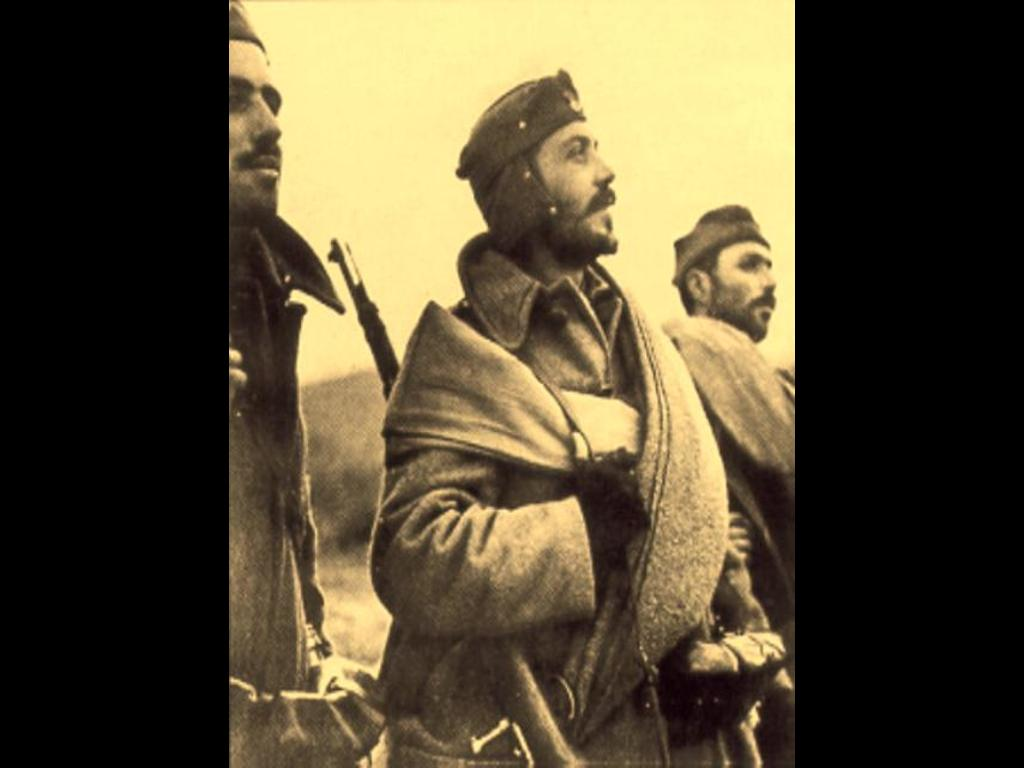
Three Greek Second World War soldiers, wearing forage caps mod.1938.

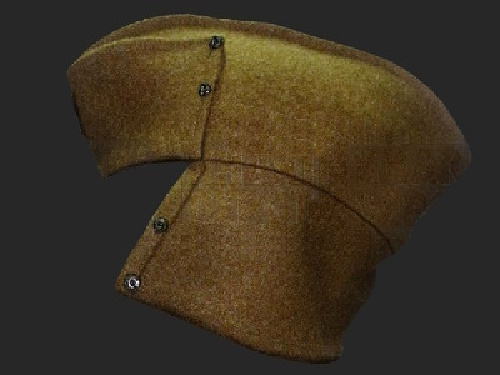
Greek Forage Cap mod.1938

=== Austro-Hungarian Army, Austrian Army, and Royal Hungarian Army ===
The Austro-Hungarian Army adopted a cap in the 19th century fitted with a peak and cloth chinstraps (or flaps). The chinstraps could be buttoned over the forehead, either securing the folded-up peak or leaving it loose, or could be buttoned under the chin, extending the rear of the cap downwards to protect the ears from the elements. This cap continues in military (Österreichisches Bundesheer), border guard (Österreichs Garde), and police use with the Republic of Austria, although the camouflaged version worn today retains only the peak, not the chinstraps, of its predecessor). After the break-up of the Austro-Hungarian Empire, the Royal Hungarian Army had also continued to issue this type of cap. Variations on this cap were adopted by other armies.

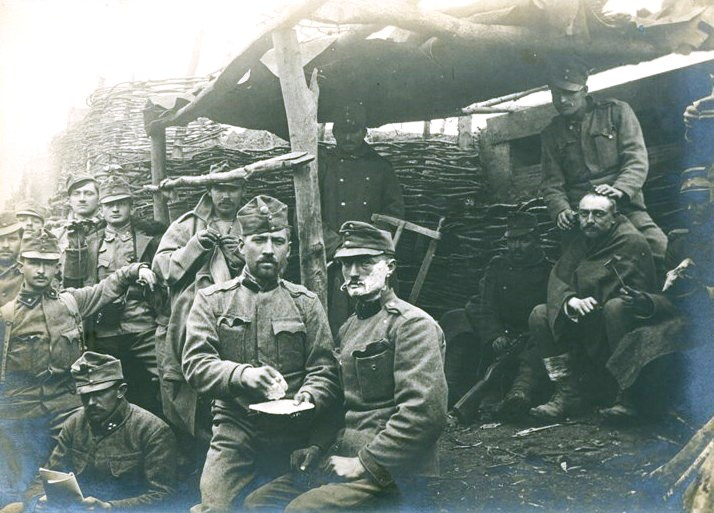
Austro-Hungarian soldiers during the First World War

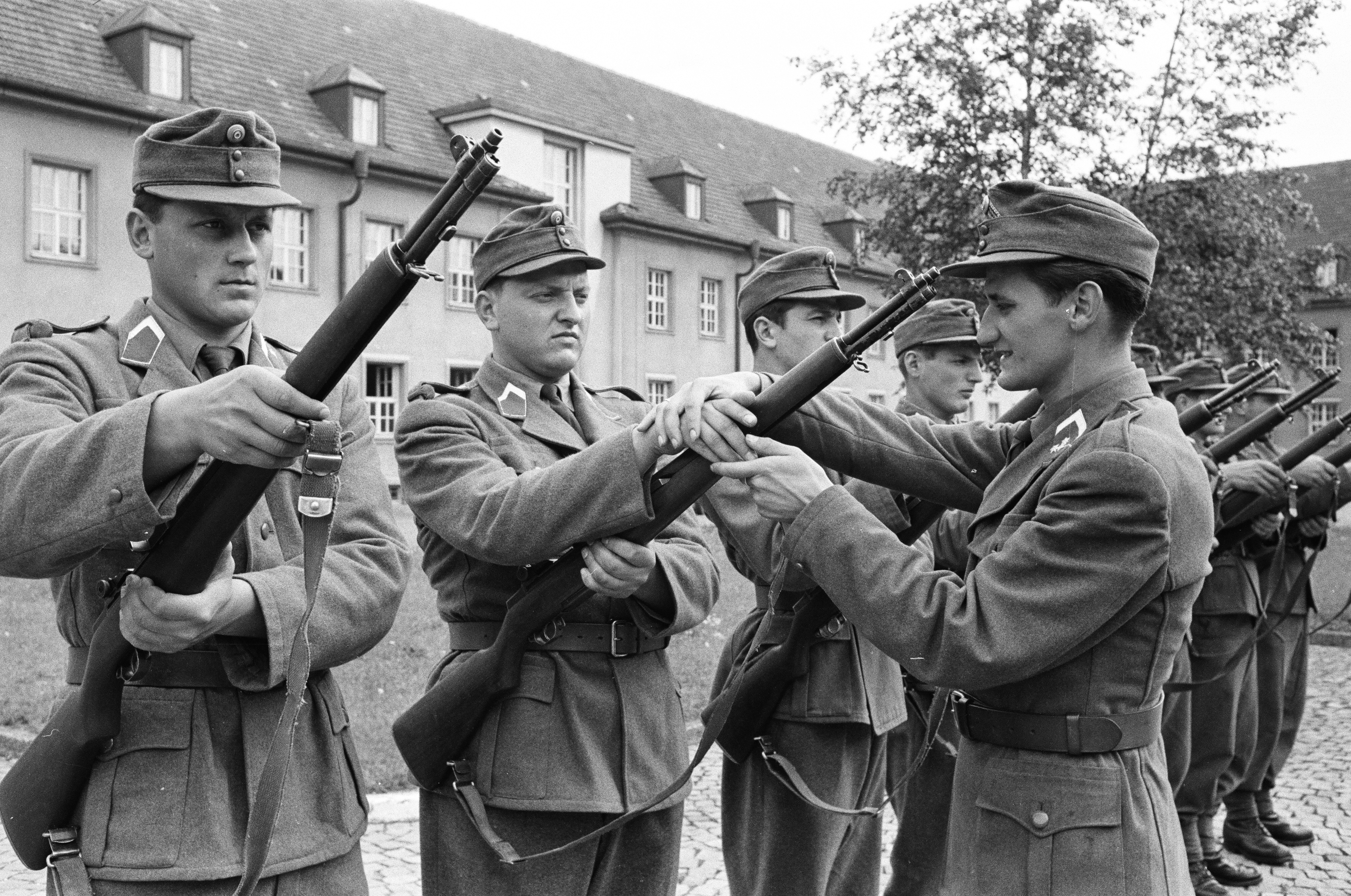
Austrian troops training with M1 Garand rifles during the 1950s

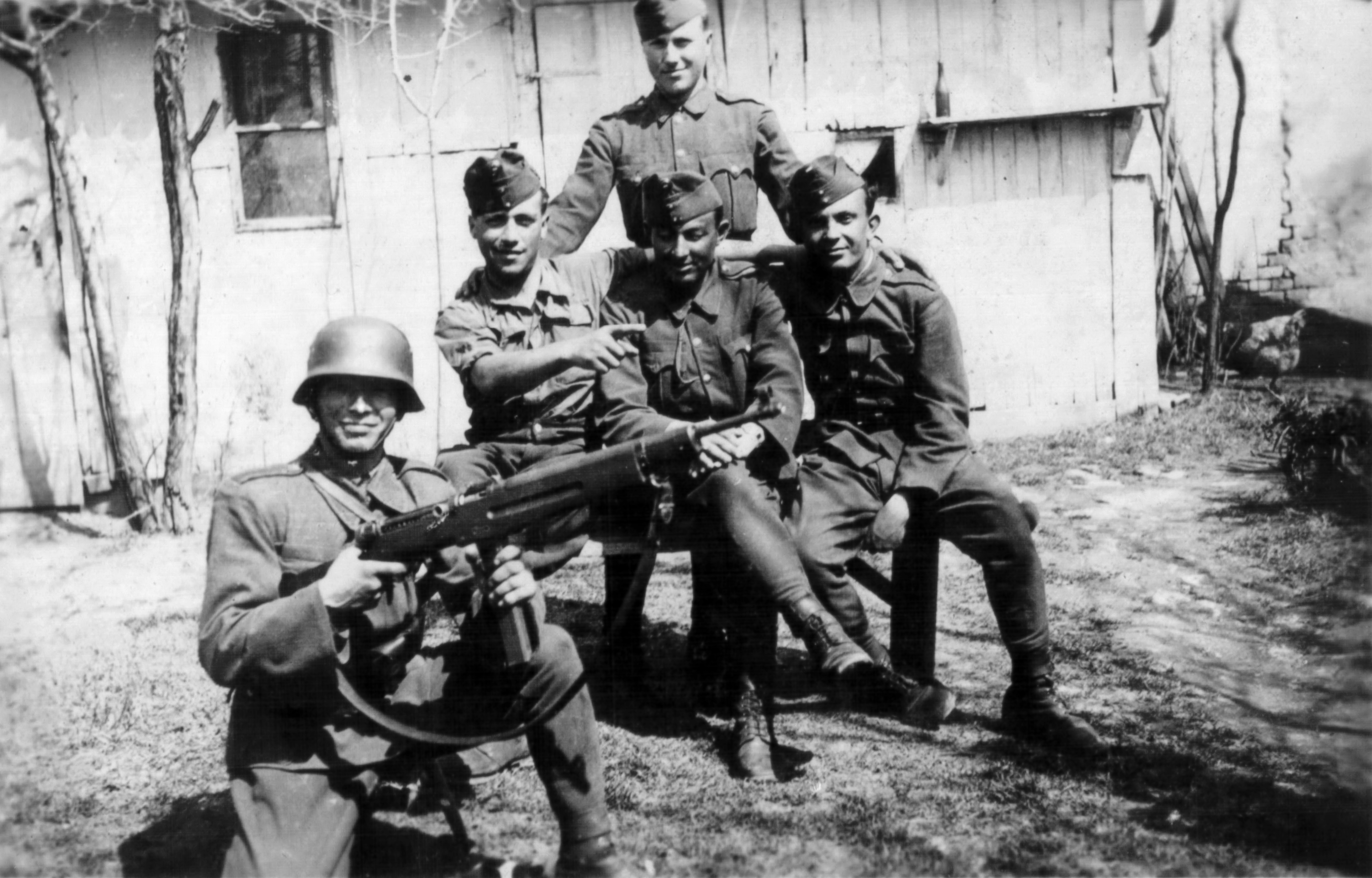
Hungarian soldiers in the Carpathians in 1944 (one wearing a helmet and the rest wearing forage caps)

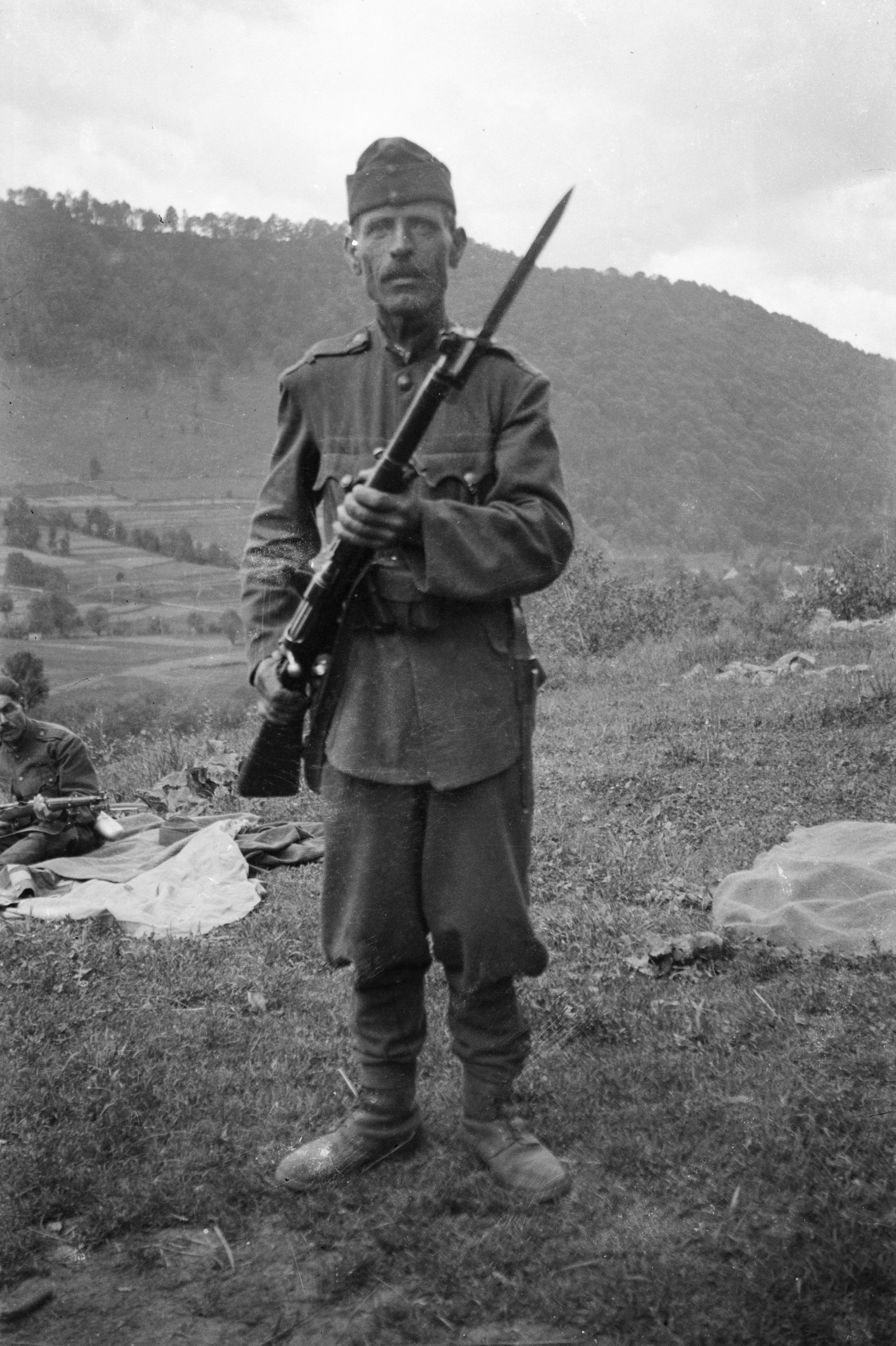
Hungarian soldier, 1940

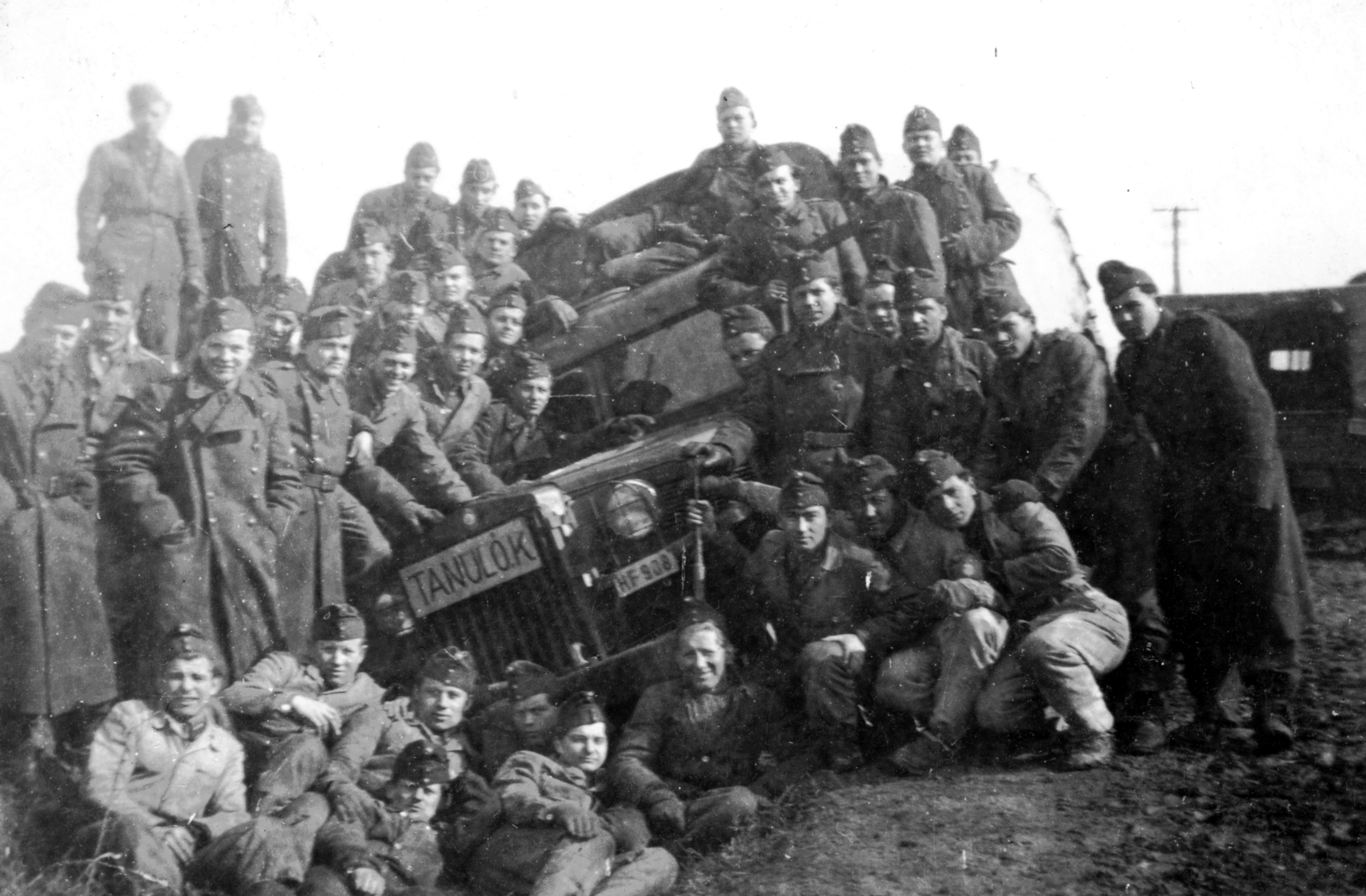
Uniform, military, commercial vehicle, Hungarian brand, tableau, Rába-brand Fortepan 22344

=== Spanish military ===
A chapiri of the Spanish Legion

The gorro de cuartel – referred to variously as gorrillo, gorra, chapiri or platano – was modelled on the later versions of the French bonnet de police and has the same vestigial tassel hanging from the front of the crown. The gorro de cuartel was originally known as the isabellina; a large beret-like headdress which also included a tassel and was worn by the supporters of Queen Isabella II during the Carlist Wars of the mid-19th century.

It was in common use by both sides during the Spanish Civil War and continued in use by the Francoist forces after the war ended. It is now the distinguishing headgear of the Spanish Legion, who wear it in barracks and on parade.

In 2024, the cap was adopted by the National Police Corps (National Police) in its cavalry unit to replace the baseball cap and which uses it only on the service uniform of this unit.

=== United Kingdom ===
==== British Army and Royal Marines ====
In the British Army, infantry forage caps were first regulated by the War Office in 1811 as a practical head dress that could be worn off duty, in barracks or in camp, in place of the cumbersome shakos and various forms of helmet comprising regimental headdress. Before this date, forage caps were worn as ordered regimentally. Mentioned in sources as early as 1768, these took on various forms, in some instances being made up locally using parts of worn out uniforms. When not in use, forage caps could either be stowed in knapsacks or strapped to the cartouche case. The caps ordered in 1811 were of knitted and felted wool, blue-grey in colour with a white band around the base. Following the end of the Napoleonic wars, forage caps were once again sourced regimentally and took the form of round bonnets in a variety of shapes, frequently made up of cloth in regimental facing colours. In 1829, these regimental forage caps were regulated by order to impose uniformity and then in 1834 replaced by a plain cap of knitted felt wool, known as a Kilmarnock Bonnet (from the place of manufacture in southwest Scotland).

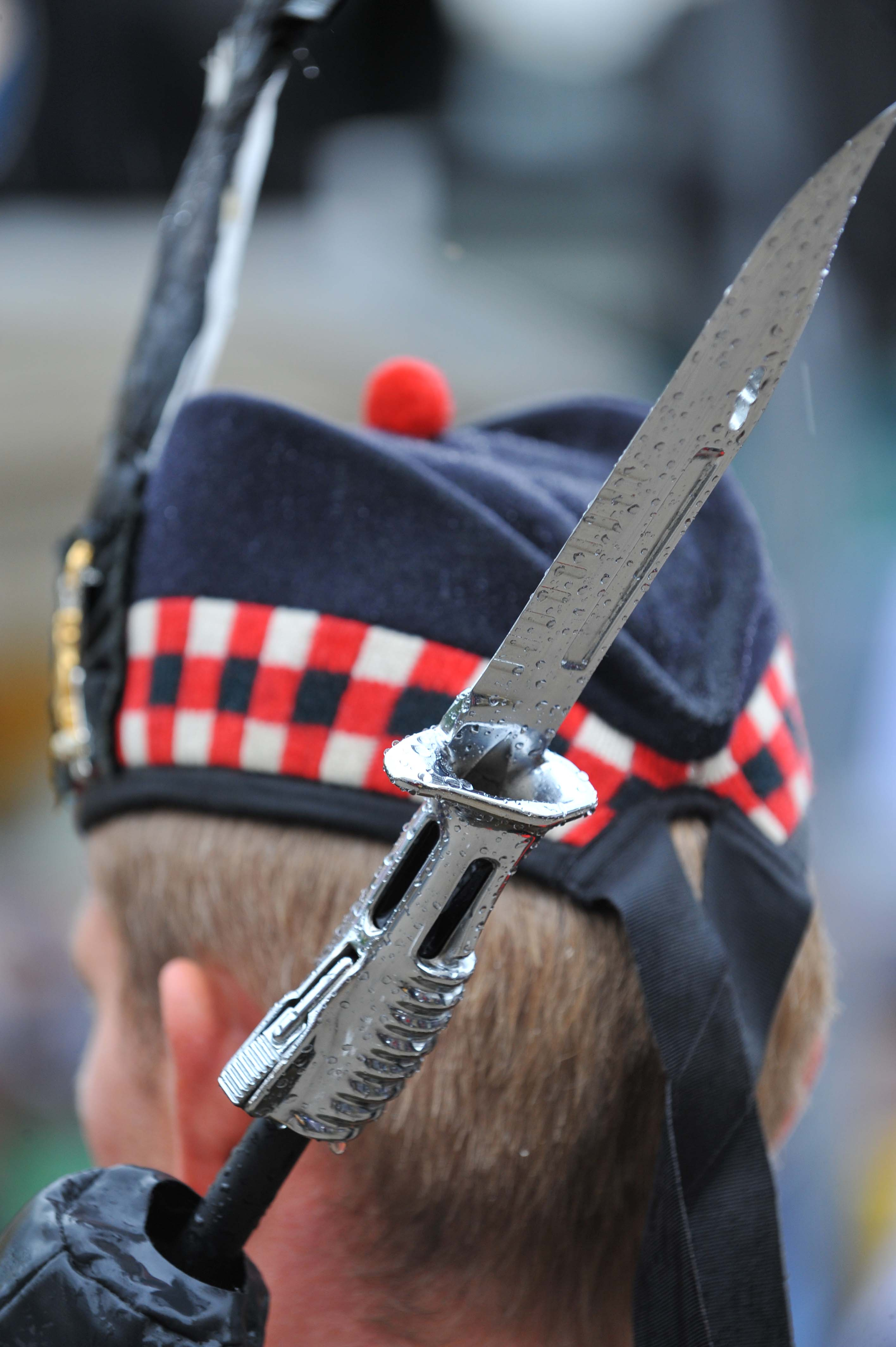
The Argyll and Sutherland Highlanders, 5th Battalion The Royal Regiment of Scotland (5 SCOTS) soldier wearing Glengarry cap on parade in Dumbarton, Scotland, 2011

The Kilmarnock forage cap was superseded in kilted Highland regiments by the Glengarry bonnet in 1851. The rest of the infantry, including the foot guards, continued to wear versions of the Kilmarnock until 1868, when the remaining regiments of foot also adopted the Glengarry. The foot guards who retained a round forage cap, together with a folding side cap, worn in working dress and in camp. In 1897, the Glengarry was replaced by the "Austrian cap" (or side cap).

The Dress Regulations for the Army of 1900 described, and provided photographs of, several different models of forage cap. These included the staff pattern with wider crown and leather peak; the model worn by the Household Cavalry with straight sides and peak; and that worn by cavalry regiments – a small round cap without a peak, braided and coloured according to regimental pattern, worn at an angle on the head and held in place by a leather chin strap.

In 1902 a new style of forage cap, named after the then Secretary of State for War, St John Brodrick, replaced the Austrian cap. The 'Brodrick cap' took the form of a stiffened and round shaped forage cap with no peak that was not dissimilar in appearance to a sailor's hat, although it was dark blue in colour and had a patch of facing colour cloth behind the regimental badge, which was worn centrally at the front.

In 1905 the Brodrick was replaced by a broad-topped cap with wired brim and leather peak, based on the pattern worn in the Royal Navy, which was introduced as a "forage cap" for off-duty 'walking out' and other semi-formal occasions. Under the same name, a slightly modified version of this cap is currently worn by most modern British regiments with No. 1 ceremonial and No. 2 khaki parade dress. The body of this headdress is generally dark blue (hussar and lancer regiments wear scarlet forage caps while The Rifles wear dark green), the cap bands are red for "royal" regiments and corps, or in regimental colours.

The Parachute Regiment do not wear forage caps, favoring instead maroon berets.

The Royal Marines continued to wear the Brodrick into the 1930s with parade and walking out dress. Before the First World War, a khaki cover with integral peak was issued to wear over it in the field with khaki service dress, but the army's khaki service dress cap replaced this during the war.

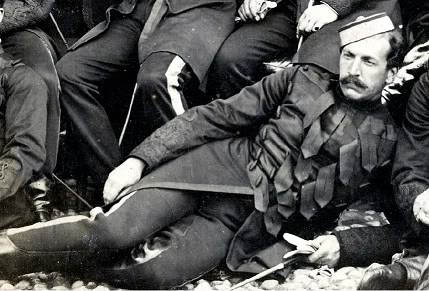
Captain Alfred Hutton, wearing a cavalry model forage cap

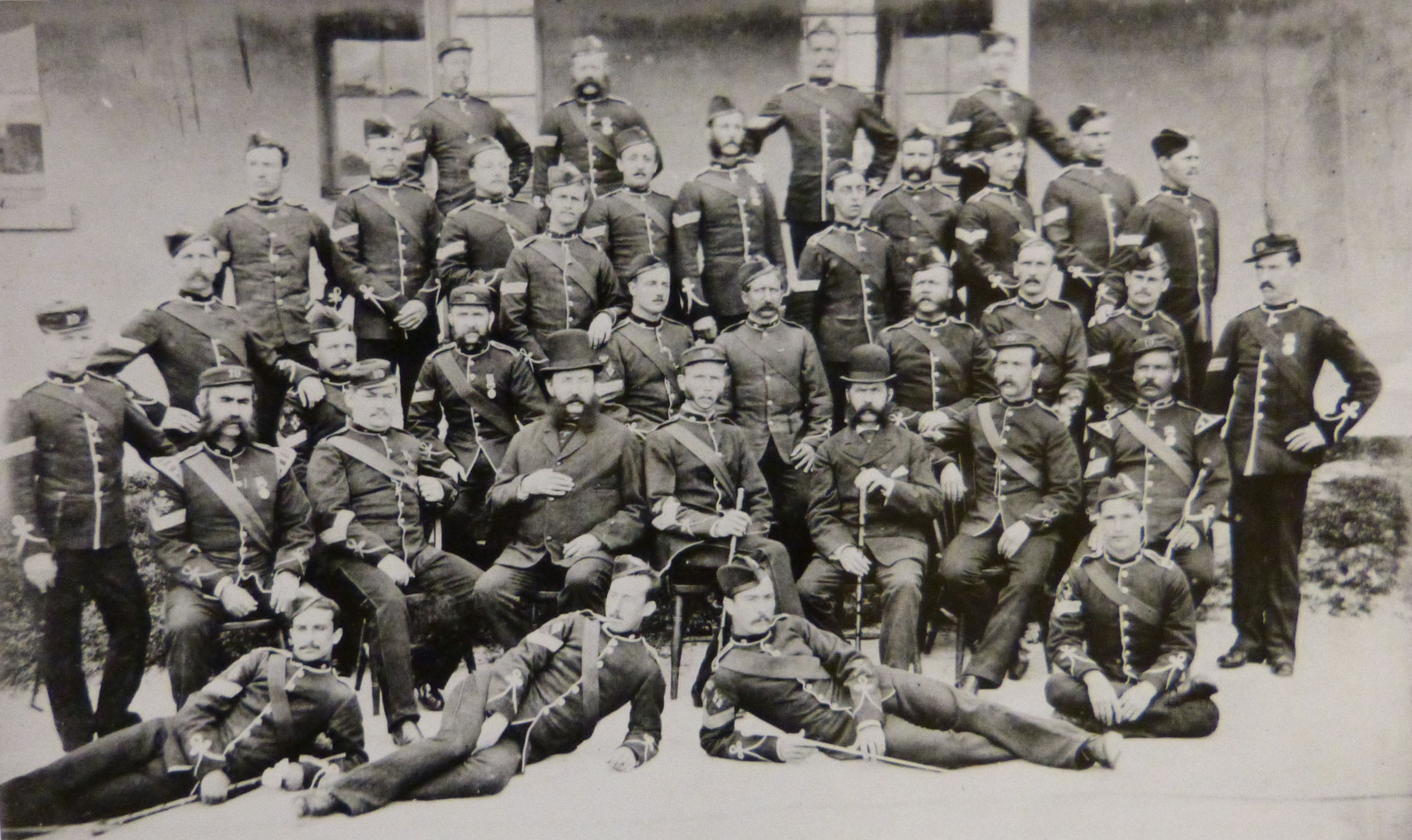
1st Battalion, 19th (1st Yorkshire North Riding – Princess of Wales's Own) Regiment of Foot warrant officers and NCOs in Bermuda circa 1879–1880, wearing round forage caps and Glengarry caps

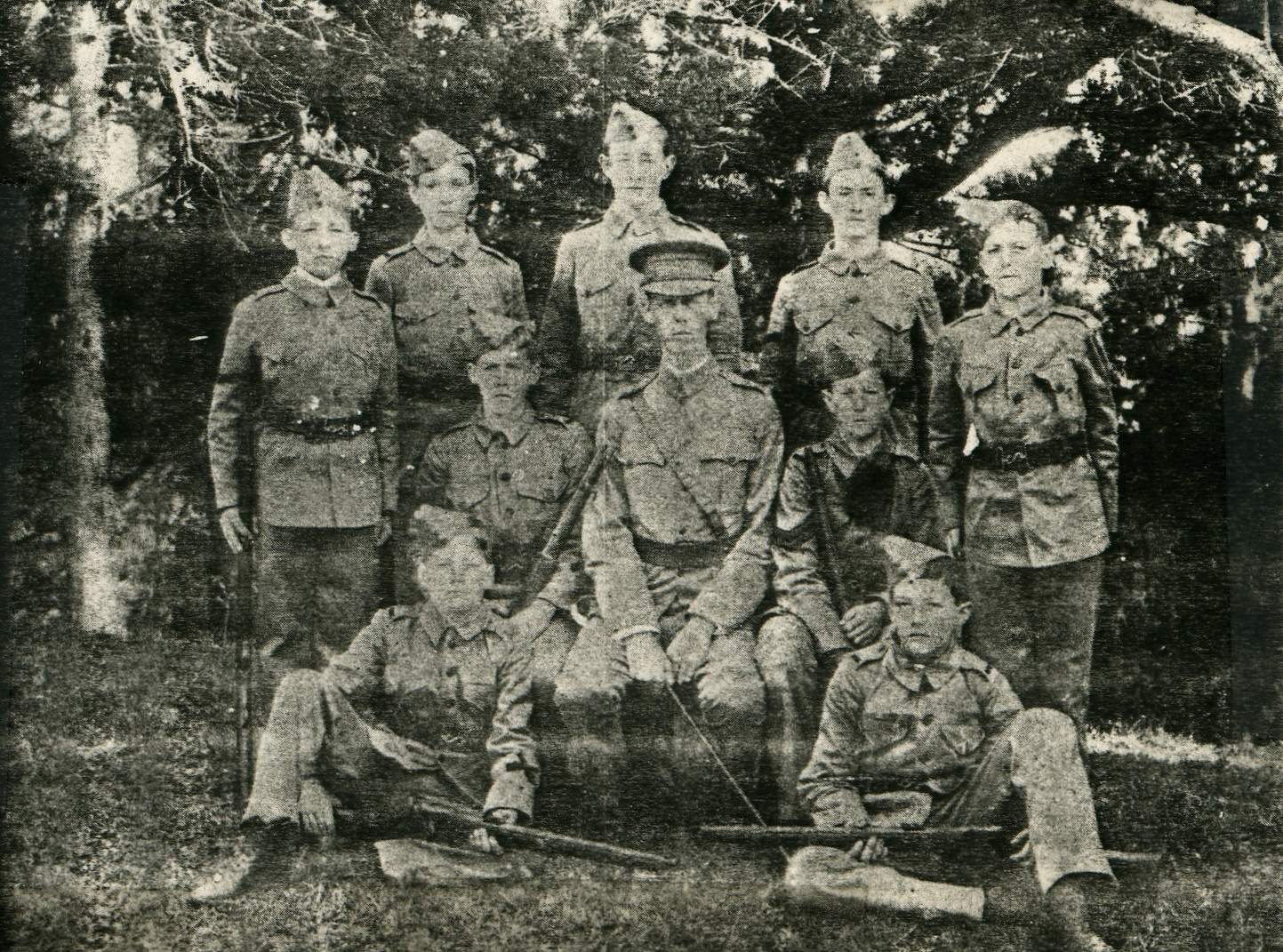
Saltus Grammar School Cadet Corps (later Bermuda Cadet Corps), wearing Austrian side caps, ca. 1901

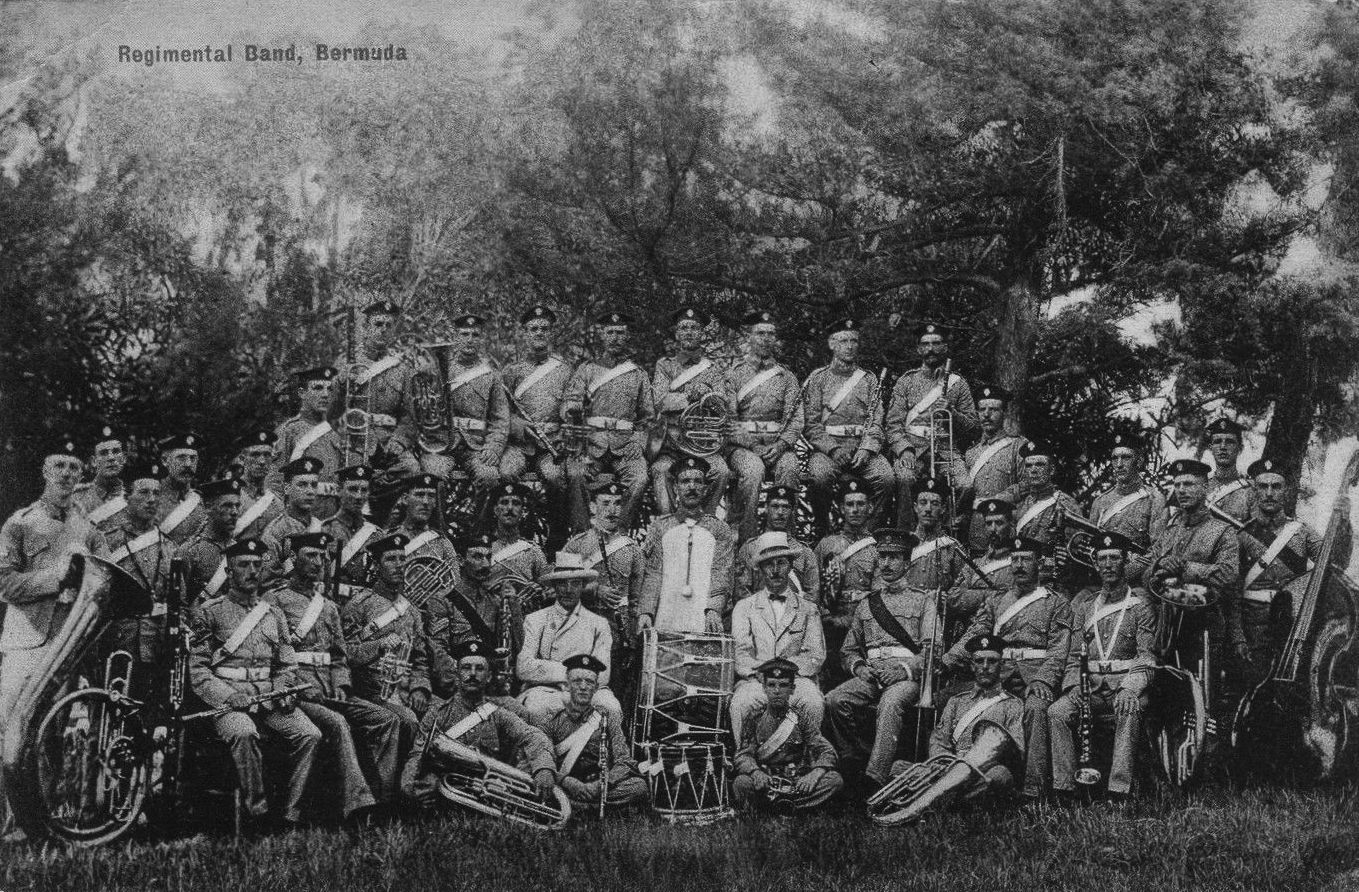
Band of the 3rd Battalion The Royal Fusiliers wear Brodrick caps in Bermuda, circa 1903

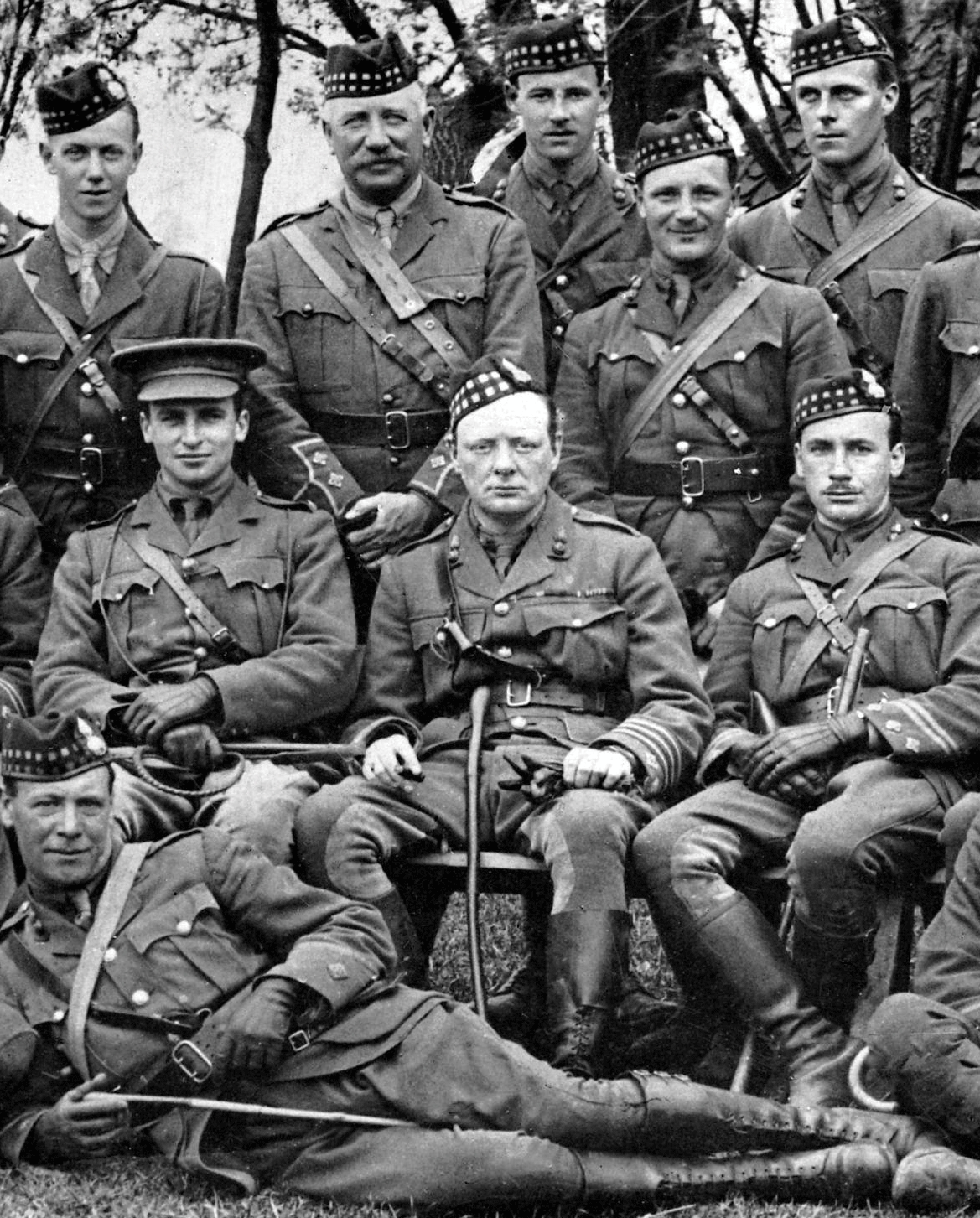
6th Battalion, Royal Scots Fusiliers officers in Glengarry side caps at Ploegsteert with Sir Winston Churchill in 1916

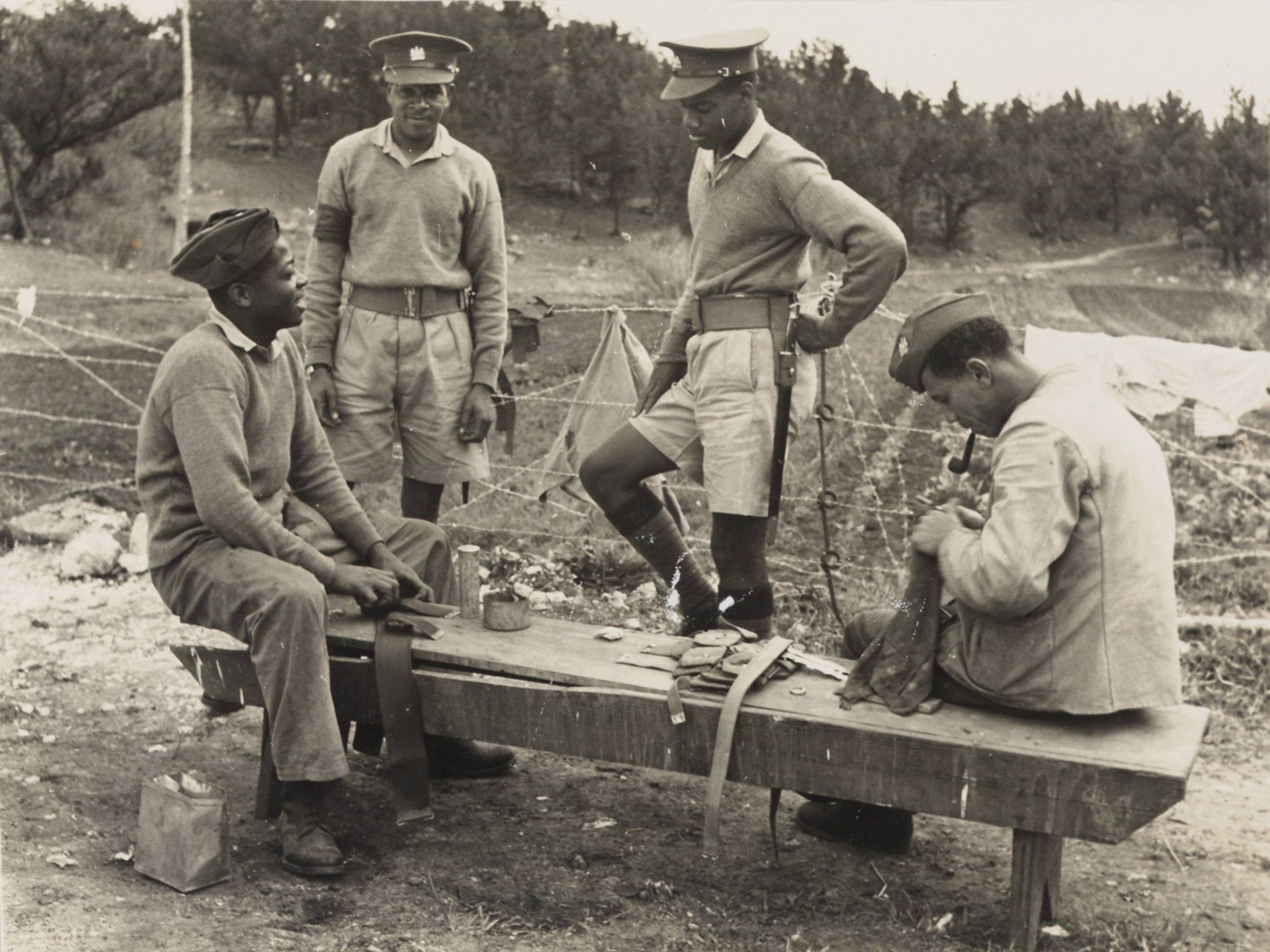
Two (standing) Bermuda Militia Infantry soldiers wearing the 1905 style khaki peaked cap, and two (seated) wearing the new khaki side cap, circa 1940

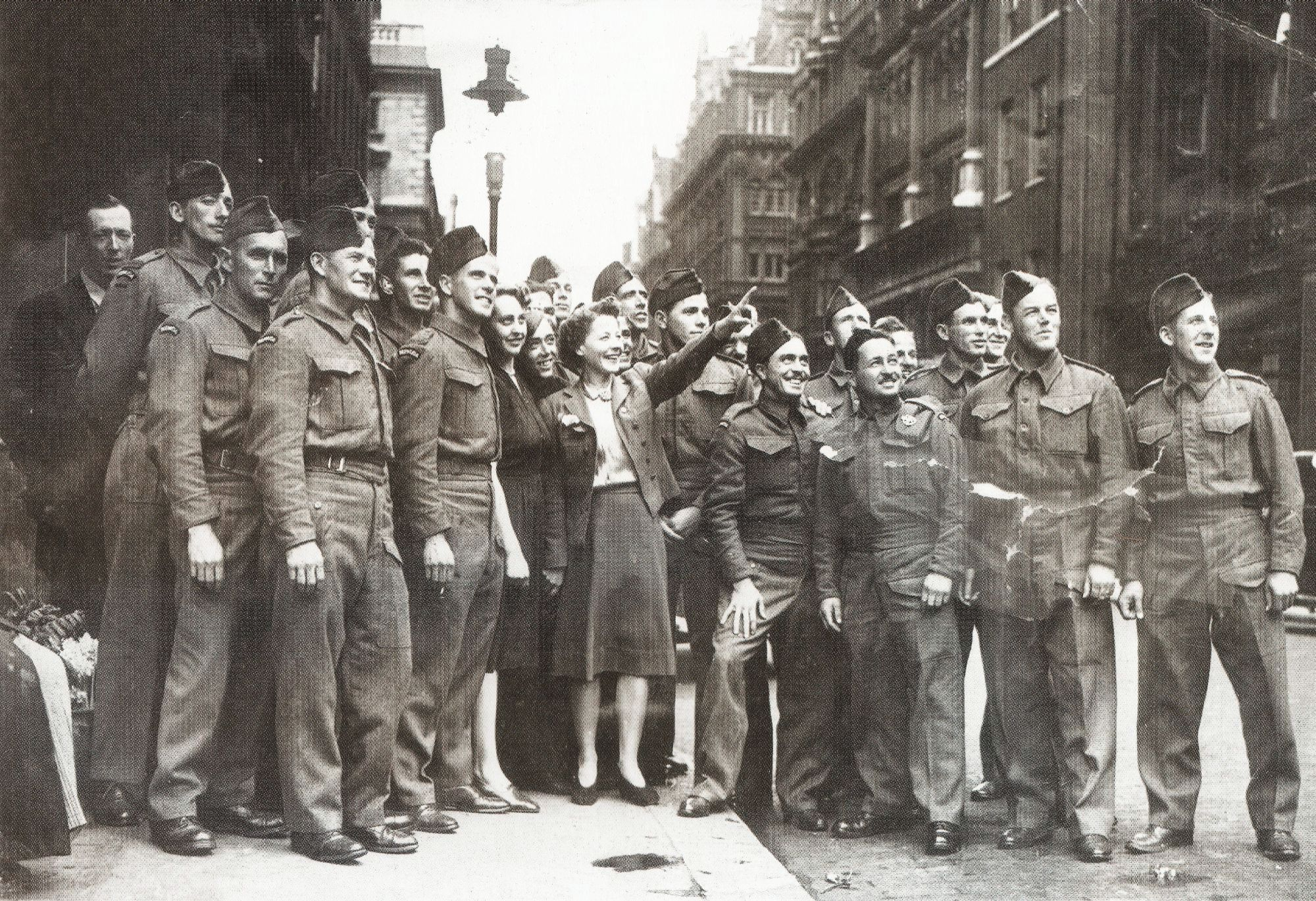
Bermuda Volunteer Rifle Corps soldiers serving with the Lincolnshire Regiment wear side caps, circa 1944

==== Royal Air Force ====
The Royal Air Force (RAF) field service cap is often called a forage cap (and is also colloquially known as the chip bag or Thunderbird hat). It has no peak, and because of its longitudinal cut is called a 'fore-and-after'. Its two ornamental buttons at the front can be unfastened in order to let down earflaps for harsh weather. (The German Army forage cap of the Second World War was similar, but of two distinct types, one with an eye-shading peak or bill, the other without.) Available to be worn by all ranks (officers and other ranks) when working dress is ordered, the field service caps worn by group captains and above have additional light blue ('Minerva blue') piping.

The field service cap was worn by RAF personnel for everyday purposes from 1936, completely superseding the previously worn peaked cap in December 1939, until about 1950, when it was superseded by the RAF blue beret (introduced after the Second World War) for officers of the RAF Regiment and all other ranks, and the SD cap for other officers. RAF field service caps can still be bought privately and worn on duty by all ranks as working dress. They are commonly worn with flying suits, as they are easier to stow in a side pocket or cockpit than SD caps, but only air vice-marshals and above are authorised to wear them with combat uniform. The fore-and-after is still worn by airmen in other services, such as the US Air Force and the Royal Canadian Air Force.

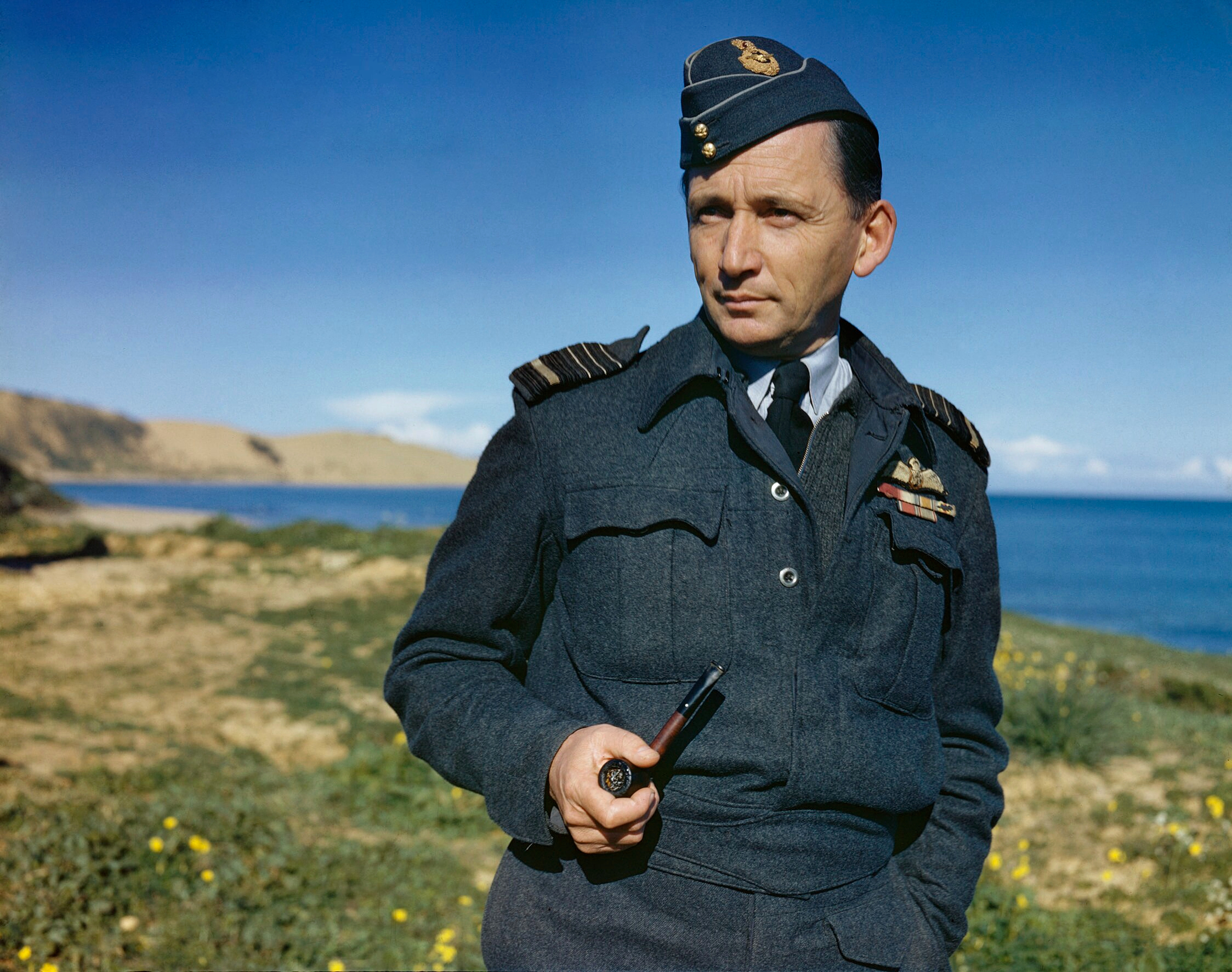
Air Chief Marshal Sir Arthur Tedder wearing war service dress

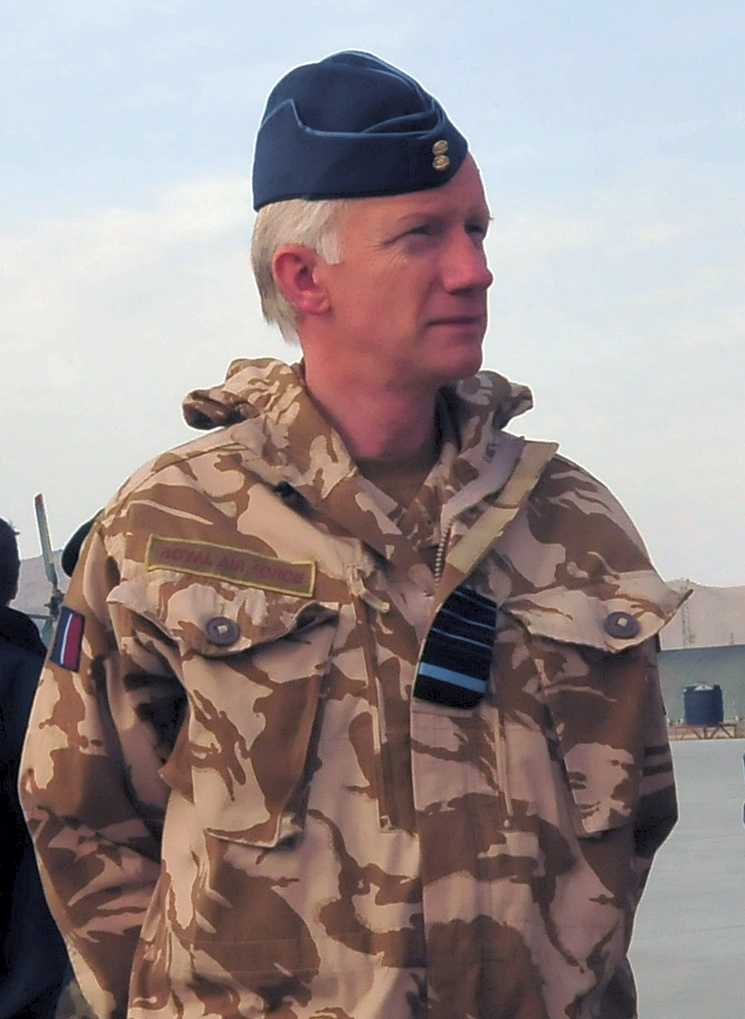
Air Chief Marshal Sir Stephen Dalton wearing a forage cap with desert DPM in 2010

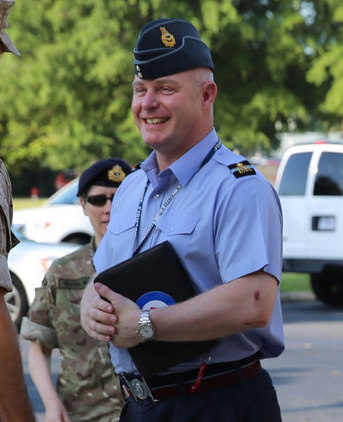
Air Commodore Harvey Smyth wearing a forage cap with 2b service working dress. Visible on this example is an RAF cap badge

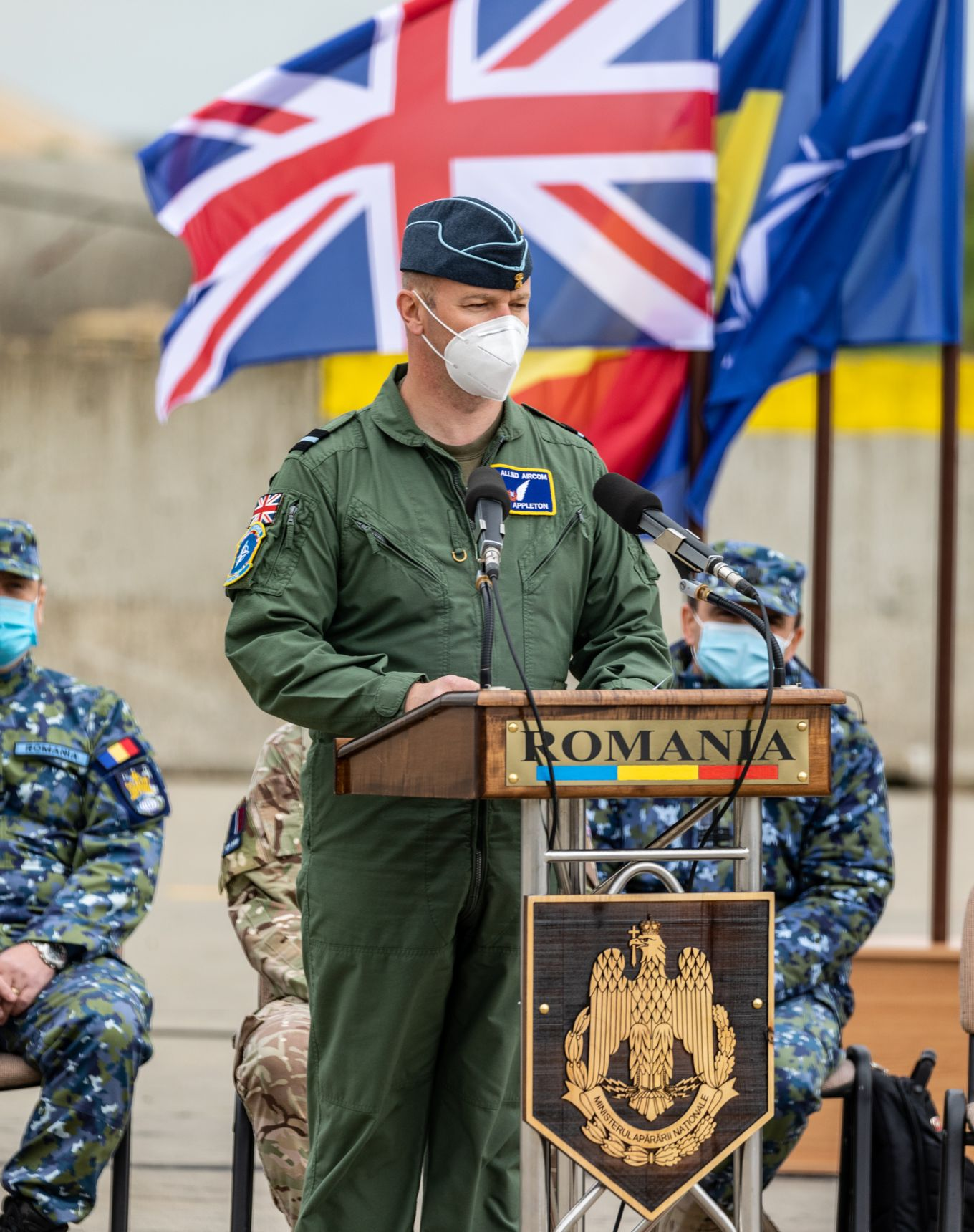
RAF Air Commodore wearing a forage cap with a flight suit in 2021

=== United States military ===
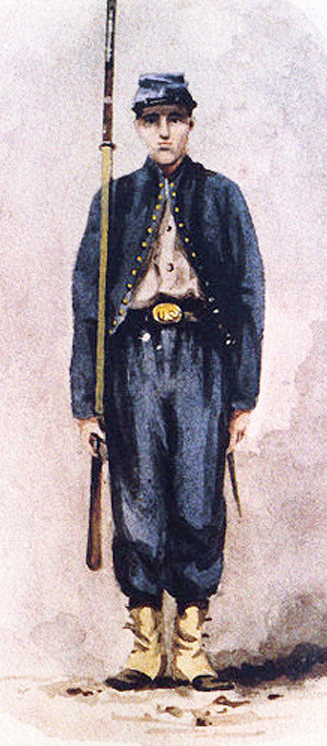
Painting of a Union soldier (in zouave uniform) wearing the 1858 pattern kepi during the American Civil War

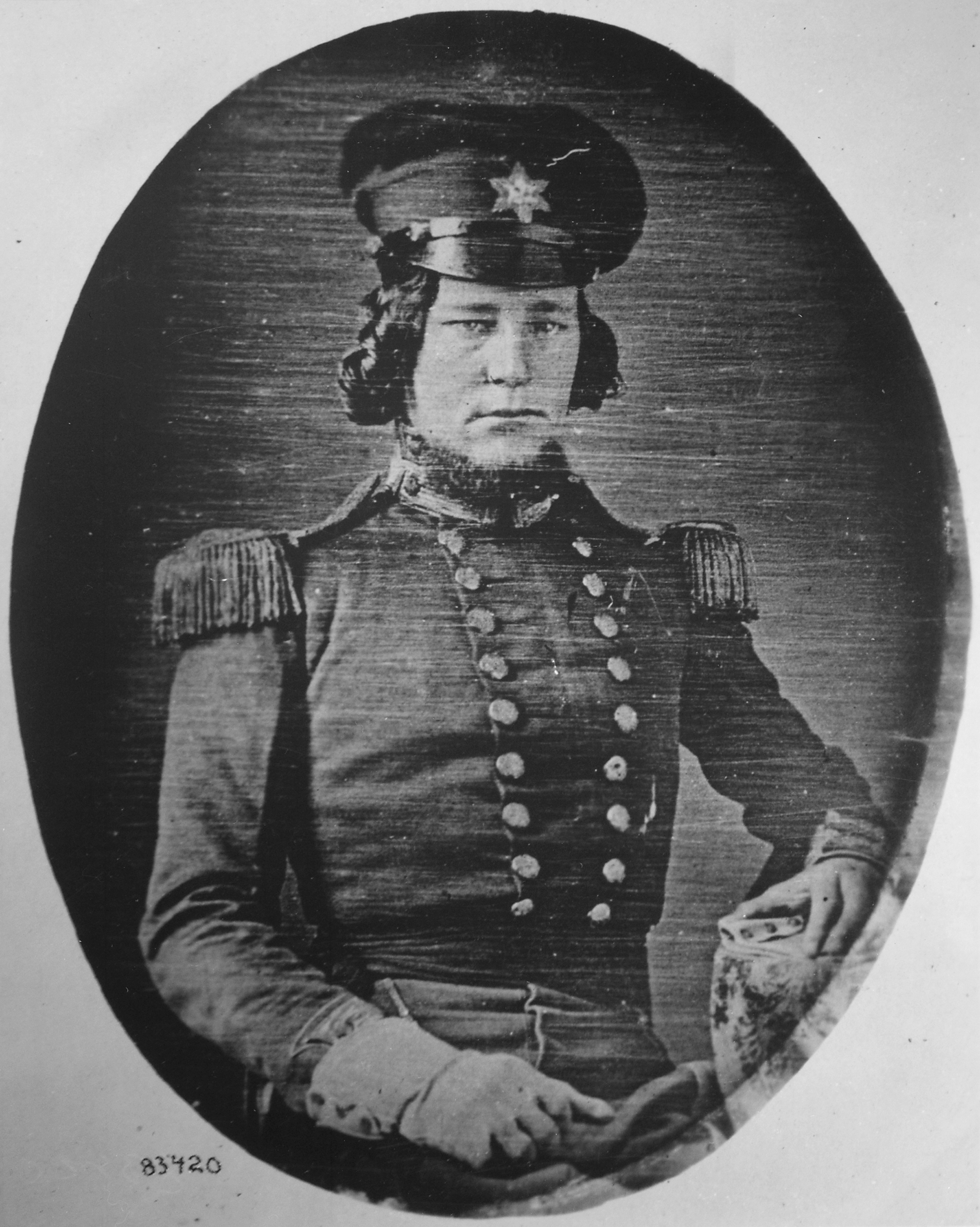
1839 pattern forage cap from the Mexican War era

The M1825 forage cap (also known as the pinwheel cap) was worn by the United States military from 1825 to 1833 when it began to be replaced by the M1833 forage cap. It was used in conflicts such as the Black Hawk War of 1832, the 2nd Seminole war of 1835–1842, and the Winnebago War of 1827 by American forces. The cap was also adopted by the Texan Army and worn by American volunteers in the Texas Revolution from 1835 to 1836. The M1839 cap of the Mexican War was of a somewhat similar pattern to the 1833 cap with it becoming a visor cap made in navy blue wool. It also added universal neck-flaps, whereas the 1833 only had neckflaps on the dragoon variant. In the Civil War the M1858 forage cap, based on the French kepi, was the most common headgear worn by Union troops even though it was described by one soldier as "shapeless as a feedbag". There were two types of brims: the first, called the McClellan cap was flat; the second, called the McDowell cap, was curved. U.S. Army regulations called for insignia to be put on the top of the cap, with branch of service (infantry, cavalry or artillery) in the middle, company letter above and the regimental number below. In 1863 the corps badge was introduced in the Army of the Potomac in an attempt to boost morale among the troops; this badge was also added to the cap. If the soldier was in the infantry the bugle horn was put below the disk, with the regimental number inside the infantry horn, the company letter above the horn and the corp badge above that. More frequently than not the soldier lacked this degree of insignia. Occasionally, the branch of service, company letter or regimental number insignia was also used. After the Civil War, the forage cap fell into disuse; it was rarely worn, but was in use until the 1870s.

== See also ==
- List of hat styles
- Campaign hat
- Kepi
- Side cap
- Headgear of the United States Army
