= Francesco Domenico Chiarello =

- Born: 5 November 1898; Umbriatico, Italy
- Died: 27 June 2008 (aged 109); Cirò Marina, Italy
- Military career
- Allegiance: Kingdom of Italy
- Branch: Royal Italian Army
- Service years: 1918–1920, 1940
- Conflicts: World War I World War II
- Other work: Farmer

Francesco Domenico Chiarello (5 November 1898 – 27 June 2008), Knight of Vittorio Veneto, was, together with Fernand Goux of France and seaman Claude Choules of England and later Australia, one of the last three soldiers to see action in both World Wars. Chiarello was also one of the last two surviving Italian and Alpine Front veterans of the First World War, along with fellow 110-year-old Delfino Borroni.

Called up in 1918, he enlisted in the Castrovillari. He spent three months in training and then served as an infantryman at Cosenza. First sent to the front line in Trentino, he was later sent by sea from the port of Taranto to Albania. There he contracted malaria, but recovered in a field hospital. Afterwards he was sent to Montenegro where he served for two more years in the Italian army.

He later married and ran his farm in Umbriatico, but in 1940 he was called up again to fight in the Second World War at Reggio Calabria, to be discharged after six months. He lived in Cirò Marina until his death in June 2008.

== Bibliography ==
- Biography of Chiarello
- Francesco Domenico Chiarello's obituary
