= Delfino Borroni =

Italian supercentenarian and soldier (1898–2008)

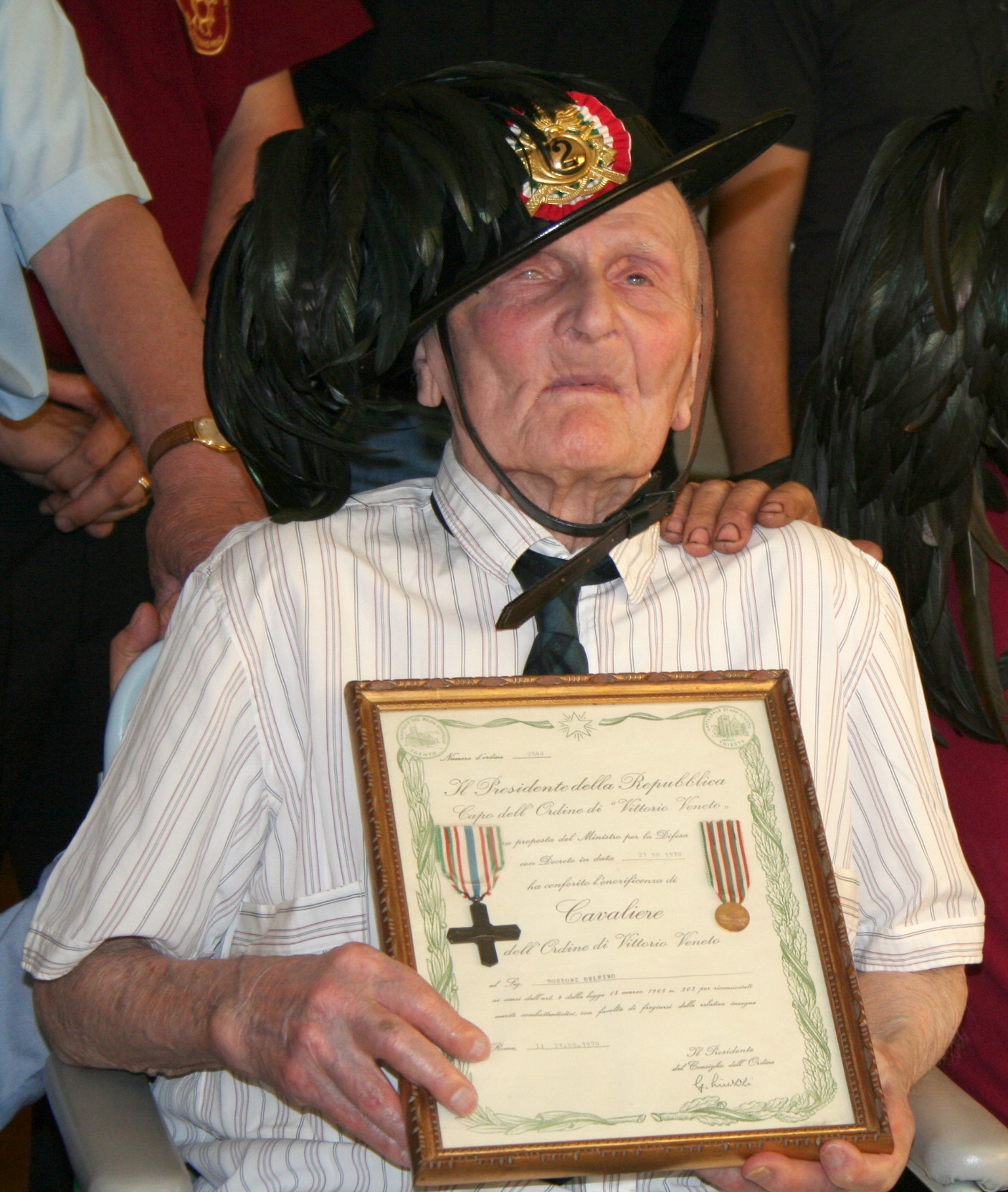
- Born: 23 August 1898; Turago Bordone, Pavia, Italy
- Died: 26 October 2008 (aged 110 years, 64 days); Castano Primo, Milan, Italy
- Military career
- Allegiance: Italy
- Branch: Italian Army
- Service years: January 1917 – May 1920
- Unit: 6th Bersaglieri Regiment
- Conflicts: World War I
- Other work: Tram driver

Delfino Edmondo Borroni, Knight of Vittorio Veneto (23 August 1898 – 26 October 2008) was, at the age of 110, Italy's oldest man, and the eleventh-oldest verified man in the world.

Borroni was the last veteran of the Alpine Front in the First World War, following the June 2008 death of the penultimate Italian Francesco Domenico Chiarello. The last Austro-Hungarian veteran, Franz Künstler, died in May 2008. At the time of his death, there were two other trench veterans who survived: Britons Harry Patch and Frenchman Fernand Goux, who fought on the Western Front.

== Biography ==
Borroni, a mechanic, was born in Giussago, in the province of Pavia; he was called up in January 1917 and assigned to the 6th Bersaglieri Regiment in March. He first saw action in the Pasubio Alpine massif, where he fought against the Austro-Hungarian forces. He also fought in Valsugana and at Caporetto, where, after being shot in the heel while on a dangerous reconnaissance mission, he was captured as an Austrian prisoner of war and was forced to dig trenches until he managed to escape in the last days of the war.

He was seriously wounded as a civilian, a tram driver, in an Allied air raid during World War II.

Borroni died on 26 October 2008, at the age of 110 years and 64 days. His death was noted in the news. The Italian Government's Defence Minister Ignazio La Russa attended the funeral.

== See also ==
- Last surviving World War I veteran by country
