= Saint-Georges-d'Aurac =

- Commune
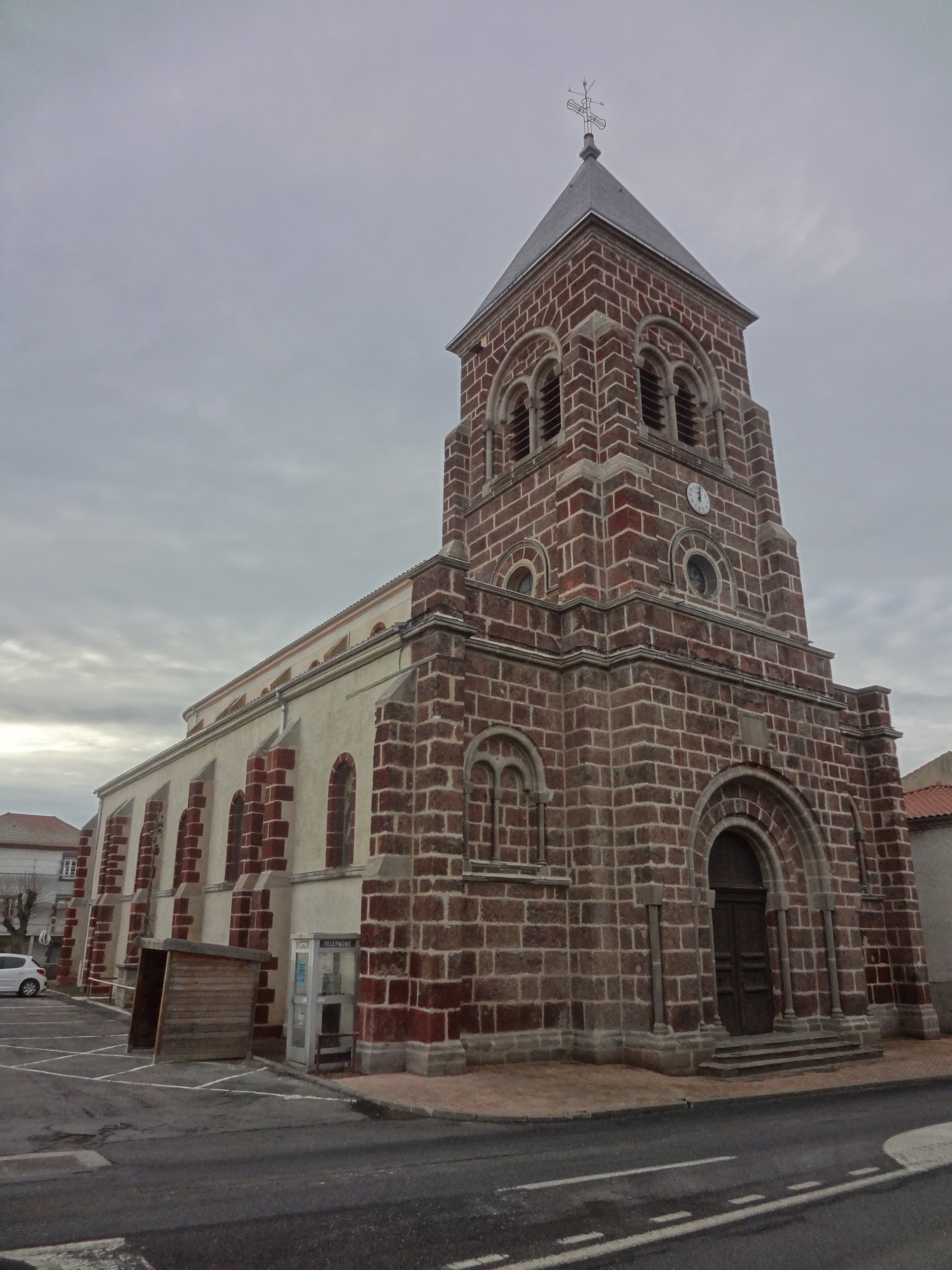
- Location of Saint-Georges-d'Aurac
- Location within France Location within Auvergne-Rhône-Alpes
- Coordinates: 45°09′26″N 3°32′30″E
- Country: France
- Region: Auvergne-Rhône-Alpes
- Department: Haute-Loire
- Arrondissement: Brioude
- Canton: Pays de Lafayette

Government
  - Mayor (2020–2026): Alain Garnier
- Area^{1}: 17.42 km^{2} (6.73 sq mi)
- Elevation: 633 m (2,077 ft)
- Highest elevation: 911 m (2,989 ft)
- Lowest elevation: 557 m (1,827 ft)
- Population (2023): 469
  - Density: 26.9/km^{2} (69.7/sq mi)
- Time zone: UTC+01:00 (CET)
  - Summer (DST): UTC+02:00 (CEST)
- INSEE/Postal code: 43188 /43230
- ^{1} French Land Register data, which excludes lakes, ponds, glaciers > 1 km^{2} (0.386 sq mi or 247 acres) and river estuaries.

Saint-Georges-d'Aurac (French pronunciation: [sɛ̃ ʒɔʁʒ doʁak]; Occitan: Sent Jòrgi d'Aurac) is a commune in the Haute-Loire department in south-central France.

== Population ==
Historical population
Year	Pop.	±% p.a.
1968	556	—
1975	478	−2.14%
1982	453	−0.76%
1990	427	−0.74%
1999	411	−0.42%
2007	418	+0.21%
2012	458	+1.84%
2017	466	+0.35%
2023	469	+0.11%
Source: INSEE

== Personalities ==
The commune was the home of Louis de Cazenave who was, at the time of his death, the oldest surviving French veteran of World War I in France.

== See also ==
- Communes of the Haute-Loire department
