= Pietro Micheletti =

Italian military commander (1900–2005)

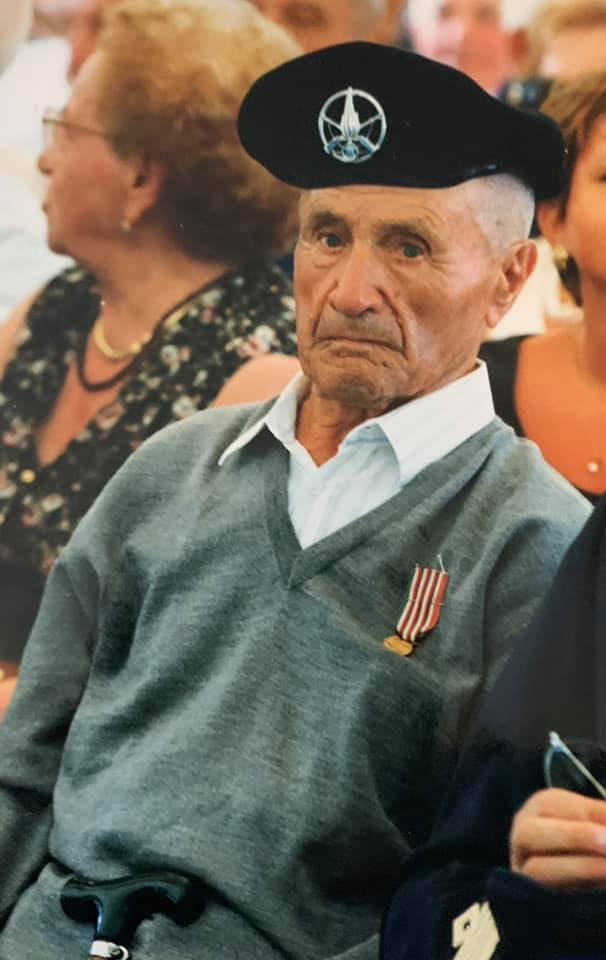
- Born: 19 October 1900; Maciano di Pennabilli, Italy
- Died: 25 March 2005 (aged 104); Maciano di Pennabilli, Italy
- Military career
- Allegiance: Italy
- Branch: Italian Army
- Service years: 1917–1925
- Rank: Major
- Conflicts: World War I Fiume's War
- Awards: Military Cross; World War I Victory Medal; Ordine di Vittorio Veneto; Knight of the Order of Merit of the Italian Republic
- Other work: farmer manager

Pietro Micheletti (19 October 1900 – 25 March 2005) was an Italian military commander.

He was born in Pennabilli, the second of three brothers, into a family in Marche who had moved to Pennabilli in 1500 from Trapani, Sicily,

In 1917, during World War I, he volunteered for the frontline, and was sent into battle on 15 June 1918 in the elite troop of 'Arditi' at the Battle of the Piave River. Awarded medals for bravery for the deeds he performed during some fierce battles towards the end of the war, he followed his battalion commander at the War Office, where he held executive positions at the Department of Defence. In December 1919, he was a member of the military commission which negotiated the surrender of the breakaway city of Fiume by Gabriele D'Annunzio.

In 1958 the Italian President appointed him Knight of the Order of Vittorio Veneto; in October 2000 the Council of the Marche Region, to celebrate its one hundred years anniversary, awarded him the Cross of the Council of the Marche Region.

On 29 November 2003 the City of Pennabilli, because of services rendered to the nation during the First World War, presented him with the keys of the City, an honour previously awarded only to the Dalai Lama. In April 2004 the Governor of the Province of Pesaro and Urbino, listed him among those who paid tribute to the land of Pesaro and Urbino and presented him with a province of Apifarfalle.

On 2 June 2005 President Carlo Azeglio Ciampi: "noted the heroic deeds performed by Pietro Micheletti during the First World War and his meritorious work in the interest of the Nation" and welcomed the request made by the prime minister, Silvio Berlusconi, to appoint him a Knight of the Order of Merit of the Italian Republic.

He died on 25 March 2005 at the age of 104.

In 2019, a street in Pennabili was named after Micheletti.

== See also ==
- "La Leggenda del Piave", a patriotic song written by E. A. Mario after the battle.
- Battle of the Piave river
- Gabriele D'Annunzio
- Italian Regency of Carnaro
