= Louis de Cazenave =

French pacifist (1897–2008)

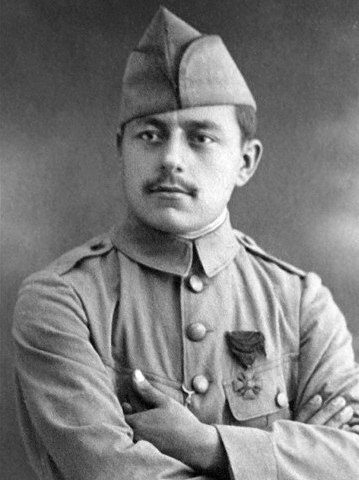
- De Cazenave in 1918
- Born: October 16, 1897; Saint-Georges-d'Aurac, France
- Died: January 20, 2008 (aged 110 years, 96 days); Brioude, France
- Relatives: married, three children
- Military career
- Allegiance: France
- Branch: French Army
- Service years: 1916–1918
- Unit: 5th Senegalese Tirailleur Battalion
- Conflicts: Chemin des Dames
- Awards: Chevalier de la Légion d'honneur Croix de guerre 1914–1918; Médaille Interalliée 1914–1918
- Other work: railway man

Louis de Cazenave (October 16, 1897 – January 20, 2008) was, at the time of his death, the oldest surviving French veteran of World War I.

De Cazenave became the oldest living poilu following the death of 111-year-old Maurice Floquet on November 10, 2006, and later following the death of 110-year-old Aimé Avignon on August 23, 2007, also the oldest living Frenchman as well as the fourth-oldest living European man. After the death of Japaneseman Giichi Okumura on October 13, 2007, he was also the 12th-oldest living man in the world.

After his death, de Cazenave was succeeded as the oldest living Frenchman as well as French veteran of World War I by Italian-born Lazare Ponticelli, who was two months younger and died only two months later, on March 12, 2008. Two further French veterans, 108-year-old Fernand Goux and 109-year-old Pierre Picault who were the oldest living Frenchmen after Ponticelli's death as well as the last living Frenchmen born before 1900, died later in November 2008, but neither was officially recognized as the last French veteran of the war by the government of France because they served fewer than three months.

== Biography ==
Louis de Cazenave was born and raised in Saint-Georges-d'Aurac in the Auvergne region of south central France. When he turned nineteen years old, at the end of 1916, he was mobilized into the military. He found himself in various units before being assigned to the colonial infantry front in the 5th Senegalese Tirailleur Battalion and fought in the Battle of Chemin des Dames.

At the end of the war, de Cazenave returned to Haute-Loire and married in 1920 to Marie, a postmistress with whom he had three sons. He became a railwayman, joining the predecessor to the SNCF. His experiences led him to become a convinced pacifist; later on, he participated in the strikes and demonstrations of the Popular Front in 1936 before going into retirement in 1941. During the Nazi occupation of France, he subscribed to the banned left-wing libertarian journal La Patrie Humaine and was imprisoned by the pro-Nazi Vichy regime.

Although at first refusing any decorations, de Cazenave accepted the Légion d’honneur in 1995, along with several other veterans. He died at his family home in Brioude at age 110.

== See also ==
- List of last surviving World War I veterans by country
- Second Battle of the Aisne
- Oldest people
- Supercentenarian
