= Pinard (wine) =

French term for wine

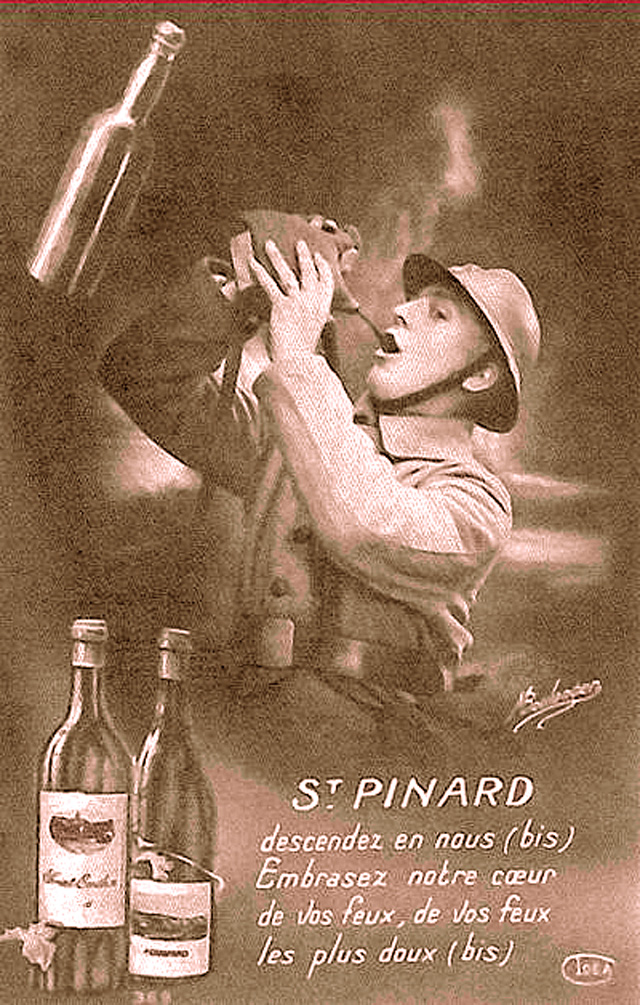
"Prayer to Saint Pinard"

Pinard is a French term for wine (particularly red wine), popularised as the label for the ration of wine issued to French troops during the First World War. The term became wrapped up in the public conception of the poilu ("hairy one", the typical French foot soldier) and his beloved pinard, joined in a "cult of wine".

== Etymology ==
Although the definite answer is unclear, a contemporary work defined the term's origin thus:

Thus, for instance, pinard, wine, was all but unknown in Paris before the war, yet it is now perhaps the most famous word in the whole soldier vocabulary. Pas de pinard, pas de poilu. The origin of the word is not far to seek. The second syllable is an orthodox ending, and pinaud is the name of a well-known small Burgundy grape.
