= Lazare Ponticelli =

World War I veteran, piping and metal worker

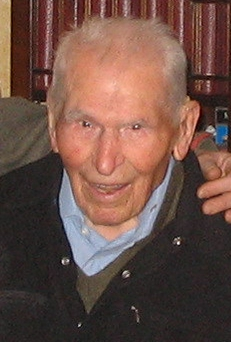
- Lazare Ponticelli in 2006
- Born: 7 December 1897 (Note: Ponticelli's date of birth, according to the civil registry, was 7 December 1897. Ponticelli's mother remembered giving birth on 24 December (Christmas Eve) and that a snowstorm delayed any exit from the house for three days.); Bettola, Kingdom of Italy
- Died: 12 March 2008 (aged 110 years, 79 days); Le Kremlin-Bicêtre, France
- Military career
- Allegiance: France (1914–1915); Italy (1915–1920)
- Branch: French Army; Italian Army; French Resistance
- Service years: 1914–1920
- Conflicts: World War I World War II
- Awards: Croix de Guerre; Médaille Interalliée; Légion d'honneur Ordine di Vittorio Veneto
- Other work: Piping and metal work

Lazare Ponticelli (born Lazzaro Ponticelli; 7 December 1897 – 12 March 2008), Knight of Vittorio Veneto, was at 110, the last surviving officially recognized veteran of the First World War from France and the last poilu of its trenches to die. (Note: In June 2008, three months after Ponticelli's death, Fernand Goux was discovered to be a French veteran. However, Goux was not officially recognized as a poilu, or foot soldier, even though he was called up for service on 19 April, since he was only in the trenches from 3 November 1918 to the signing of the armistice on 11 November 1918. Pierre Picault survived Goux by less than two weeks, but himself was an artilleryman who served less than three months, and is likewise not recognized by the French government as an "official" WWI veteran.)

Born in Italy, he travelled on his own to France at the age of eight. Aged 16, he lied about his age in order to join the French Army at the start of the war in 1914, before being transferred against his will to the Italian Army the following year. After the war, he came back to Paris where he and his brothers founded the piping and metal work company Ponticelli Frères ('Ponticelli Brothers'), which produced supplies for the Second World War effort and as of August 2024, is still in business. He also worked with the French Resistance against the Nazis.

Ponticelli was the oldest living man of Italian birth and the oldest man living in France at the time of his death. Every Armistice Day until 2007 he attended ceremonies honoring deceased veterans. In his later years, he criticized war, and stored his awards from the First World War in a shoe box. While he felt unworthy of the state funeral the French government offered him, he eventually accepted one. However, he asked that the procession emphasise the common soldiers who died on the battlefield. French president Nicolas Sarkozy honored his wish and dedicated a plaque to them at the procession.

== Early life ==
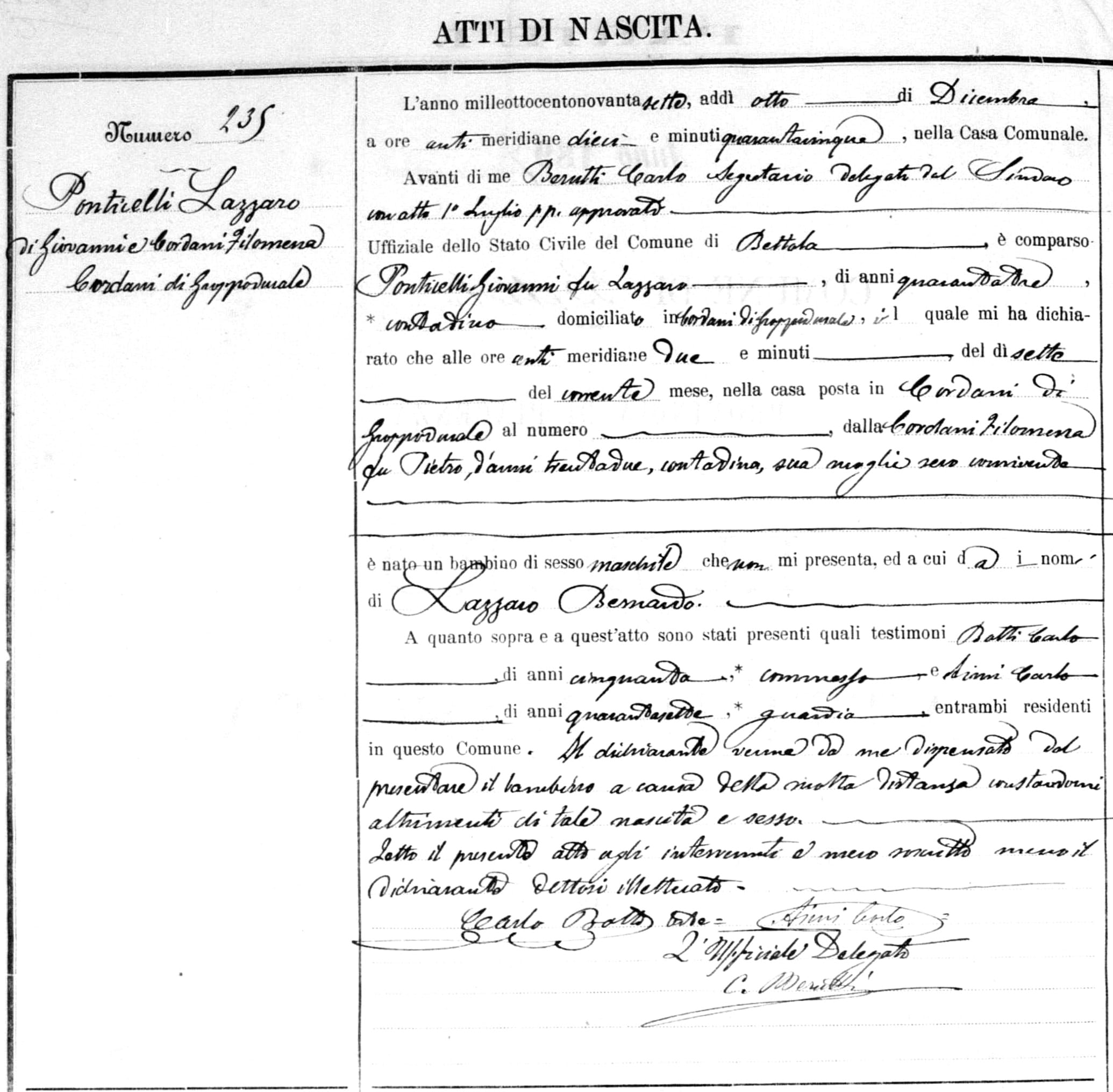
Birth record of Lazare Ponticelli, issued in Bettola, Italy

Born as Lazzaro Bernardo Ponticelli in Cordani di Groppoducale, a frazione (civil parish) in Bettola, Piacenza, Emilia-Romagna, in northern Italy, he was raised in a mountain hamlet in Bettola, one of seven children born to Giovanni Ponticelli and Filomena Cordani. His father sold livestock on the fairgrounds and occasionally worked as a carpenter and cobbler.

His mother cultivated the family's small plot of land and, like many women of the area, commuted three times a year to the Po Valley to work in its rice fields. Despite the Ponticelli family's hard work, they were impoverished and the children often went to bed on an empty stomach. When Lazare was two years of age, his mother moved to France to earn a better living. After the unexpected deaths of Jean Ponticelli and his eldest son, Pierre, the rest of the family moved to Paris, leaving Lazare in the care of neighbors.

At age six, Ponticelli started several jobs, including making clogs. By 1906, aged eight years old, he had saved enough money to buy a railway ticket to Paris, which he considered "paradise". To travel to the capital of France, he walked 21 miles (34 km) to the nearest train station at Piacenza. He could not speak French, but found work as a chimney sweep in Nogent-sur-Marne and later as a paper boy in Paris. He obtained a work permit at age 13.

== World War I ==
In August 1914, aged 16, shortly after the outbreak of World War I, Ponticelli was assigned to the 4th Marching Regiment of the 1st Foreign Regiment of the French Foreign Legion. He had lied about his age to enlist. He rediscovered his older brother, Céleste Ponticelli, who had joined the same regiment. According to Ponticelli, France had done much for him, and serving was his way of showing his gratitude. He served at Soissons in Picardy, northeast France, and at Douaumont, near Verdun. Ponticelli worked at digging burial pits and trenches. In keeping a promise to Céleste to always assist others, he rescued a German and a French soldier who were wounded in the arm and leg, respectively.

Ponticelli was not a French citizen and in May 1915, when Italy entered the war, he was conscripted into the Italian Army. Although he attempted to remain with his French regiment, he eventually enlisted in the 3rd Alpini Regiment, after being escorted to Turin by two gendarmes. Ponticelli saw service against the Austro-Hungarian Army at Mount Piccolo on the Austria–Italy border.

At his new post as a machine gunner, Ponticelli was seriously wounded by a shell during an assault on an Austrian mountain position. He was returned to his post after rest and recuperation in Naples. In an undated interview, he described being injured: "Blood was running into my eyes... I continued firing despite my wound."

Once, his regiment ceased fighting the Austrians for three weeks. The armies, who mostly spoke each other's tongue, swapped loaves of bread for tobacco and photographed each other. In 1918 Ponticelli was gassed in an Austrian attack that killed hundreds of his fellow soldiers. Reflecting on war, he said: "You shoot at men who are fathers. War is completely stupid." In one of his last interviews, Ponticelli stated he was amazed at his own survival.

== Ponticelli Frères ==
The "Ponticelli Brothers".

After being demobilized in 1920, Ponticelli founded a metal work company with Céleste and Bonfils, his older brothers, which they called "Ponticelli Frères" ("Ponticelli Brothers"). Located in the 13th arrondissement of Paris, it became profitable and well known in its field. It was incorporated as a private limited company in 1932, when its primary work was with industrial chimneys.

During the Second World War, the Ponticelli brothers, who became French citizens in 1939, were too old for combat but supported the war effort by supplying soldiers with their products. They moved the factory into the zone libre (unoccupied zone) after Germany invaded and occupied northern France. After Vichy France was taken over by the Germans, they returned northwards and began working with the Resistance. In the aftermath of World War II, they added a piping department to their company.

Lazare continued managing the company with his brothers until his retirement in 1960. At the time of his death it was reported that the company had 4,000 employees and its annual revenue (2005) was €300 million (more than €1 billion in 2023). The company now operates in several countries outside France, mainly across Europe and Africa.

== Later life ==
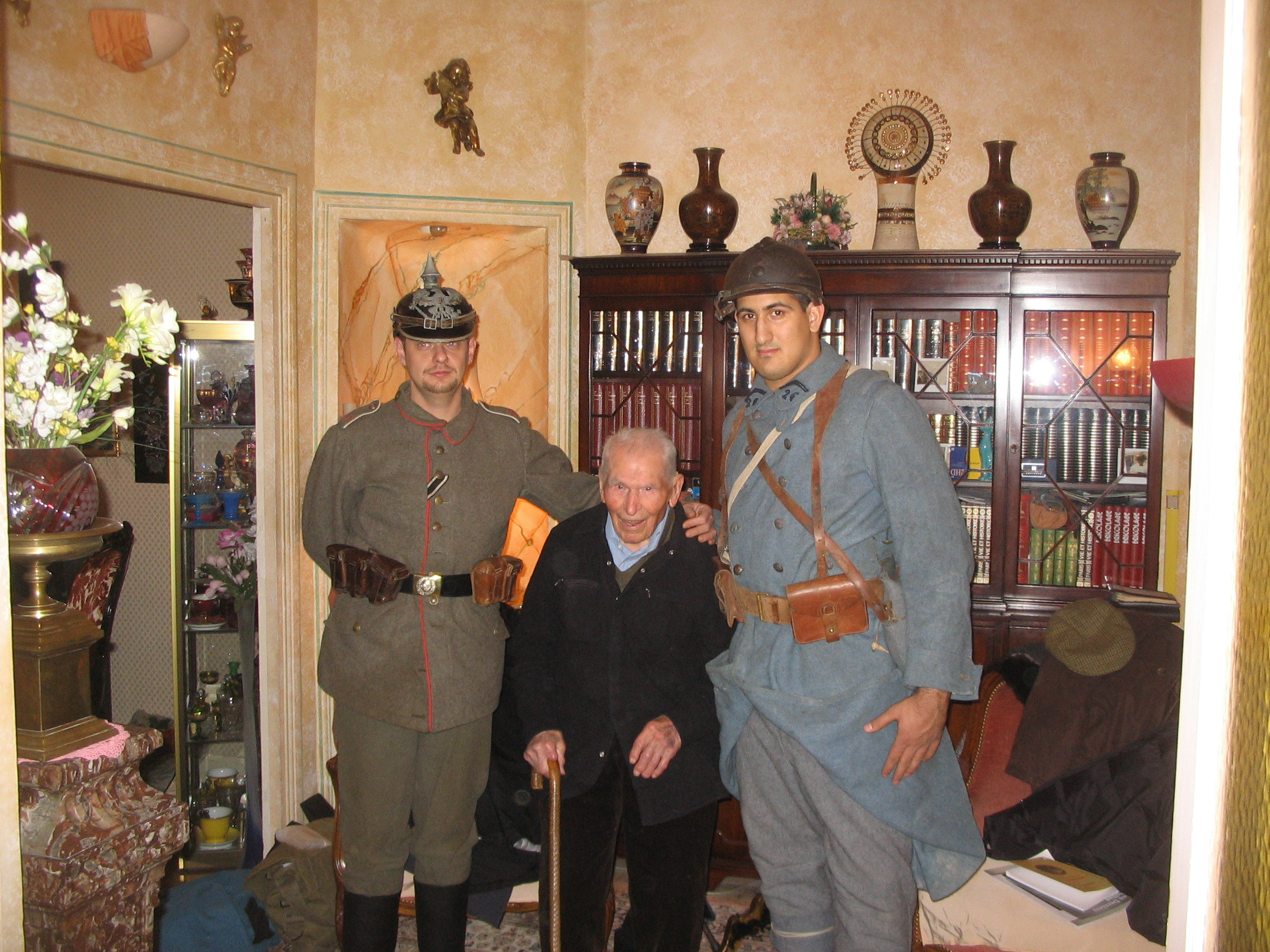
Lazare Ponticelli (center) between two reenactment members in old uniforms in 2006

Until his death, Ponticelli lived with his daughter in the Paris suburb of Le Kremlin-Bicêtre, and every 11 November until 2007 he attended Armistice Day ceremonies. An honored citizen of his adopted town, Ponticelli voted in the 2007 presidential and legislative elections. He officially became a supercentenarian on 24 December 2007, celebrating his official 110th birthday at the National History of Immigration Museum. He kept his war medals in a shoebox.

When originally offered a state funeral by then French President Jacques Chirac, Ponticelli asserted that he did not want one, although the death of the penultimate recognized soldier,^{[b]} Louis de Cazenave, on 20 January 2008 caused him to reconsider. He eventually accepted a small ceremony "in the name of all those who died, men and women," during World War I.

Today, I express the nation's deep emotion and infinite sadness. I salute the Italian boy who came to Paris to earn his living and chose to become French, first in August 1914 when he lied about his age to sign up at 16 for the French Foreign Legion to defend his adopted homeland. Then a second time in 1921, when he decided to remain here for good.

— Nicolas Sarkozy, President of France

== Death ==
Ponticelli died at 12:45 pm (11:45 GMT) at his home in Le Kremlin-Bicêtre on 12 March 2008, aged 110. At the time of his death, Ponticelli was the oldest living man of Italian birth and the oldest man living in France. Nicolas Sarkozy, the French president, released a statement and said there would be a day of national remembrance for the war dead of France. Ponticelli had at least one child, his then-78-year-old daughter, Janine Desbaucheron.

His state funeral was held on 17 March 2008. The mass was held at Saint-Louis Cathedral in Les Invalides and was attended by government ministers, soldiers and members of Ponticelli's family. French academic Max Gallo delivered the eulogy. At the mass, French collégien Guillaume Kaleff read a poem written by his class in Ponticelli's honor.

Flags were ordered to be flown at half mast while Sarkozy unveiled a plaque dedicated to the veterans of World War I. Legionnaires of the 3rd Foreign Infantry Regiment, heir to the Marching Regiment of the French Foreign Legion, the same regiment that Ponticelli fought in, carried his coffin at the funeral. After the procession, he was buried in his family's plot at Ivry Cemetery, Ivry-sur-Seine.

== Legacy ==
On 11 November 2008, during the first Armistice Day since his death, Rue de Verdun in Le Kremlin-Bicêtre was renamed Rue de Verdun-Lazare-Ponticelli.

== See also ==
- List of last surviving World War I veterans by country
- Marching Regiment of the Foreign Legion
