= Order of Vittorio Veneto =

Italian military order

Order of Vittorio Veneto Ordine di Vittorio Veneto
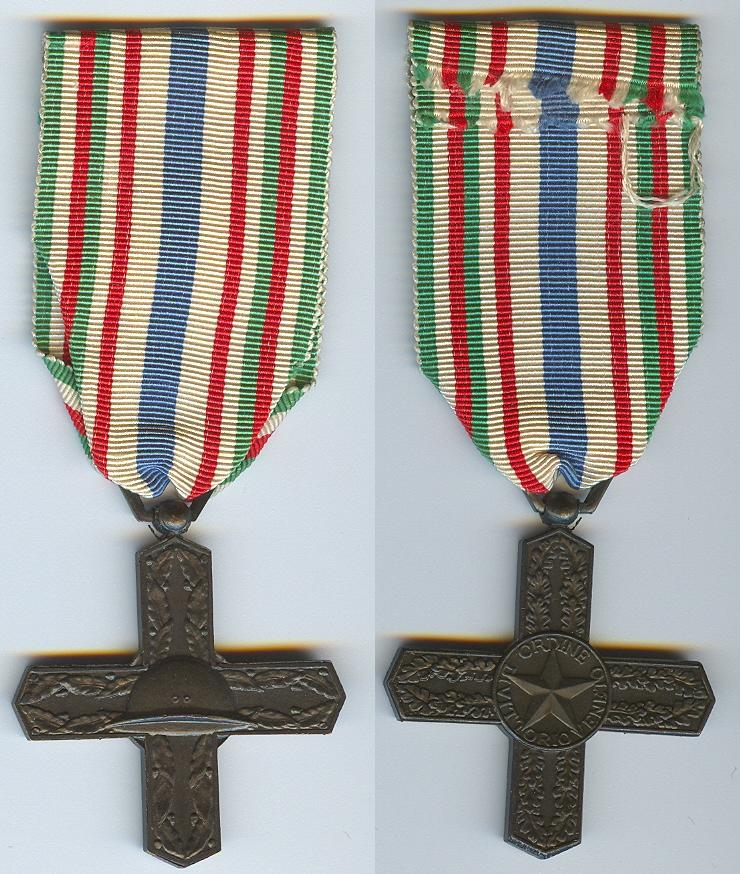
- Obverse and reverse

Awarded by the Italian Republic
- Type: Order of chivalry
- Established: 18 March 1968; 58 years ago
- Country: Italy
- Eligibility: Military veterans
- Criteria: Service for 1915–1918 and earlier conflicts
- Status: Abolished
- Founder: Giuseppe Saragat
- Grand Master: President of the Republic
- Council Chair: Army Corps General
- Grades: Knight
- Post-nominals: OVV
- Website: www.quirinale.it/page/vittorioveneto

Statistics
- Last induction: 15 March 2010

Precedence
- Next (higher): Order of the Star of Italy
- Next (lower): War Cross of Military Valor
- Ribbon of the order

The military Order of Vittorio Veneto (Italian: Ordine di Vittorio Veneto) was an Italian order of chivalry that was founded as national order by the fifth President of the Italian Republic, Giuseppe Saragat, in 1968, "to express the gratitude of the nation" to those decorated with the Medal and the War Cross of Military Valor (Medaglia e Croce di Guerra al Valor Militare) who had fought for at least six months in World War I and earlier conflicts.

The Order is awarded in the single degree of Knight.

Being awarded more than 50 years after the War, most of the recipients were retired from employment. For the Knights who did not enjoy an income above their tax allowance, a small annuity was granted in favor of those recipients, payable to the widow or minor children on death. The allowance was also granted to those that fought in the former Austro-Hungarian armed forces who became Italian citizens after annexation.

Ribbon	Class	Full title
	Knight	Cavaliere dell'Ordine di Vittorio Veneto

The order was bestowed by decree of the President of the Italian Republic, its head, on the recommendation of the Minister of Defence. A Lieutenant General chaired the council, which investigated applications made by eligible parties to the municipality of residence. With the death of the last surviving Knights of Vittorio Veneto in 2008, the order fell into abeyance and, in 2008, it was formally wound-up by repeal of the original legislation. It was revived anyway on 15 March 2010 in spite of being still abeyant.

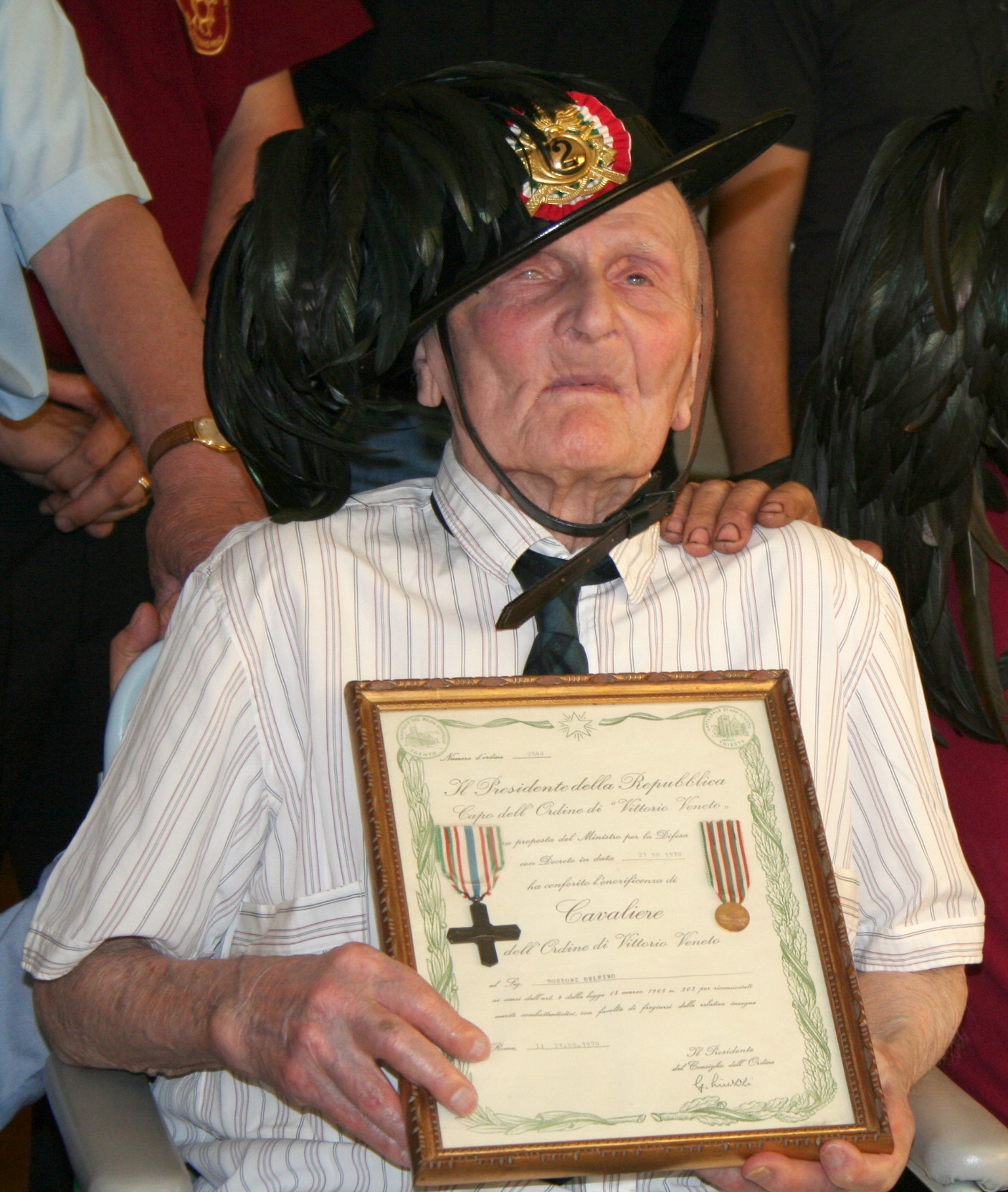
Cav. Delfino Borroni, one of the last Knights of Vittorio Veneto, died at age 110 on 26 October 2008.

Notable recipients	Death date and age
Cav. Girolamo Angelini	22 May 1991 (aged 91)
Cav. Giuseppe Arena	19 March 1978 (aged 85)
Cav. Ettore Bastico	2 December 1972 (aged 96)
Cav. Delfino Borroni	26 October 2008 (aged 110)
Cav. Francesco Domenico Chiarello	27 June 2008 (aged 109)
Cav. Carlo Azeglio Ciampi	16 September 2016 (aged 95)
Cav. Pietro Micheletti	25 March 2005 (aged 105)
Cav. Guglielmo Nasi	21 September 1971 (aged 92)
Cav. Carmine Pavia	26 October 1974 (aged 87)
Cav. Domenico Piroli	25 January 1972 (aged 72)
Cav. Lazare Ponticelli	12 March 2008 (aged 110)
Cav. Filippo Rizzo	1 February 1984 (aged 89)
Cav. Marcantonio Rositano	18 February 1977 (aged 88)
Cav. Ugo Matteucci	1982 (aged 85)
Cav. Ilario Cardarelli	2nd April 1984 (aged 87)
Cav. Italo Sarrocco	8 January 1973 (aged 102)
Cav. Leonardo Giovanni Specchia	8 January 1973 (aged 87)

== See also ==
- List of Italian orders of knighthood
- Military Order of Italy
