= Fernand Goux =

French soldier and centenarian (1899–2008)

- Born: 31 December 1899; Sceaux-du-Gâtinais, Loiret, France
- Died: 9 November 2008 (aged 108)
- Military career
- Allegiance: France
- Branch: French Army
- Service years: 1918–1921
- Units: 82nd Infantry Regiment; 85th Infantry Regiment
- Conflicts: World War I

Fernand Goux (31 December 1899 – 9 November 2008) was, at age 108, the penultimate French World War I veteran, with Pierre Picault being the last.

== Biography ==
Born in Sceaux-du-Gâtinais, Loiret, Goux was called up for service on 19 April 1918. Goux was deployed behind the front lines with the 85th Infantry Regiment, supplying the troops and burying the dead. On 3 November 1918, he was sent to the front line with the 82nd Infantry Regiment for the last week of the war. This made him one of two remaining trench veterans, along with Englishman Harry Patch.

However the French government did not recognize Goux as a poilu as he fought less than the requisite three months. The last official veteran thus remains Italian-born Lazare Ponticelli, who was buried with state honours on 17 March 2008, with Louis de Cazenave the last recognized native Frenchman to have served. After the war Goux worked as a farmer and he lived in the Île-de-France region.

== See also ==
- List of last surviving World War I veterans by country
