= Poilu =

Historical slang for French infantrymen

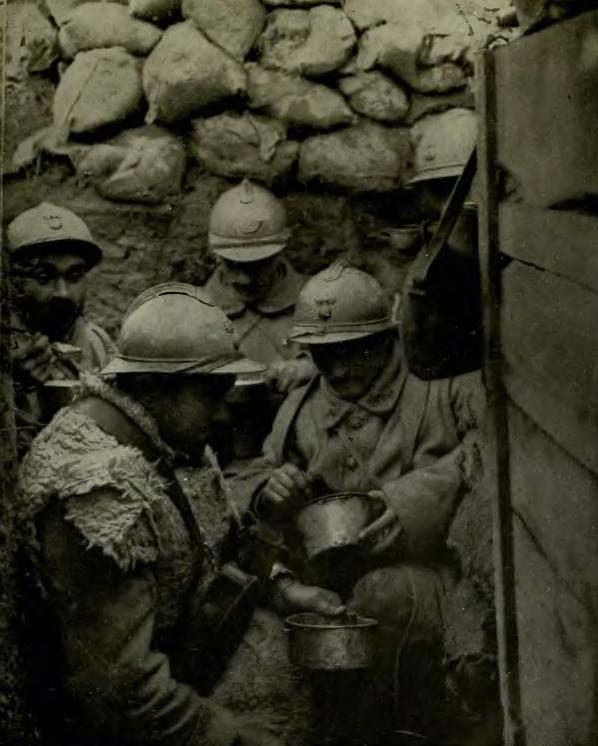
Poilus in a trench

Poilu (/ˈpwɑːluː/; French: [pwaly]) is an informal term for a late 18th century–early 20th century French infantryman, meaning, literally, 'hairy one'. It is still widely used as a term of endearment for the French infantry of World War I. The word carries the sense of the infantryman's typically rustic, agricultural background, and derives from the bushy moustaches and other facial hair affected by many French soldiers after the outbreak of the war as a sign of masculinity. The poilu was particularly known for his love of pinard, his ration of cheap wine.

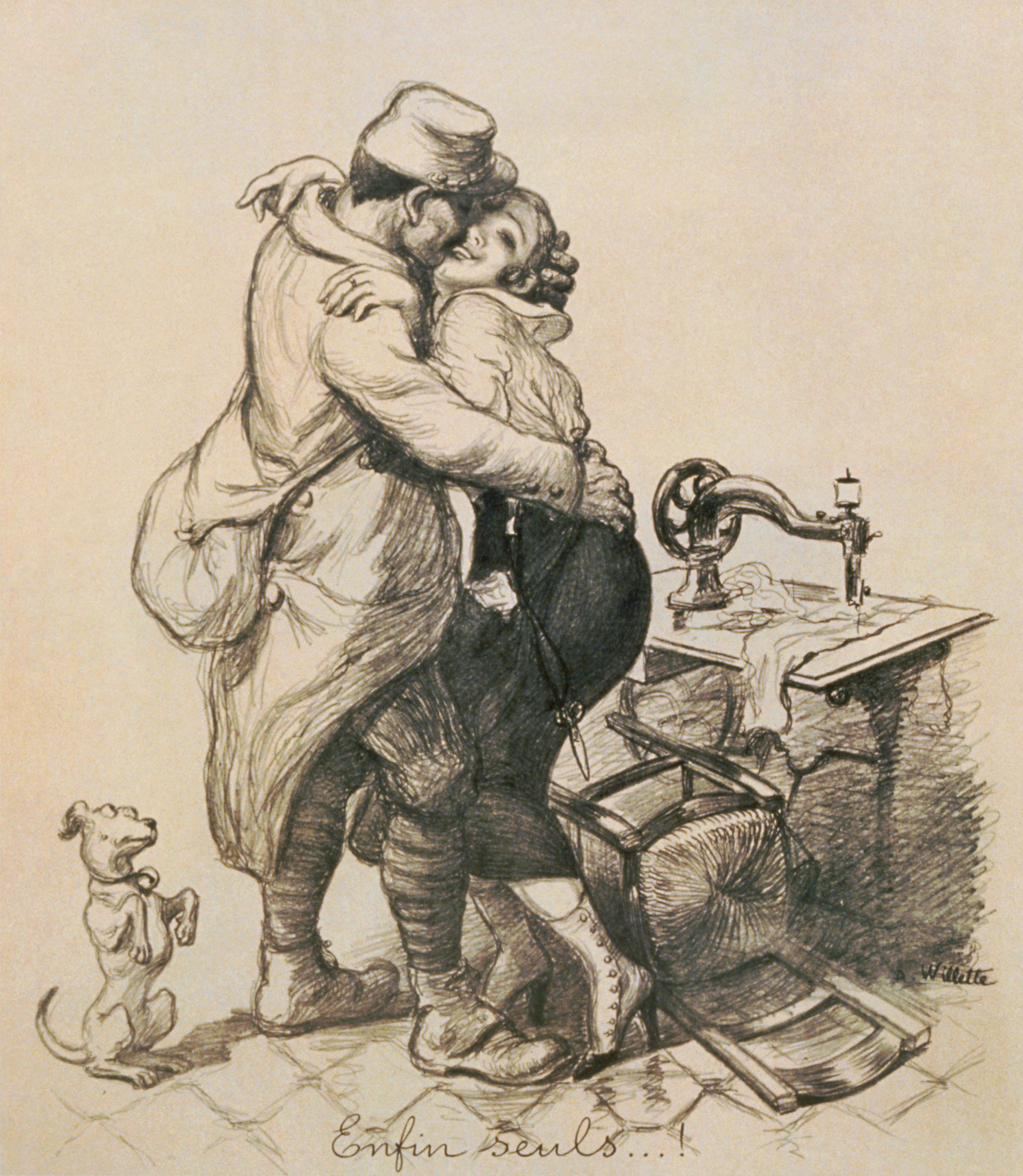
Journée du Poilu. 25 et 26 décembre 1915 (transl. The poilu's holiday, December 25 and 26, 1915). French World War I poster by Adolphe Willette about a poilu's Christmas leave from the front.

The image of the dogged, bearded French soldier was widely used in propaganda and war memorials. The stereotype of the poilu was of bravery and endurance, but not always of unquestioning obedience. At the disastrous Chemin des Dames offensive of 1917 under General Robert Nivelle, they were said to have gone into no man's land making bleating noises—a collective bit of gallows humour signalling the idea that they were being sent as lambs to the slaughter. Outstanding for its mixture of horror and heroism, this spectacle proved a sobering one. As the news of it spread, the French high command soon found itself coping with a widespread mutiny. A minor revolution was averted only with the promise of an end to the costly offensive.

The last surviving poilu from World War I was Pierre Picault. However, French authorities recognised Lazare Ponticelli—who had served in the French Foreign Legion as an Italian citizen—as the last poilu, as he was the last veteran whose service met the strict official criteria. Lazare Ponticelli died in Le Kremlin-Bicêtre on 12 March 2008, aged 110.

== See also ==
- A Very Long Engagement, a French film in which poilus are featured
- Verdun: Visions of History, a silent French film about poilus in the Battle of Verdun
- Digger, referring to Australian and New Zealand soldiers
- Doughboy, referring to American soldiers
- Mehmetçik, referring to Ottoman soldiers
- Tommy, referring to British soldiers
