= Bill Stone (Royal Navy sailor) =

English World War I veteran (1900–2009)

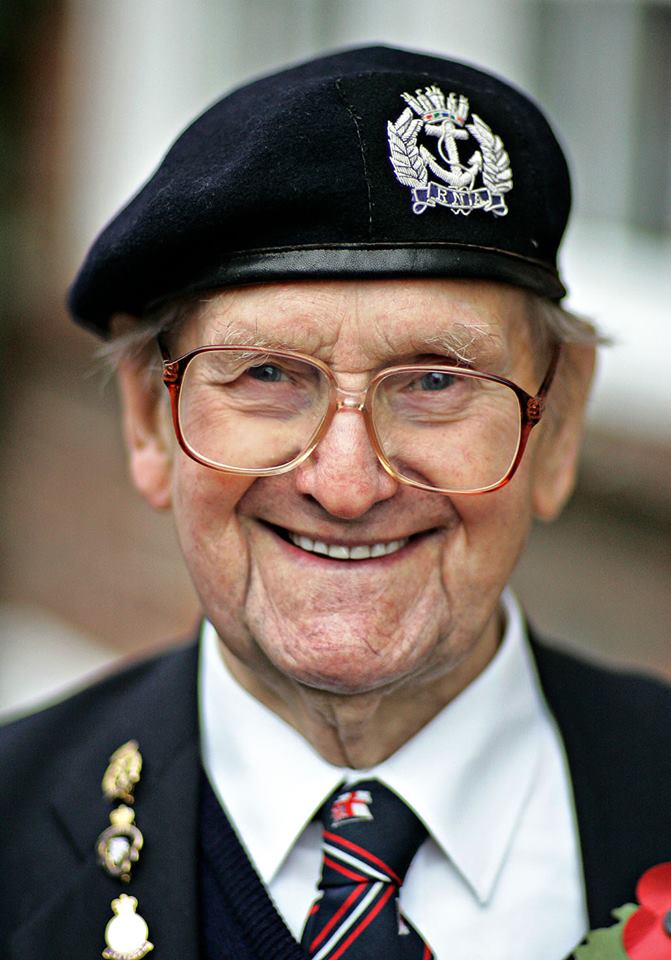
- Bill Stone photographed in Watlington, Oxfordshire, November 2006.
- Born: William Frederick Stone; 23 September 1900; Ledstone, Devon, England
- Died: 10 January 2009 (aged 108); Sindlesham, Berkshire, England
- Military career
- Allegiance: United Kingdom
- Branch: Royal Navy
- Service years: 23 September 1918 – 18 September 1945
- Rank: Stoker Chief Petty Officer
- Units: Included: HMS Tiger; HMS Hood; HMS Salamander; HMS Newfoundland; See full list below for all ships
- Conflicts: First World War; Second World War: Arctic convoys; Allied invasion of Sicily
- Awards: Mentioned in Despatches; See full list below for details of campaign and commemorative medals awarded
- Other work: Barber

William Frederick Stone (23 September 1900 – 10 January 2009) was one of the last five surviving First World War veterans who served in the United Kingdom's armed forces and one of the last two surviving seamen worldwide, along with Claude Choules. They were also the last two to have also served in the Second World War, although Stone saw action only in the Second World War as he was still in training when the First World War ended.

Stone was born in Ledstone, Kingsbridge, Devon and enlisted in the Royal Navy on his 18th birthday. He served on board HMS Tiger shortly after the end of the First World War, before serving on a number of ships including HMS Hood. At the beginning of the Second World War Stone was serving on the minesweeper HMS Salamander before moving onto the light cruiser HMS Newfoundland in 1941. After the war, he ran his own barber's shop. In his later years Stone was present at many memorial services including the 90th anniversary commemorations at the Cenotaph in London.

== Early life ==
Stone was born in Ledstone, Devon, as the tenth of fourteen children, and enlisted into the Royal Navy on his 18th birthday. Two of his older brothers had already joined the navy, and a third was in the army. He had first tried to join up at the age of fifteen, walking three miles from where he was working on a farm, to Kingsbridge, to collect the attestation papers, but his father refused to countersign them.

== Naval service ==
The first record of his naval service describes him as being 5 feet 5.5 inches (1.664 m) tall, with a 32.5 in (83 cm) chest, brown hair and blue eyes, and his prior occupation as stationary engine driver. He trained as a Stoker in Plymouth, and could remember the dancing in the streets on Armistice Day. His first position was as a Stoker aboard the battlecruiser HMS Tiger, and by summer 1919 was at the main wartime Royal Navy base at Scapa Flow, here he was a witness to the scuttling of the German fleet.

He remained in the navy after the war, serving on HMS Hood during the 1920s, including a round-the-world "Empire Cruise" showing the flag in British colonies from 1922 to 1924. By the outbreak of the Second World War he was Chief Stoker of the Halcyon-class minesweeper HMS Salamander. On her he participated in the evacuation of Dunkirk, with Salamander making five shuttle trips and picking up over a 1,000 men from the beaches. He later described his experience there for the Oxford Mail:

Dunkirk was the worst experience of my life ... I saw hundreds of people killed in front of me. Some had no clothes on and were shot and bombed as they swam out to boats. There were oil tanks burning, ships sinking and hundreds of soldiers lined up on the beaches.

He served on the Arctic convoys and in the Mediterranean, and was also torpedoed twice. The second time was while serving aboard the Fiji-class light cruiser HMS Newfoundland during the Allied invasion of Sicily, when it was torpedoed by the German submarine U-407. Following temporary repairs in Malta, the ship limped across the Atlantic steering using only its two propellers, for full repair at the Boston Navy Yard. He was Mentioned in Despatches on 21 December 1943 for his service on this occasion. He served with the occupation forces in north Germany, and was a Stoker Chief Petty Officer when he left the navy in 1945.

== Family ==
William married Lily Margaret E Hoskin (1908–1995) in Kingsbridge in June 1938 . The marriage lasted fifty-seven years until Lily's death in 1995. The couple had one daughter Anne.

Anne married Michael J Davidson in Kensington, London in 1967. The couple had two children: Christopher and Susan.

== Later life ==
Following the end of the Second World War in 1945, Stone left the Navy. After the war, he ran his own barber's shop, where he also sold cigarettes and smoking tobacco, he retired in 1968.

He retired in 1968 at the age of sixty-seven. By 1986 Lily's health began to decline, diagnosed with critical arthritis, the couple temporarily moved into Primley House in Paignton, before a more permanent move to Watlington in Oxfordshire, to be near their daughter, Anne, son-in-law Michael and their grandchildren, Christopher and Susan who lived in Buckinghamshire. As the years passed by, Lily became more disabled by her arthritis eventually becoming unable to walk; however, Bill said that "mentally she was always bright. I was happy that she was able to stay at home and that I was able to look after her. At that time we had a cottage hospital – Watlington Hospital – where eventually she used to go each month to give us both a rest".

Lily died in 1995, aged eighty-seven, leaving Bill a widower. The local community looked after him. "On my first Sunday at church following her death General Sir John Mogg and his wife, Margaret, who lived in the village, said to me 'William, you are to sit with us now.' As I got to know them better I found out that Lady Mogg's sister, Sarah MacKinnon, had been married to a naval man. He had, in fact, been Flag Lieutenant to Admiral Evans of the Broke in H.M.S. Carlisle at the same time as I had served in that ship on the Africa Station back in 1936!"

He attended the sixtieth anniversary of the Dunkirk evacuations in 2000, outliving the Dunkirk Veterans' Association which disbanded after this commemoration.

In 2005, Stone became Fox FM's Local Hero and Central Television's Personality of the Year.

In his last years Bill attended reunions for HMS Hood and HMS Newfoundland in which he met up with fellow Hood survivor and veteran Ted Briggs (pictured together below). Bill commented:

"Michael and Anne drive me to the annual re-unions of H.M.S. Newfoundland, H.M.S. Hood, and The George Cross Island Associations. At the 2005 Hood re-union I met Heinrich Kuhnt who is a survivor of the Bismarck, which sank the Hood in 1941. The President of the Association is Ted Briggs, now the only living survivor of that sinking, the other two having died since. At the Sunday church parade the Padre always encourages me to sing 'All the Nice Girls Love a Sailor!' which I do, but follow up with my favourite hymn, 'Abide with me'! I also try to attend the annual Hood memorial service at Boldre village church, near Lymington, which is usually held around the same time of the year."

In 2006, Bill, as he was known had a fall and broke his hip at the age of 106. Due to his increasing old age, he was forced to leave Watlington, Oxfordshire and move into a retirement facility in Sindlesham, a suburb of Winnersh, which lies between Reading and Wokingham, in 2007. Stone's son-in-law, Michael Davidson issued a statement about his father-in-law's condition:

"He had a fall and developed a small infection, so doctors gave him antibiotics which seem to be working. He is obviously being observed very closely because of his age, but we have no reason to believe his condition will worsen"

On 11 November 2008, Stone along with fellow veterans, Henry Allingham and Harry Patch laid commemorative wreaths at the Cenotaph in London to mark the ninetieth anniversary of the end of the First World War.

Stone died at Lord Harris Court Care Home in Sindlesham in Berkshire, on 10 January 2009, aged 108. His daughter described him as a "very determined character [...] a man of great faith and his recipe for long life was: 'Clean living, contented mind and trust in God.' His motto: 'Keep going.'" His funeral was held on 29 January 2009 at St Leonard's Church, Watlington. In September 2009, memoirs detailing Stone's experience of the two world wars were published.

== Medals ==
Stone received many medals in his 27-year career in the Navy. These included campaign medals and commemorative medals issued on anniversaries and commemorations.

British Empire Campaign Medals

- British War Medal for the First World War 1914–1920 campaign

British Commonwealth Campaign Medals

- 1939–1945 Star for the Second World War campaign
- Atlantic Star (with clasp) for the Second World War Battle of the Atlantic campaign (clasp denotes entitlement to the 'France and Germany Star')
- Africa Star for the Second World War Africa 1940–43 campaign
- Italy Star for the Second World War 1943–45 campaign
- Defence Medal for the Second World War 1939–45 campaign
- War Medal 1939–1945 (with Oak Leaf) for the Second World War 1939–45 campaign (Oak Leaf signifying a Mention in Despatches)
- Naval Long Service and Good Conduct Medal (1848) for 15 years or longer service with the Royal Navy

Foreign Medals

- Malta George Cross Fiftieth Anniversary Medal for qualifying service on Malta 10 June 1940 to 8 September 1943
- Jubilee Medal "Forty Years of Victory in the Great Patriotic War 1941–1945" (for Arctic convoy service), also known as the Russian Convoy Medal 1941–1945 40th Anniversary Medal
- Jubilee Medal "50 Years of Victory in the Great Patriotic War 1941–1945" (for Arctic convoy service), also known as the Russian Convoy Medal 1941–1945 50th Anniversary Medal.

Commemorative Medals

- Dunkirk Medal for Veterans of the Dunkirk Evacuation 1940

The Dunkirk and 50th Anniversary Russian commemorative medals are not officially recognised by The Queen and should not be worn on formal occasions. However, it is usual to wear official medals on the left chest lapel and have unofficial medals form a second row underneath. Bill Stone wore his medals in this manner.

== Ships ==
The following is a list of the seagoing vessels on which Stone served. At various times he was posted to shore establishments for training or other duties. Smaller vessels were also officially assigned to a depot ship.

- HMS Tiger Battle cruiser – 1919–1922
- HMS Hood Battle cruiser – 1922–1924
- HMS Chrysanthemum Sloop – 1925–1927
- HMS P40 Submarine Chaser – 1928–29
- HMS Eagle Aircraft carrier – 1929–1931
- HMS Harebell Sloop – 1931–1933
- HMS Thanet Destroyer – 1933–1934
- HMS Tenedos Destroyer – 1933–1934
- HMS Carlisle Light cruiser – 1934–1937
- HMS Salamander Mine sweeper – 1937–1941
- HMS Newfoundland Light cruiser – 1941–1944

== See also ==
- List of last surviving World War I veterans
