= Fylde Memorial Arboretum and Community Woodland =

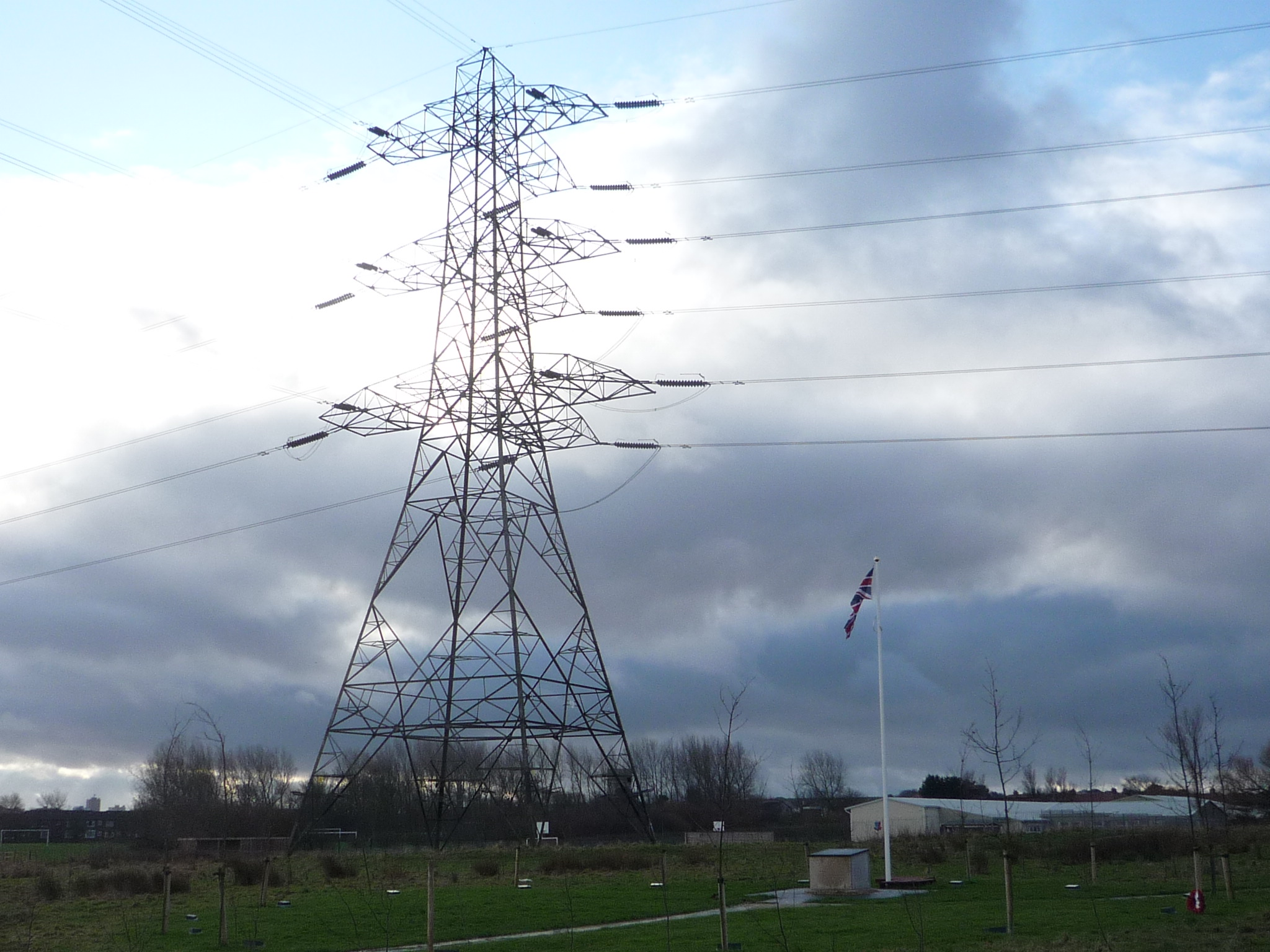

- Location within Blackpool Location within Lancashire
- Type: Arboretum
- Location: Moor Park, Bispham, Blackpool, Lancashire, England
- Coordinates: 53.84767°N 3.02748°W
- Area: 2 hectares (4.9 acres)
- Created: 23 February 2009
- Operator: Arboretum Committee, Fylde Ex-Service Liaison Committee

Fylde Memorial Arboretum and Community Woodland is a site of remembrance at Bispham, Blackpool, Lancashire, England. It is the only one of its kind outside the National Memorial Arboretum, Alrewas, Staffordshire.

Its stated aim is to

provide the service associations, and the people of Blackpool and the Fylde, with a place of peace and beauty in which to remember their fallen comrades and loved ones.

== Origins ==
The idea for the arboretum and community woodland was conceived by Don Aiken, the vice-president of the Fylde Ex-Service Liaison Committee in the summer of 2008. Investigating the possibility of planting a memorial tree to commemorate comrades of the D-Day and Normandy Veterans, an article in the Blackpool Gazette from the Forestry Commission offered to fund the planting of woodland areas. After he contacted them they agreed to fund the arboretum, and subsequently, Blackpool Council agreed to provide the land.

== History ==
The arboretum was unveiled on 23 February 2009 following a £14,000 grant from the Forestry Commission English Woodland Grant Scheme and funds from First TransPennine Express. Blackpool Council's Parks Service designed the plans for the memorial woodland, while rangers worked with local school children and community groups to plant trees.

Officially opened on 26 June 2009 with a service of dedication, the arboretum has a main memorial plaque as well as 16 smaller plinths. It is run by the Arboretum Committee, an offshoot of the Fylde Ex-Service Liaison Committee, with the aim of providing the service associations, and the people of Blackpool and the Fylde, with "a place of peace and beauty in which to remember their fallen comrades and loved ones". The woodland has 2,500 trees, from the Forestry Commission, all planted and available for dedication.

In August 2009, the arboretum and woodland, which covers two hectares, received a grant of £35,000 from the Forestry Commission for the purchase of trees and the construction of paths.

== Location ==
Located in fields next to Moor Park School, Moor Park Avenue, in the Bispham area of Blackpool, on a site covering two hectares, it contains a multitude of young trees of diverse size and species with the intention of these trees developing over time into a well kept woodland.

=== Services Glade ===
At the centre of the Memorial Arboretum's "Services Glade" area is a simple monument topped by a large inscribed slab of polished black granite. A large flag pole stands permanently flying the Union Flag.

This is surrounded by a circle of 16 young oak trees, which were dedicated by member associations of the Fylde Ex-Service Liaison Committee, and special ex-service organisations connected with the Blackpool, Fylde and Wyre areas. At the base of each tree is a polished black granite plaque, inscribed with a badge and an epitaph.

Around this an outer circle of Downy Birch trees has been planted by the parks department in 2010 to supply the need for further ex-service dedicated plaques.

=== Millennium Grove ===
Alongside the glade is the Millennium Grove, another defined wooded area. This is devoted to the memory of service people, previously resident in the Blackpool, Fylde and Wyre boroughs, who were killed on active service this millennium. Commemorative plaques are placed alongside selected trees. By 2012, eight plaques were place in commemoration of local service people.

=== The Jim Houldsworth Bower ===
In 2012 Major Jim Houldsworth, a beloved leader and champion of the ex-service community, died. In his memory a new area was defined and named "The Jim Houldsworth Bower". This was planted with a half-circle of lovely Rowan trees in which was placed a memorial boulder and a timber bench inscribed with the Fylde Ex-Service Liaison Committee name and logo.

=== Community woodland ===
In the remaining woodland anyone in the community can commemorate a loved one by arranging to have a standard plaque set against a tree.

== Memorial plaques ==
The Services Glade in the arboretum has one main monument and many plaques. The official monument bears, on its black granite top, the inscription:

THIS MONUMENT WAS ERECTED IN THIS COMMUNITY WOODLAND,

THE FYLDE MEMORIAL ARBORETUM,
FOR THE FYLDE EX-SERVICE LIAISON COMMITTEE, IN JUNE 2009.
THE TREES WILL PROVIDE A HAVEN OF PEACE AND BEAUTY FOR ALL
WHO VISIT, AND SERVE AS A LIVING AND LASTING MEMORIAL TO

COMMEMORATE OUR FALLEN COMRADES AND LOVED ONES.

The 16 plaques in the inner circle are:

	Association	Inscription
1.	177 (Blackpool Airport) Squadron Air Training Corps	Air Training Corps. In memory of all the staff and cadets who have died while serving their communities
2.	Fellowship of the Services	In memory of companions of the 'Fellowship of the Services' who gave their lives in the service of their country
3.	Blackpool & Fylde Royal Artillery Association	In memory of members of the 'Royal Regiment of Artillery' who gave their lives in the service of their country
4.	Blackpool D-Day & Normandy Veterans' Association	In memory of the fallen comrades of Blackpool D-Day & Normandy Veterans. British Second Army 1944
5.	Blackpool & Fylde Branch Burma Star Association	Kohima Epitaph. When you go home tell them of us and say for your tomorrow we gave our today
6.	Fylde Ex-Service Liaison Committee	If you seek my monument, Look around you
7.	National Service Association Blackpool & District	National Service Association Blackpool & District; They answered the call and gave their all
8.	Royal Electrical and Mechanical Engineers	To all fallen and ex comrades of the Royal Electrical & Mechanical Engineers; Lancashire Branch of the REME Association
9.	Northern Malaya & Borneo Veterans Association	Omnius, Relictus, Aliquot – Aliquot, Relictus, Omnius; All Gave Some – Some Gave All
10.	Royal Air Forces Association	Blackpool Branch 209; Royal Air Forces Association; We will remember them
11.	Suez Veterans Association	Lest We Forget; 1945–1956
12.	Association of Jewish Ex-Servicemen and Women	Dedicated with gratitude & respect to the memory of comrades who laid down their lives for our freedom
13.	1940 Dunkirk Veterans Association	In Memory of Those who did not return Dunkirk 1940
14.	Merchant Navy Association	Dedicated by Blackpool Merchant Navy Association; To all Merchant Seafarers Past & Present
15.	12 Regiment Royal Artillery	12 Regiment Royal Artillery (The Lancashire & Cumbrian Gunners) "In Honour of Those Who Have Served"
16.	Blackpool, Fylde & Wyre Royal Marines Association	In Memory of all Fylde Coast Royal Marines who so faithfully served their country. Once a Marine – Always a Marine
