= Dunkirk evacuation =

Evacuation of Allied forces in mid-1940

Operation Dynamo
- Part of Battle of Dunkirk during the Battle of France in the Second World War
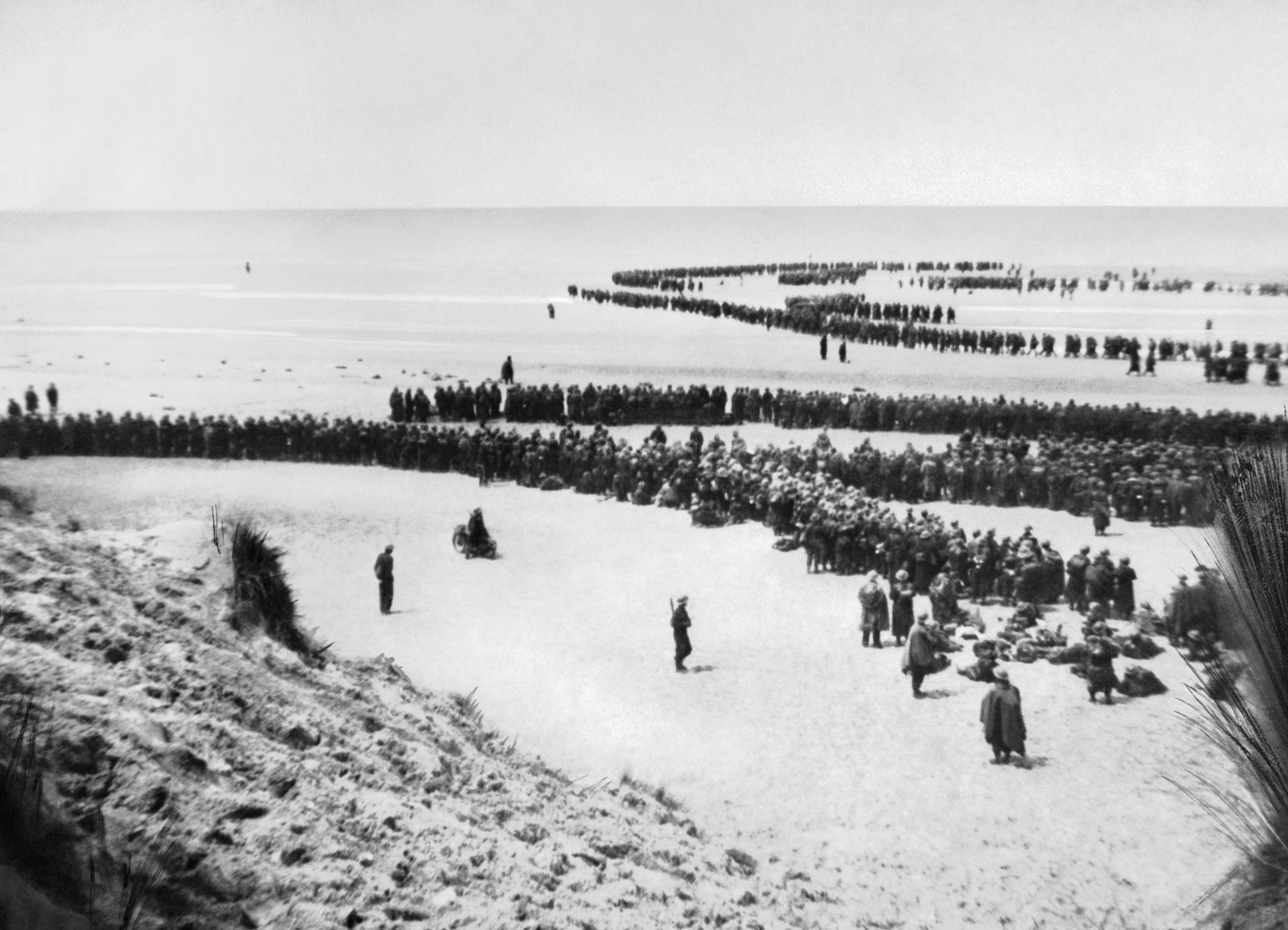
- British troops lined up on the beach awaiting evacuation
Date	26 May – 4 June 1940
Location	France, Dunkirk, and the English Channel 51°03′27″N 2°21′27″E
Result	Successful retreat; Evacuation of 338,226 soldiers

Belligerents
United Kingdom; (British Raj) India; Belgium; Canada; (French Third Republic) France; (French Third Republic) French West Africa; Netherlands; (Polish government-in-exile) Poland	Germany

Commanders and leaders
(United Kingdom) Lord Gort; (United Kingdom) Bertram Ramsay; (United Kingdom) Harold Alexander; (United Kingdom) William Tennant; (United Kingdom) Robert Peverell Hichens; (French Third Republic) J. M. Charles Abrial	(Nazi Germany) Gerd von Rundstedt; (Nazi Germany) Hermann Göring

Casualties and losses
About 2,000 troops killed during return voyages to England	

In the Dunkirk evacuation, codenamed Operation Dynamo and also known as the Miracle of Dunkirk, or just Dunkirk, more than 338,000 Allied soldiers were evacuated during the Second World War from the beaches and harbour of Dunkirk in northern France between 26 May and 4 June 1940. The operation began after large numbers of Belgian, British, and French troops (as well as smaller contingents of Dutch and Polish soldiers) were cut off and surrounded by German troops during the six-week Battle of France.

After Germany invaded Poland in September 1939, France and the British Empire declared war on Germany and imposed an economic blockade. The British Expeditionary Force (BEF) was sent to help defend France. After the Phoney War of October 1939 to April 1940, Germany invaded Belgium, the Netherlands, and France on 10 May 1940. Three panzer corps attacked through the Ardennes and drove northwest to the English Channel. By 21 May, German forces had trapped the BEF, the remains of the Belgian forces, and three French field armies along the northern coast of France. BEF commander General Viscount Gort immediately saw evacuation across the Channel as the best course of action, and began planning a withdrawal to Dunkirk, the closest good port.

Late on 23 May, the halt order was issued by Generaloberst Gerd von Rundstedt, commander of Army Group A. Adolf Hitler approved this order the next day, and had the German High Command send confirmation to the front. Attacking the trapped BEF, French, and Belgian armies was left to the Luftwaffe until the order was rescinded on 26 May. This gave Allied forces time to construct defensive works and pull back large numbers of troops to fight the Battle of Dunkirk. From 28 to 31 May, in the siege of Lille, the remaining 40,000 men of the French First Army fought a delaying action against seven German divisions, including three armoured divisions.

On the first day, only 7,669 Allied soldiers were evacuated, but by the end of the eighth day, 338,226 had been rescued by a hastily assembled fleet of over 800 vessels. Many troops were able to embark from the harbour's protective mole onto 39 British Royal Navy destroyers, four Royal Canadian Navy destroyers, at least three French Navy destroyers, and a variety of civilian merchant ships. Others had to wade out from the beaches, waiting for hours in shoulder-deep water. Some were ferried to the larger ships by what became known as the Little Ships of Dunkirk, a flotilla of hundreds of merchant marine boats, fishing boats, pleasure craft, yachts, and lifeboats called into service from Britain.

The BEF lost 68,000 soldiers during the French campaign and had to abandon nearly all of its tanks, vehicles, and equipment. In his "We shall fight on the beaches" speech on 4 June to the House of Commons, British prime minister Winston Churchill called the event "a colossal military disaster", saying "the whole root and core and brain of the British Army" had been stranded at Dunkirk and seemed about to perish or be captured. He hailed their rescue as a "miracle of deliverance". Churchill also reminded the country that "we must be very careful not to assign to this deliverance the attributes of a victory. Wars are not won by evacuations."

== Background ==
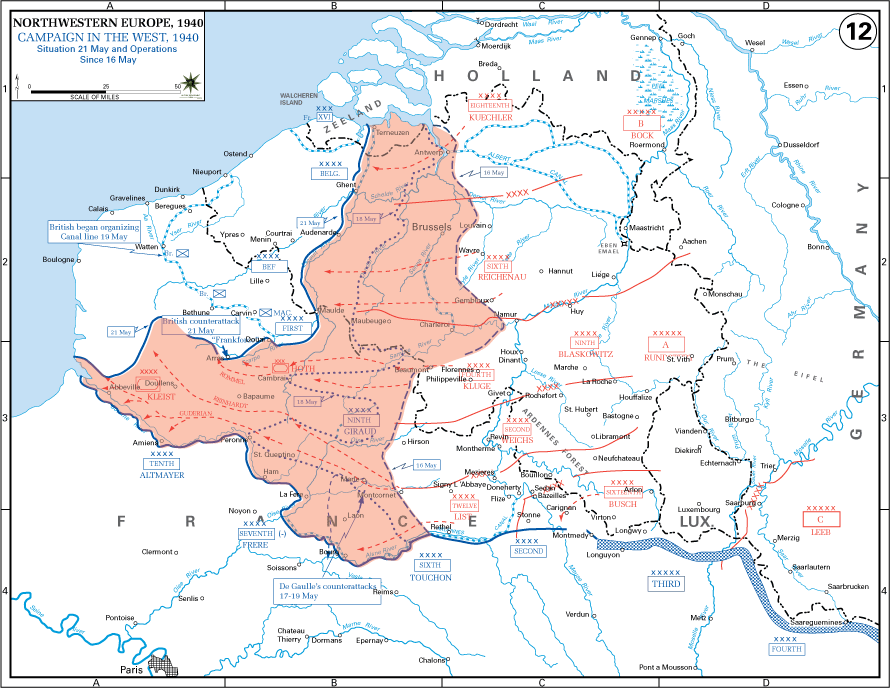
Situation on 21 May 1940; German forces occupy the area shaded in pink

In September 1939, after Germany invaded Poland, the United Kingdom sent the British Expeditionary Force (BEF) to aid in the defence of France, landing at Cherbourg, Nantes, and Saint-Nazaire. By May 1940 the force consisted of ten divisions in three corps under the command of General John Vereker, 6th Viscount Gort. Working with the BEF were the Belgian Army and the French First, Seventh, and Ninth Armies.

During the 1930s, the French had constructed the Maginot Line, a series of fortifications along their border with Germany. This line had been designed to deter a German invasion across the Franco-German border and funnel an attack into Belgium, which could then be met by the best divisions of the French Army. Thus, any future war would take place outside of French territory, avoiding a repeat of the First World War. The area immediately to the north of the Maginot Line was covered by the heavily wooded Ardennes region, which French General Philippe Pétain declared to be "impenetrable" as long as "special provisions" were taken. He believed that any enemy force emerging from the forest would be vulnerable to a pincer attack and destroyed. The French commander-in-chief, Maurice Gamelin, also believed the area to be of a limited threat, noting that it "never favoured large operations". With this in mind, the area was left lightly defended.

The initial plan for the German invasion of France called for an encirclement attack through the Netherlands and Belgium, avoiding the Maginot Line. Erich von Manstein, then Chief of Staff of the German Army Group A, prepared the outline of a different plan and submitted it to the Oberkommando des Heeres (OKH; German High Command) via his superior, Generaloberst Gerd von Rundstedt. Manstein's plan suggested that panzer divisions should attack through the Ardennes, then establish bridgeheads on the Meuse River and rapidly drive to the English Channel. The Germans would thus cut off the Allied armies in Belgium. This part of the plan later became known as the Sichelschnitt ("sickle cut"). Adolf Hitler approved a modified version of Manstein's ideas, today known as the Manstein Plan, after meeting with him on 17 February.

On 10 May, Germany invaded Belgium and the Netherlands. Army Group B, under Generaloberst Fedor von Bock, attacked into Belgium, while the three panzer corps of Army Group A under Rundstedt swung around to the south and drove for the Channel. The BEF advanced from the Belgian border to positions along the River Dyle within Belgium, where they fought elements of Army Group B starting on 10 May. They were ordered to begin a fighting withdrawal to the Scheldt River on 14 May when the Belgian and French positions on their flanks failed to hold. During a visit to Paris on 17 May, Winston Churchill was astonished to learn from Gamelin that the French had committed all their troops to the ongoing engagements and had no strategic reserves. On 19 May, Gort met with French General Gaston Billotte, commander of the French First Army and overall coordinator of the Allied forces. Billotte revealed that the French had no troops between the Germans and the sea. Gort immediately saw that evacuation across the Channel was the best course of action, and began planning a withdrawal to Dunkirk, the closest location with good port facilities. Surrounded by marshes, Dunkirk boasted old fortifications and the longest sand beach in Europe, where large groups could assemble. On 20 May, on Churchill's suggestion, the Admiralty began arranging for all available small vessels to be made ready to proceed to France. After continued engagements and a failed Allied attempt on 21 May at Arras to cut through the German spearhead, the BEF was trapped, along with the remains of the Belgian forces and the three French armies, in an area along the coast of northern France and Belgium.

== Prelude ==
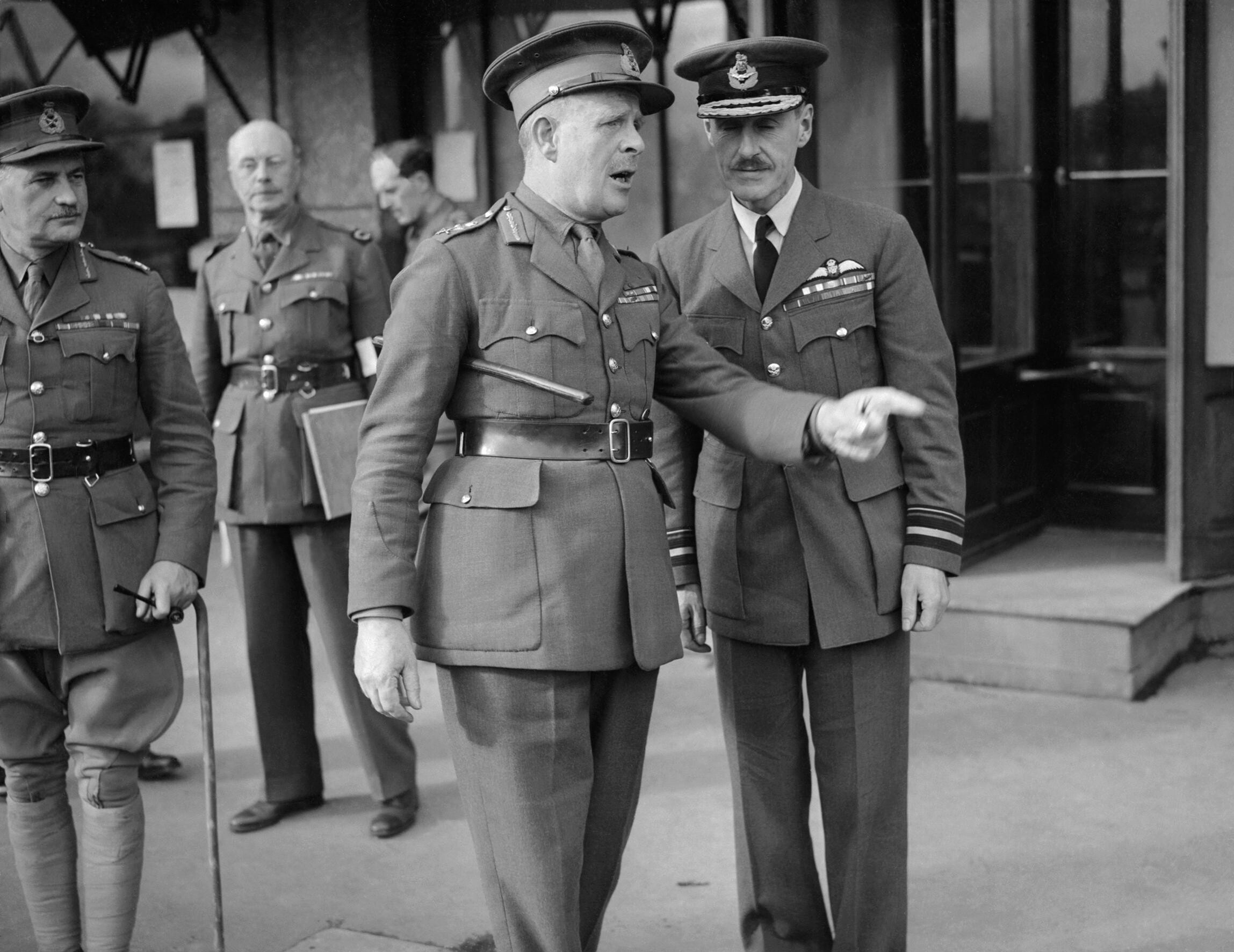
Lord Gort (gesturing, at centre) was commander of the British Expeditionary Force.

Without informing the French, the British began planning on 20 May for Operation Dynamo, the evacuation of the BEF. This planning was headed by Vice Admiral Bertram Ramsay at the naval headquarters below Dover Castle, from which he briefed Churchill as it was under way. Ships began gathering at Dover for the evacuation. On 20 May, the BEF sent Brigadier Gerald Whitfield to Dunkirk to start evacuating unnecessary personnel. Overwhelmed by what he later described as "a somewhat alarming movement towards Dunkirk by both officers and men", due to a shortage of food and water, he had to send many along without thoroughly checking their credentials. Even officers ordered to stay behind to aid the evacuation disappeared onto the boats.

On 22 May, Churchill ordered the BEF to attack southward in coordination with the French First Army under General Georges Blanchard to reconnect with the remainder of the French forces. This proposed action was dubbed the Weygand Plan after General Maxime Weygand, appointed Supreme Commander after Gamelin's dismissal on 18 May. On 25 May, Gort had to abandon any hope of achieving this objective and withdrew on his own initiative, along with Blanchard's forces, behind the Lys Canal, part of a canal system that reached the sea at Gravelines. Sluice gates had already been opened all along the canal to flood the system and create a barrier (the Canal Line) against the German advance.

=== Battle of Dunkirk ===
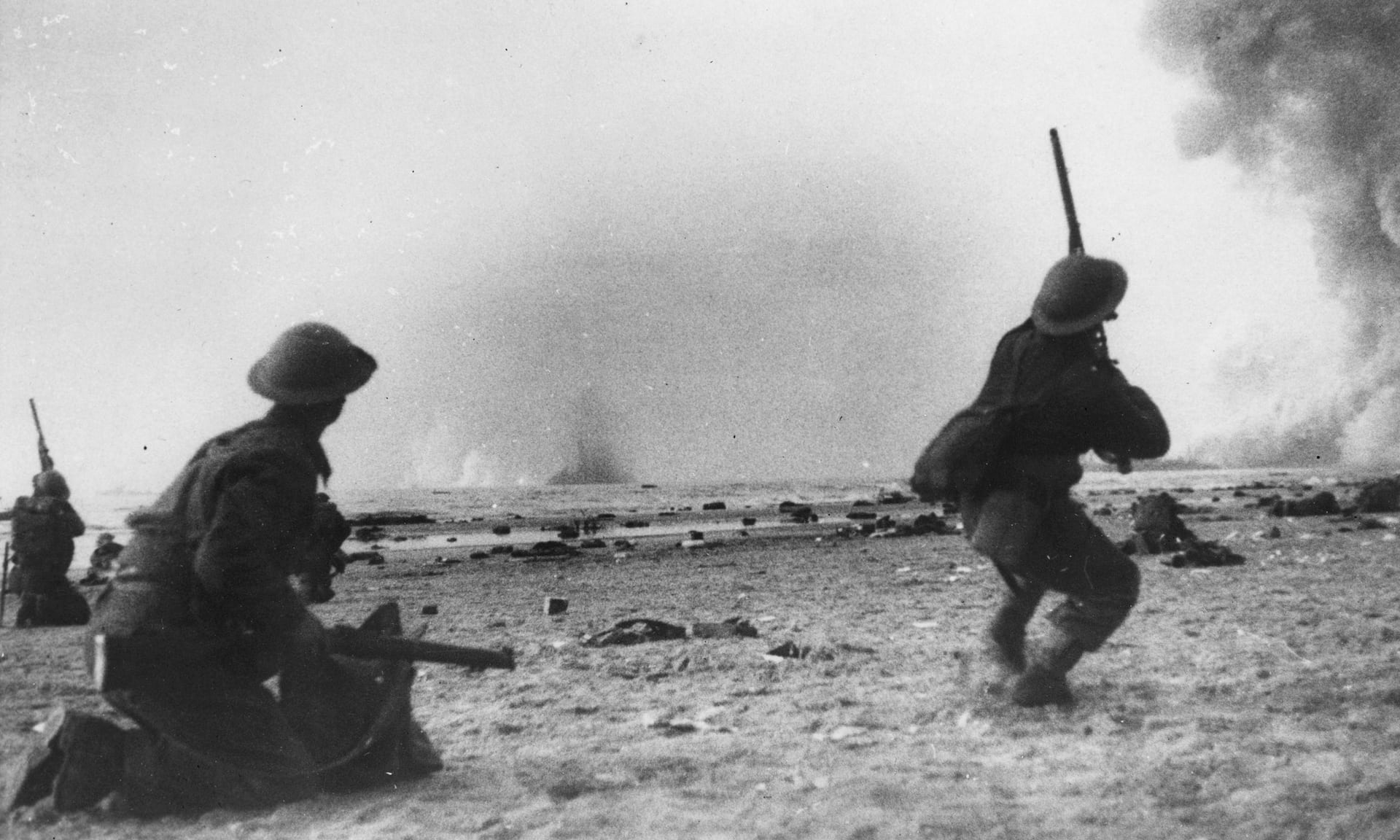
Soldiers were strafed and bombed by German aircraft while awaiting transport.

By 24 May, the Germans had captured the port of Boulogne and surrounded Calais. The engineers of the 2nd Panzer Division under Generalmajor Rudolf Veiel built five bridges over the Canal Line and only one British battalion barred the way to Dunkirk. On 23 May, at the suggestion of Fourth Army commander Generalfeldmarschall Günther von Kluge, Rundstedt had ordered the panzer units to halt, concerned about the vulnerability of his flanks and the question of supply to his forward troops. He was also concerned that the marshy ground around Dunkirk would prove unsuitable for tanks and he wished to conserve them for later operations (in some units, tank losses were 30–50 per cent). Hitler was also apprehensive, and on a visit to Army Group A headquarters on 24 May, he endorsed the order.

Air Marshal Hermann Göring urged Hitler to let the Luftwaffe, aided by Army Group B, finish off the British. However, General Franz Halder noted in his diary that the Luftwaffe was dependent upon the weather and aircrews were worn out after two weeks of battle. Rundstedt issued another order, which was sent uncoded. It was picked up by the Royal Air Force (RAF) Y service intelligence network at 12:42: "By order of the Fuhrer ... attack north-west of Arras is to be limited to the general line Lens–Bethune–Aire–St Omer–Gravelines. The Canal will not be crossed." Later that day, Hitler issued Directive 13, which called for the Luftwaffe to defeat the trapped Allied forces and stop their escape. At 15:30 on 26 May, Hitler ordered the panzer groups to continue their advance, but most units took another 16 hours to attack. Some accounts quote Hitler as saying he deliberately allowed the British to escape. The delay gave the Allies time to prepare defences vital for the evacuation and prevented the Germans from stopping the Allied retreat from Lille.

The halt order has been the subject of much discussion by historians. Guderian considered the failure to order a timely assault on Dunkirk to be one of the major German mistakes on the Western Front. Rundstedt called it "one of the great turning points of the war", and Manstein described it as "one of Hitler's most critical mistakes". B. H. Liddell Hart interviewed many of the generals after the war and put together a picture of Hitler's strategic thinking on the matter. He concluded that Hitler believed that once Britain's troops left continental Europe, they would never return.

== Evacuation ==
=== 26–27 May ===
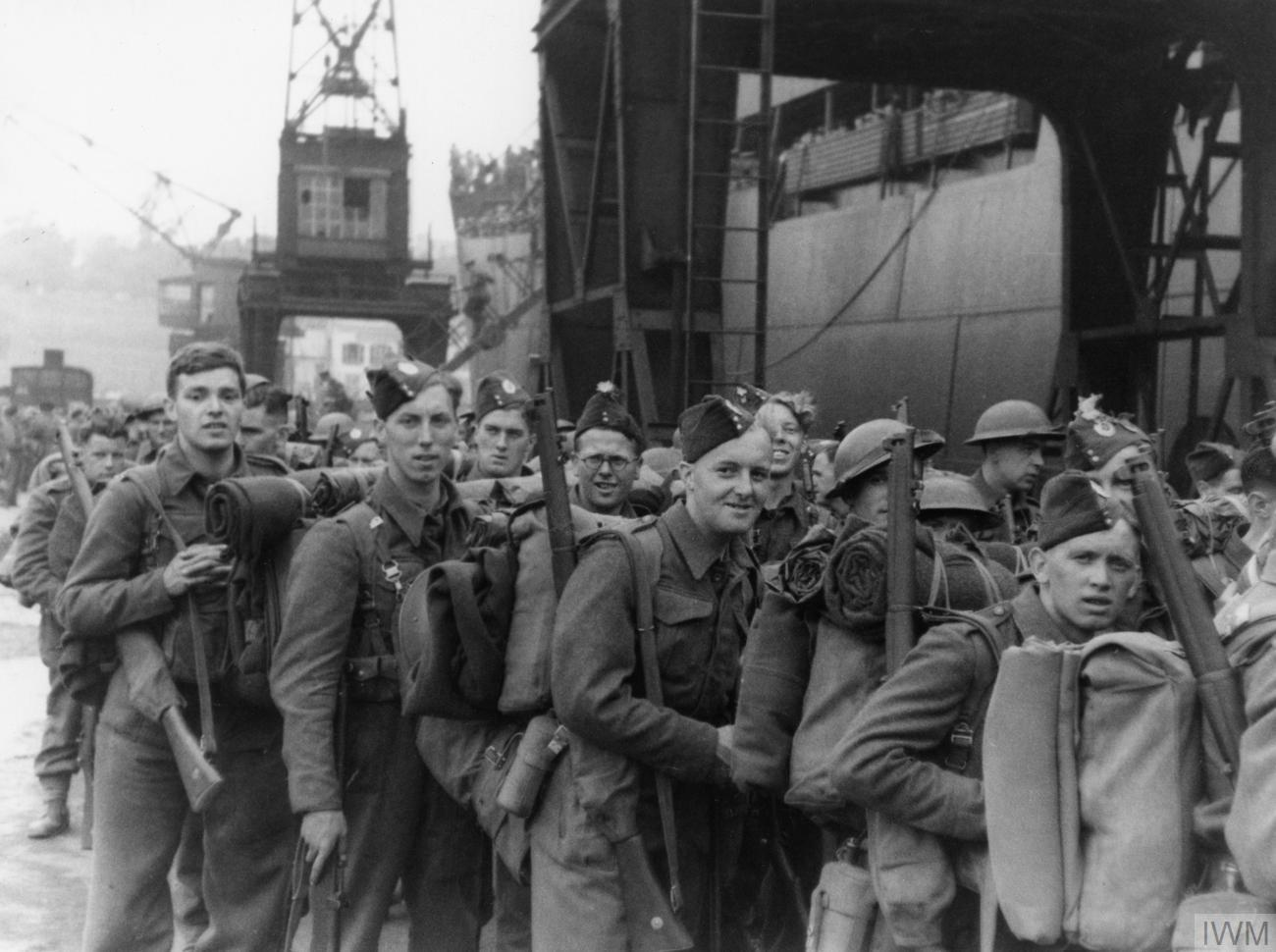
British troops during the evacuation from France

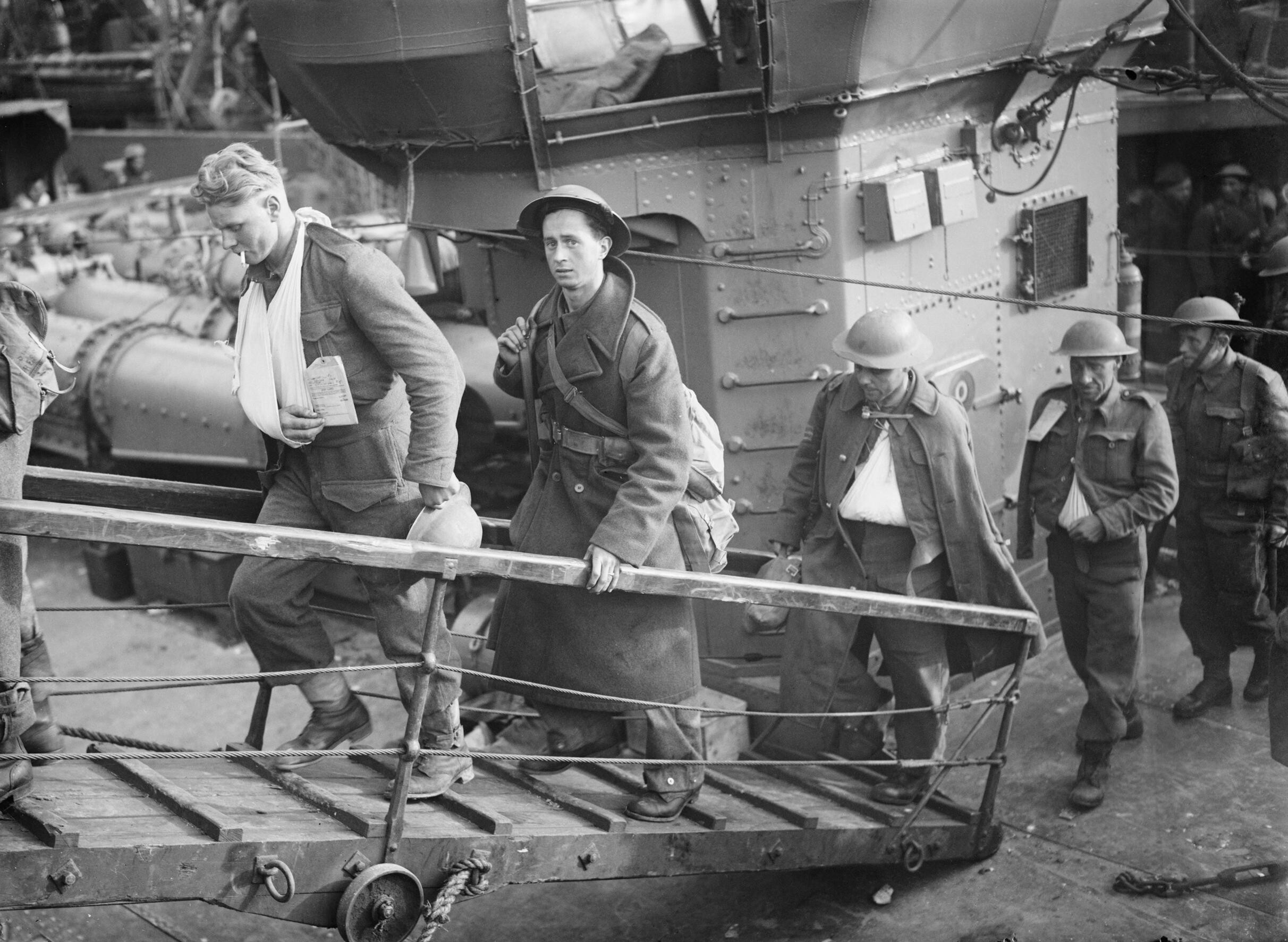
Troops evacuated from Dunkirk arrive at Dover, 31 May 1940

The retreat was undertaken amid chaotic conditions, with abandoned vehicles blocking the roads and a flood of refugees heading in the opposite direction. Due to wartime censorship and the desire to keep up British morale, the full extent of the unfolding disaster at Dunkirk was not initially publicised. A special service attended by King George VI was held in Westminster Abbey on 26 May, which was declared a national day of prayer. The Archbishop of Canterbury led prayers "for our soldiers in dire peril in France". Similar prayers were offered in synagogues and churches throughout the UK that day, confirming to the public their suspicion of the desperate plight of the troops. Just before 19:00 on 26 May, Churchill ordered Dynamo to begin, by which time 28,000 men had already departed. Initial plans called for the recovery of 45,000 men from the BEF within two days, at which time German troops were expected to block further evacuation. Only 25,000 men escaped during this period, including 7,669 on the first day.

On 27 May, the first full day of the evacuation, one cruiser, eight destroyers, and 26 other craft were active. Admiralty officers combed nearby boatyards for small craft that could ferry personnel from the beaches out to larger craft in the harbour, as well as larger vessels that could load from the docks. An emergency call was put out for additional help, and by 31 May nearly four hundred small craft were voluntarily and enthusiastically taking part in the effort.

The same day, the Luftwaffe heavily bombed Dunkirk, both the town and the dock installations. As the water supply was knocked out, the resulting fires could not be extinguished. An estimated one thousand civilians were killed, one-third of the remaining population of the town. RAF squadrons were ordered to provide air supremacy for the Royal Navy during evacuation. Their efforts shifted to covering Dunkirk and the English Channel, protecting the evacuation fleet. The Luftwaffe was met by 16 squadrons of the RAF, who claimed 38 kills on 27 May while losing 14 aircraft. Many more RAF fighters sustained damage and were subsequently written off. On the German side, Kampfgeschwader 2 (KG 2) and KG 3 suffered the heaviest casualties. German losses amounted to 23 Dornier Do 17s. KG 1 and KG 4 bombed the beach and harbour and KG 54 sank the 8,000-ton steamer Aden. Junkers Ju 87 Stuka dive bombers sank the troopship Cote d' Azur. The Luftwaffe engaged with 300 bombers which were protected by 550 fighter sorties and attacked Dunkirk in twelve raids. They dropped 15,000 high explosive and 30,000 incendiary bombs, destroying the oil tanks and wrecking the harbour. No. 11 Group RAF flew 22 patrols with 287 aircraft this day, in formations of up to 20 aircraft.

Altogether, over 3,500 sorties were flown in support of Operation Dynamo. The RAF continued to inflict a heavy toll on the German bombers throughout the week. Soldiers being bombed and strafed while awaiting transport were for the most part unaware of the efforts of the RAF to protect them, as most of the dogfights took place far from the beaches. As a result, many British soldiers bitterly accused the airmen of doing nothing to help, reportedly leading to some army troops accosting and insulting RAF personnel once they returned to England.

On 25 and 26 May, the Luftwaffe focused their attention on Allied pockets holding out at Calais, Lille, and Amiens, and did not attack Dunkirk. Calais, held by the BEF, surrendered on 26 May. Remnants of the French First Army, surrounded at Lille, fought off seven German divisions, several of them armoured, until 31 May, when the remaining 35,000 soldiers were forced to surrender after running out of food and ammunition. The Germans accorded the honours of war to the defenders of Lille in recognition of their bravery.

=== 28 May – 4 June ===
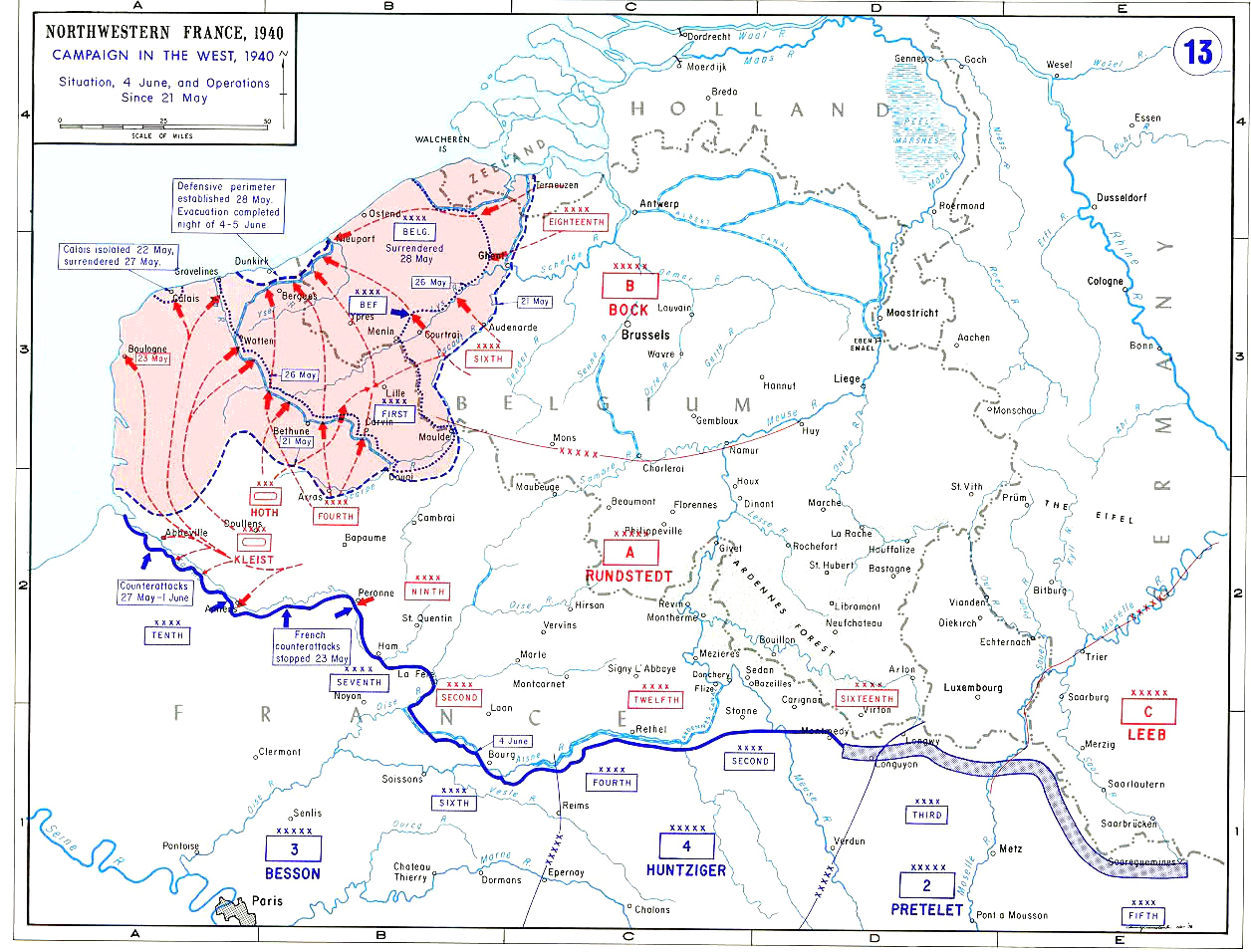
Situation on 4 June 1940; the remaining French rearguard held a sliver of land around Dunkirk

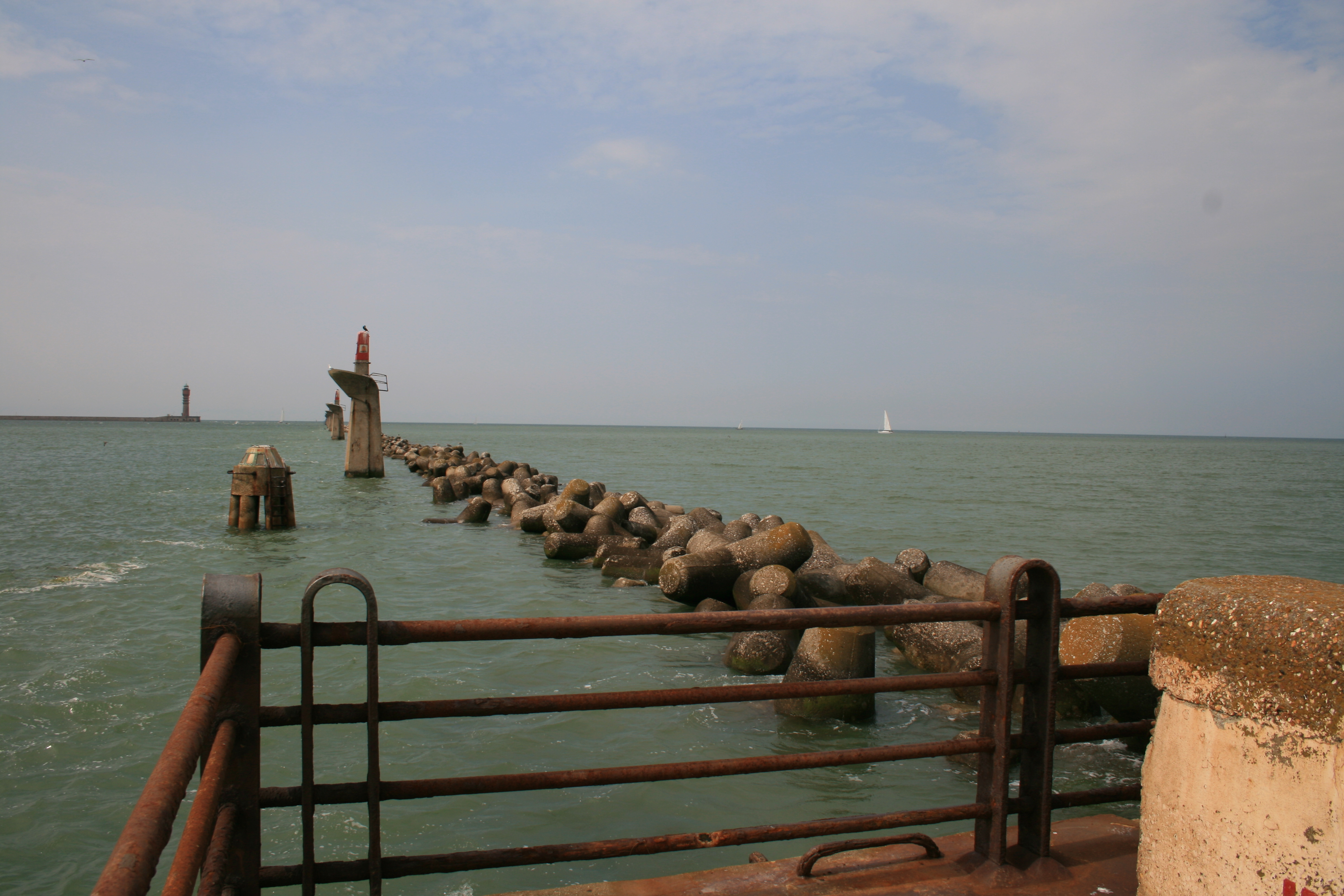
East mole (2009)

The Belgian Army surrendered on 28 May, leaving a large gap to the east of Dunkirk. Several British divisions were rushed in to cover that side. The Luftwaffe flew fewer sorties over Dunkirk on 28 May, switching their attention to the Belgian ports of Ostend and Nieuwpoort. The weather over Dunkirk was not conducive to dive or low-level bombing. The RAF flew 11 patrols and 321 sorties, claiming 23 destroyed for the loss of 13 aircraft. On 28 May, 17,804 soldiers arrived at British ports.

On 29 May, 47,310 British troops were rescued as the Luftwaffe's Ju 87s exacted a heavy toll on shipping. The British destroyer HMS Grenade was sunk and the French destroyer Mistral was crippled, while her sister ships, each laden with 500 men, were damaged by near misses. British destroyers Jaguar and Verity were badly damaged but escaped the harbour. Two trawlers disintegrated in the attack. Later, the passenger steamer SS Fenella sank with 600 men aboard at the pier but the men were able to get off. The paddle steamer HMS Crested Eagle suffered a direct hit, caught fire, and sank with severe casualties. The raiders also destroyed the two rail-owned ships, the SS Lorina and the SS Normannia. Of the five major German attacks, just two were contested by RAF fighters; the British lost 16 fighters in nine patrols. German losses amounted to 11 Ju 87s destroyed or damaged.

On 30 May, Churchill received word that all British divisions were now behind the defensive lines, along with more than half of the French First Army. By this time, the perimeter ran along a series of canals about 7 miles (11 km) from the coast, in marshy country not suitable for tanks. With the docks in the harbour rendered unusable by German air attacks, senior naval officer Captain (later Admiral) William Tennant initially ordered men to be evacuated from the beaches. When this proved too slow, he re-routed the evacuees to two long stone and concrete breakwaters, called the east and west moles, as well as the beaches. The moles were not designed to dock ships, but despite this, the majority of troops rescued from Dunkirk were taken off this way. Almost 200,000 troops embarked on ships from the east mole (which stretched nearly a mile out to sea) over the next week. James Campbell Clouston, pier master on the east mole, organised and regulated the flow of men along the mole into the waiting ships. Once more, low clouds kept Luftwaffe activity to a minimum. Nine RAF patrols were mounted, with no German formation encountered. The following day, the Luftwaffe sank one transport and damaged 12 others for 17 losses; the British claimed 38 kills, which is disputed. The RAF and Fleet Air Arm lost 28 aircraft.

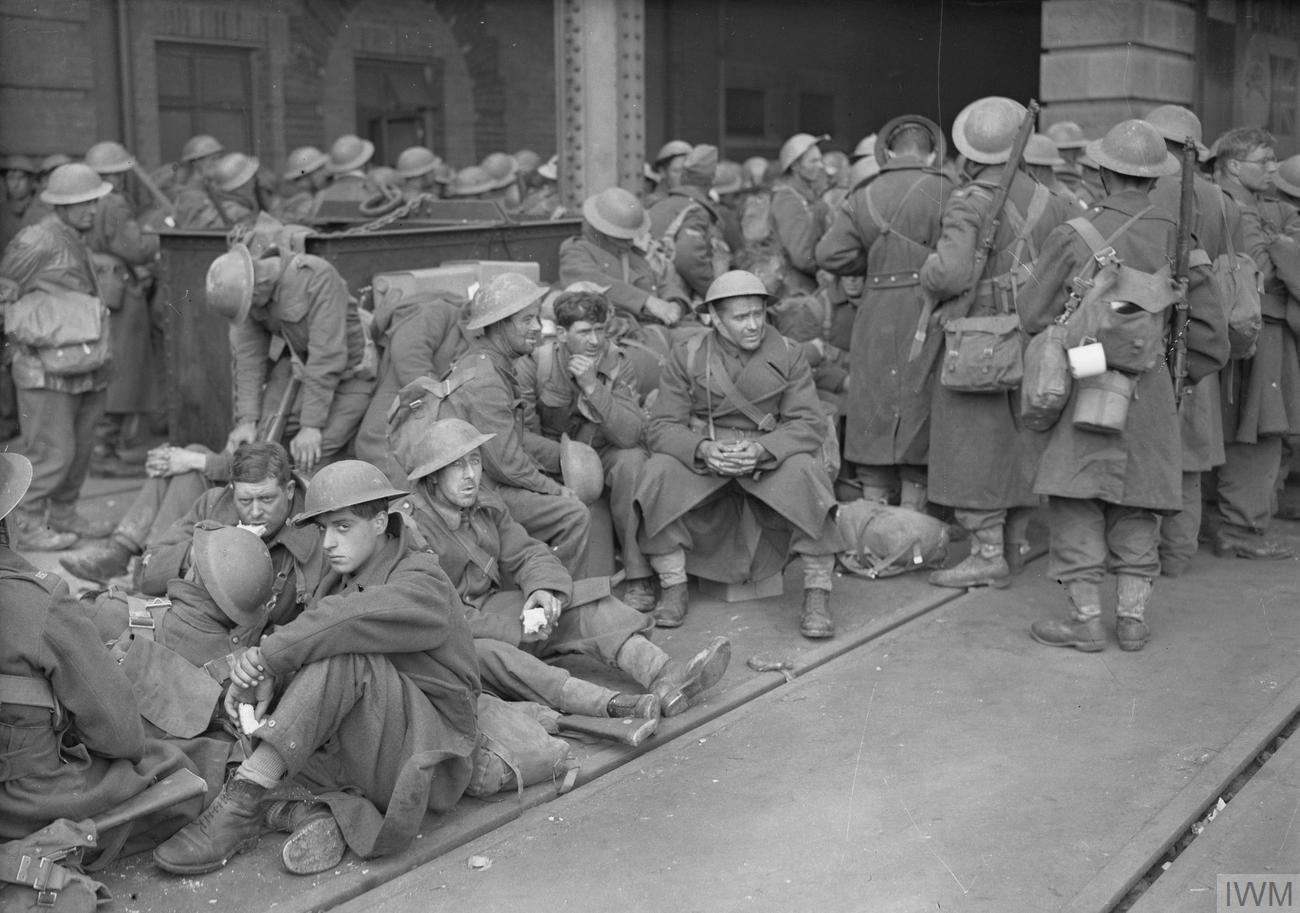
British troops evacuated from Dunkirk on 31 May 1940

The next day, an additional 53,823 men were embarked, including the first French soldiers. Lord Gort and 68,014 men were evacuated on 31 May, leaving Major-General Harold Alexander in command of the rearguard. A further 64,429 Allied soldiers departed on 1 June, before the increasing air attacks prevented further daylight evacuation. The British rearguard of 4,000 men left on the night of 2–3 June. An additional 75,000 French troops were retrieved over the nights of 2–4 June, before the operation finally ended. The remainder of the rearguard, 40,000 French troops, surrendered on 4 June.

Of the total 338,226 soldiers, several hundred were unarmed Indian mule handlers on detachment from the Royal Indian Army Service Corps, forming four of the six units of Force K-6 transport. Cypriot muleteers were also present. Three units were successfully evacuated and one captured. Also present at Dunkirk were a small number of French Senegalese soldiers and Moroccans.

== Navy ==
=== Evacuation routes ===
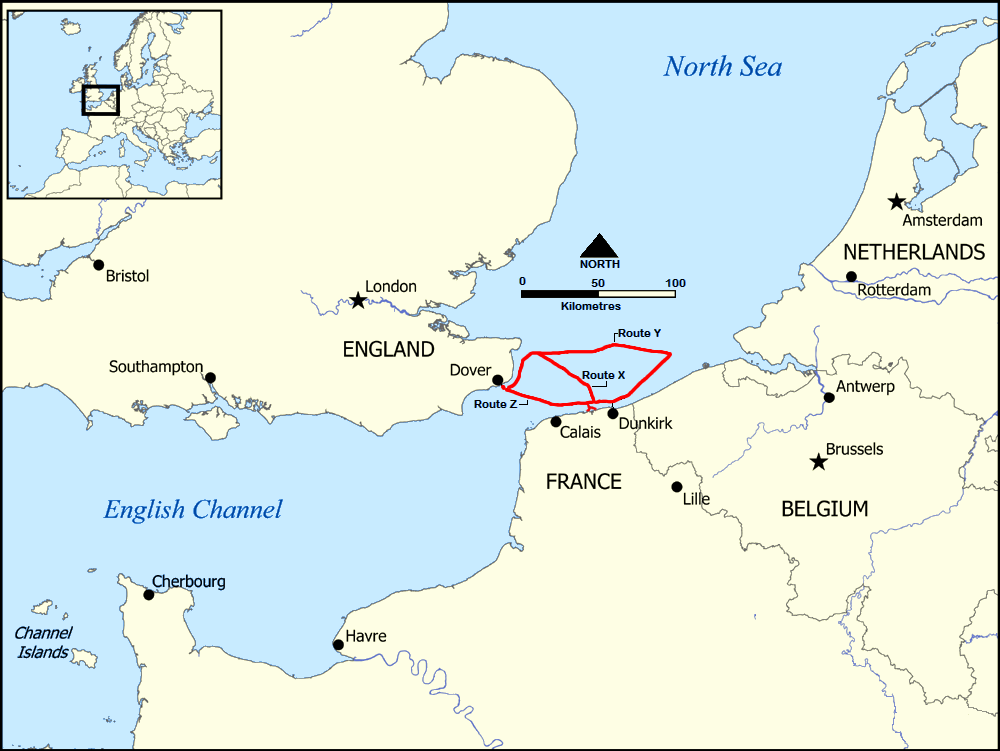
Map of the three evacuation routes

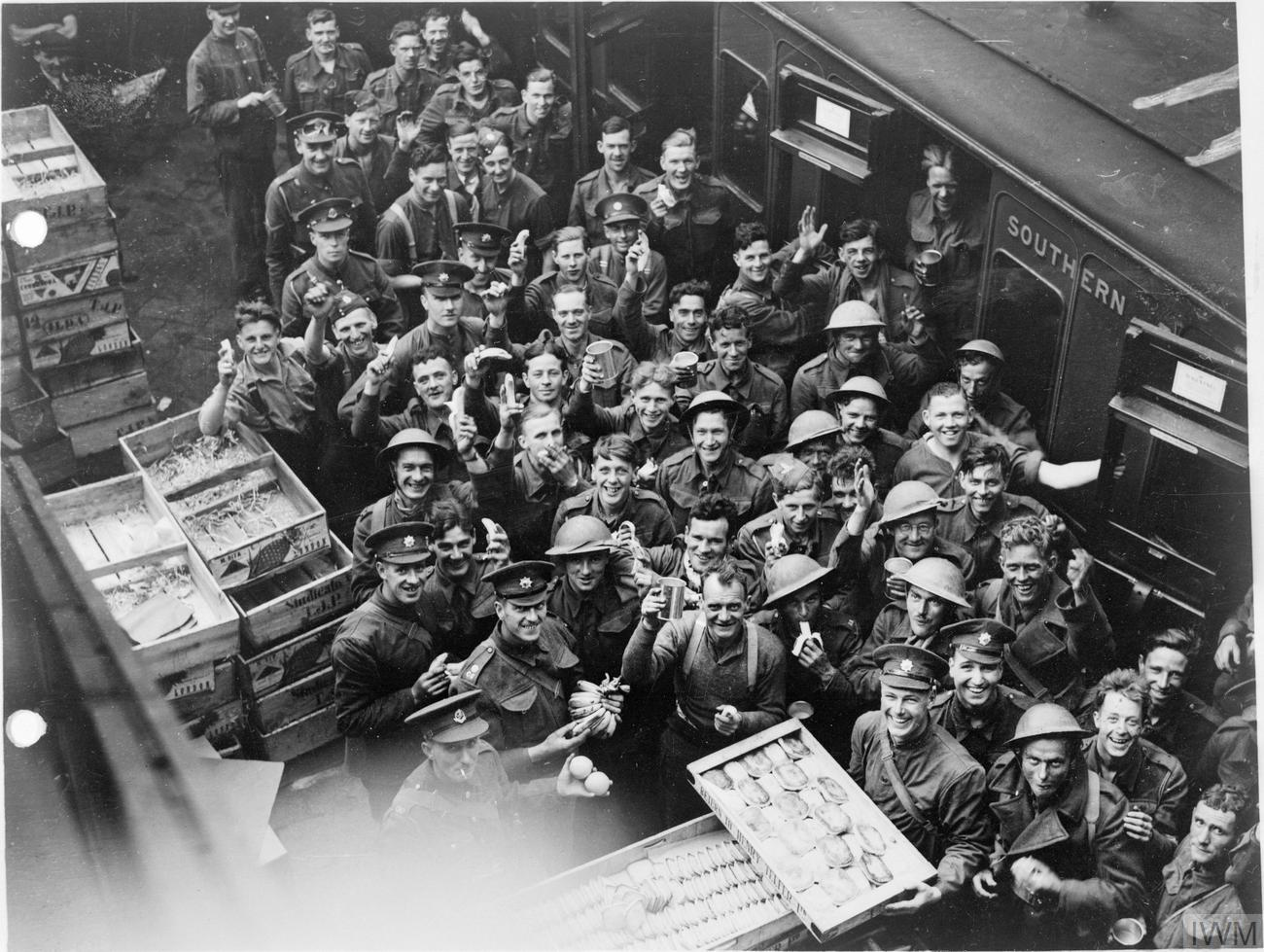
Evacuated troops enjoying tea and other refreshments before boarding a train at Dover Station, 26–29 May 1940

Three routes were allocated to the evacuating vessels. The shortest was Route Z, a distance of 39 nautical miles (72 km), but it entailed hugging the French coast and thus ships using it were subject to bombardment from on-shore batteries, particularly in daylight hours. Route X, although the safest from shore batteries, travelled through a particularly heavily mined portion of the Channel. Ships on this route travelled 55 nautical miles (102 km) north out of Dunkirk, proceeded through the Ruytingen Pass, and headed towards the North Goodwin Lightship before heading south around the Goodwin Sands to Dover. The route was safest from surface attacks, but the nearby minefields and sandbanks meant it could not be used at night. The longest of the three was Route Y, a distance of 87 nautical miles (161 km); using this route increased the sailing time to four hours, double the time required for Route Z. This route followed the French coast as far as Bray-Dunes, then turned north-east until reaching the Kwinte Buoy. Here, after making an approximately 135-degree turn, the ships sailed west to the North Goodwin Lightship and headed south around the Goodwin Sands to Dover. Ships on Route Y were the most likely to be attacked by German surface vessels, submarines, and the Luftwaffe.

You knew this was the chance to get home and you kept praying, please God, let us go, get us out, get us out of this mess back to England. To see that ship that came in to pick me and my brother up, it was a most fantastic sight. We saw dog fights up in the air, hoping nothing would happen to us and we saw one or two terrible sights. Then somebody said, there's Dover, that was when we saw the White Cliffs, the atmosphere was terrific. From hell to heaven was how the feeling was, you felt like a miracle had happened.

— Harry Garrett, British Army, speaking to Kent Online

=== Ships ===
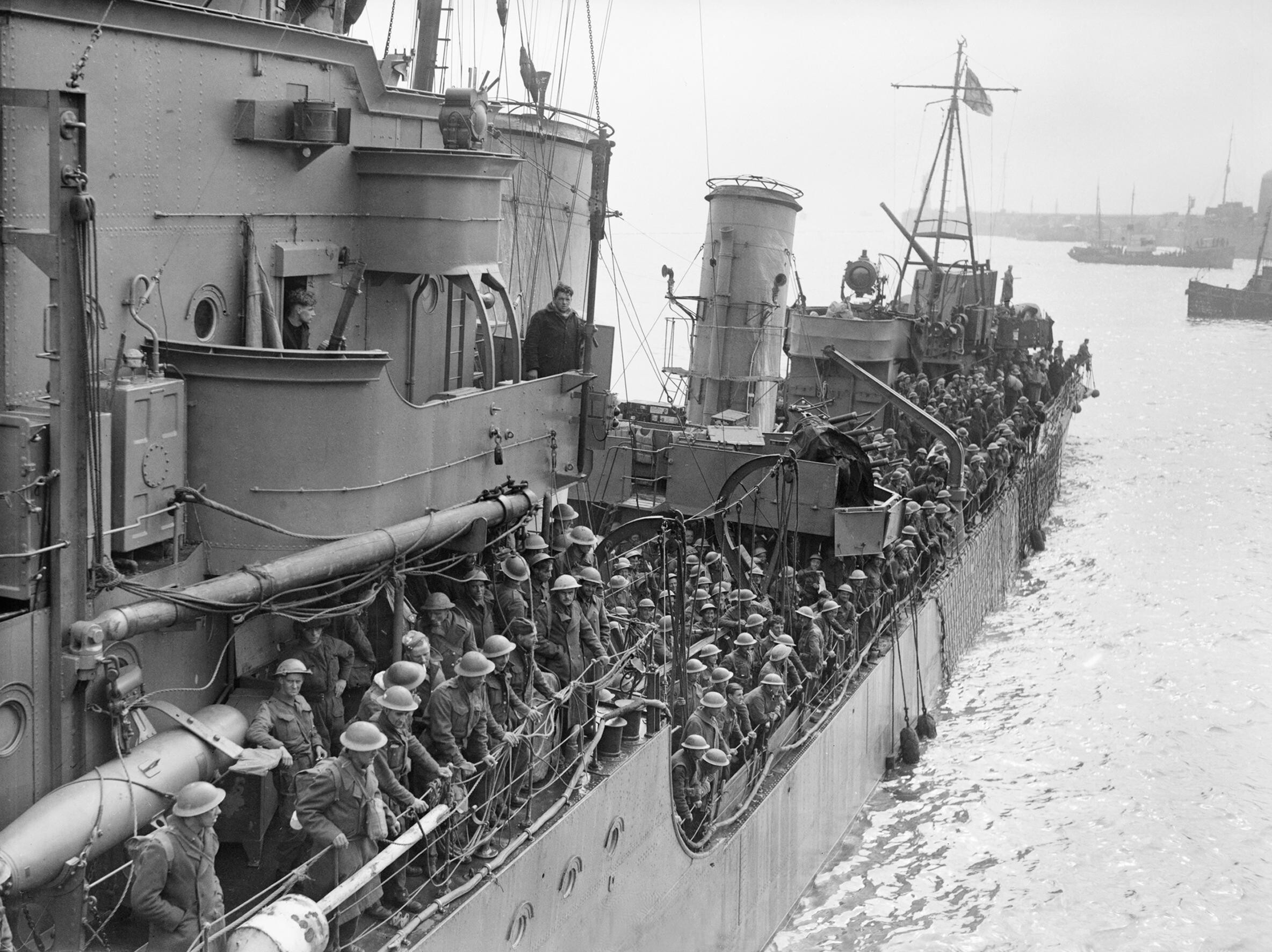
Troops evacuated from Dunkirk on a destroyer about to berth at Dover, 31 May 1940

The Royal Navy provided the anti-aircraft cruiser HMS Calcutta, 39 destroyers, and many other craft. The Merchant Navy supplied passenger ferries, hospital ships, and other vessels. Britain's Belgian, Dutch, Canadian, Polish, and French allies provided vessels as well. Admiral Ramsay arranged for around a thousand copies to be made of the required charts, had buoys laid around the Goodwin Sands and down to Dunkirk, and organised the flow of shipping. Larger ships such as destroyers were able to carry about 900 men per trip. The soldiers mostly travelled on the upper decks for fear of being trapped below if the ship sank. After the loss on 29 May of 19 British and French navy ships plus three of the larger requisitioned vessels, the Admiralty withdrew their eight best destroyers for the future defence of the country.

British ships
Type of vessel	Total engaged	Sunk	Damaged
Cruisers	1	0	1
Destroyers	39	6	19
Sloops, corvettes and gunboats	9	1	1
Minesweepers	36	5	7
Trawlers and drifters	113	17	2
Special service vessels	3	1	0
Ocean boarding vessels	3	1	1
Torpedo boats and anti-submarine boats	13	0	0
Former Dutch schuyts with naval crews	40	4	Unknown
Yachts with naval crews	26	3	Unknown
Personnel ships	45	8	8
Hospital carriers	8	1	5
Naval motor boats	12	6	Unknown
Tugboats	34	3	Unknown
Other small craft (Note: Does not include ships' lifeboats and some unrecorded small privately owned craft.)	311	170	Unknown
Total British ships	693	226	

Allied ships
Type of vessel	Total engaged	Sunk	Damaged
Warships (all types)	49	8	Unknown
Other vessels	119	9	Unknown
Total Allied ships	168	17	Unknown
Grand total	861	243	Unknown

=== Little ships ===
A wide variety of small vessels from all over the south of England were pressed into service to aid in the Dunkirk evacuation. They included speedboats, Thames vessels, car ferries, pleasure craft, and many other types of small craft. The most useful proved to be the motor lifeboats, which had a reasonably good capacity and speed. Some boats were requisitioned without the owner's knowledge or consent. Agents of the Ministry of Shipping, accompanied by a naval officer, scoured the Thames for likely vessels, had them checked for seaworthiness, and took them downriver to Sheerness, where naval crews were to be placed aboard. Due to shortages of personnel, many small craft crossed the Channel with civilian crews.

The first of the "little ships" arrived at Dunkirk on 28 May. The wide sand beaches meant that large vessels could not get anywhere near the shore, and even small craft had to stop about 100 yards (91 m) from the waterline and wait for the soldiers to wade out. In many cases, personnel would abandon their boat upon reaching a larger ship, and subsequent evacuees had to wait for boats to drift ashore with the tide before they could make use of them. In most areas on the beaches, soldiers queued up with their units and patiently awaited their turn to leave. But at times, panicky soldiers had to be warned off at gunpoint when they attempted to rush to the boats out of turn. In addition to ferrying out on boats, soldiers at De Panne in Belgium and Bray-Dunes constructed improvised jetties by driving rows of abandoned vehicles onto the beach at low tide, anchoring them with sandbags, and connecting them with wooden walkways.

== Aftermath ==
=== Analysis ===
Troops landed from Dunkirk 27 May – 4 June 1940
Date	Beaches	Harbour	Total
27 May	—	7,669	7,669
28 May	5,930	11,874	17,804
29 May	13,752	33,558	47,310
30 May	29,512	24,311	53,823
31 May	22,942	45,072	68,014
1 June	17,348	47,081	64,429
2 June	6,695	19,561	26,256
3 June	1,870	24,876	26,746
4 June	622	25,553	26,175
Totals	98,671	239,555	338,226

Before the operation was completed, the prognosis had been gloomy, with Churchill warning the House of Commons on 28 May to expect "hard and heavy tidings". Subsequently, Churchill referred to the outcome as a miracle, and the British press presented the evacuation as a "disaster turned to triumph" so successfully that Churchill had to remind the country in a speech to the House of Commons on 4 June that "we must be very careful not to assign to this deliverance the attributes of a victory. Wars are not won by evacuations." Andrew Roberts comments that the confusion over the Dunkirk evacuation is illustrated by two of the best books on it being called Strange Defeat and Strange Victory.

The 51st (Highland) Infantry Division was cut off south of the Somme, by the German "race to the sea", in addition to the 1st Armoured Division and a host of logistical and labour troops. Some of the latter had been formed into the improvised Beauman Division. At the end of May, further elements of two divisions began deploying to France with the hope of establishing a Second BEF. The majority of the 51st (Highland) Infantry Division was forced to surrender on 12 June at Saint-Valery-en-Caux. However, almost 192,000 Allied personnel, including 144,000 British, were evacuated through various French ports from 15 to 25 June under the codename Operation Aerial. Remaining British forces under the French Tenth Army as Norman Force retreated towards Cherbourg. The Germans marched into Paris on 14 June and France surrendered eight days later.

The more than 100,000 French troops evacuated from Dunkirk were quickly and efficiently shuttled to camps in various parts of south-western England, where they were temporarily lodged before being repatriated. British ships ferried French troops to Brest, Cherbourg, and other ports in Normandy and Brittany, although only about half of the repatriated troops were redeployed against the Germans before the surrender of France. For many French soldiers, the Dunkirk evacuation represented only a few weeks' delay before being killed or captured by the German army after their return to France. Of the French soldiers evacuated from France in June 1940, about 3,000 joined Charles de Gaulle's Free French army in Britain.

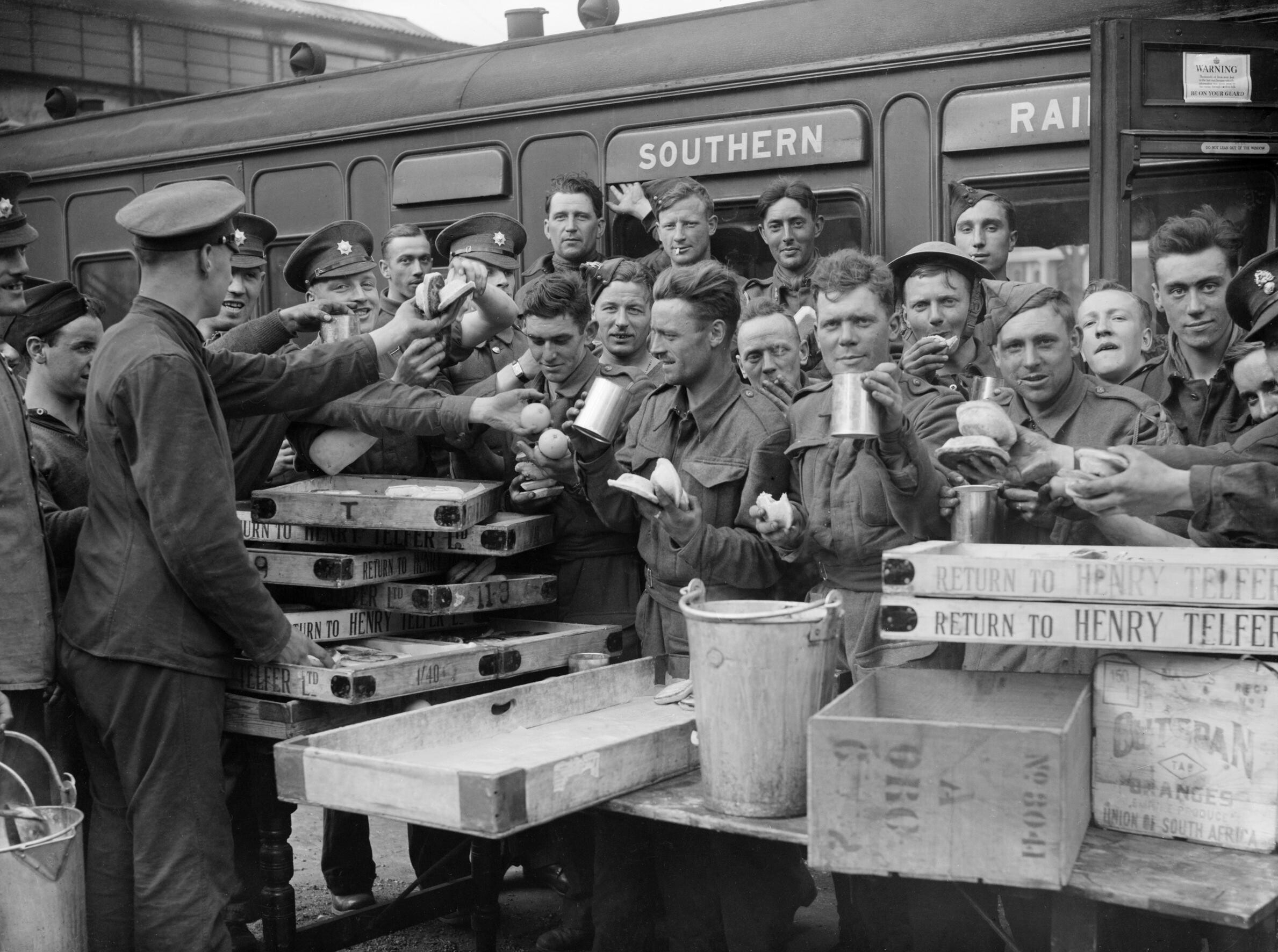
Troops evacuated from Dunkirk in London, 31 May 1940

In France, the unilateral British decision to evacuate through Dunkirk rather than counter-attack to the south, and the perceived preference of the Royal Navy for evacuating British forces at the expense of the French, led to some bitter resentment. According to Churchill, French Admiral François Darlan originally ordered that the British forces should receive preference, but on 31 May, he intervened at a meeting in Paris to order that the evacuation should proceed on equal terms and that the British would form the rearguard. In fact, the 35,000 men who finally surrendered after covering the final evacuations were mostly French soldiers of the 2nd Light Mechanized and the 68th Infantry Divisions. Their resistance allowed the evacuation effort to be extended to 4 June, on which date another 26,175 Frenchmen were transported to England.

The evacuation was presented to the German public as an overwhelming and decisive German victory. On 5 June 1940, Hitler stated, "Dunkirk has fallen! 40,000 French and English troops are all that remains of the formerly great armies. Immeasurable quantities of materiel have been captured. The greatest battle in the history of the world has come to an end." (Note: Original German: "Dünkirchen ist gefallen! 40 000 Franzosen und Engländer sind als letzter Rest einstiger großer Armeen gefangen. Unübersehbares Material wurde erbeutet. Damit ist die größte Schlacht der Weltgeschichte beendet.") Oberkommando der Wehrmacht (the German armed forces high command) announced the event as "the greatest annihilation battle of all time".

Within Britain, there was a sharp ideological division about the portrayal of the Dunkirk evacuation. Left-wing and liberal accounts at the time such as by the writer J. B. Priestley and the journalist Hilda Marchant tended to focus exclusively upon Dunkirk, which was portrayed as the beginning of the "people's war", where ordinary people rallied to save the BEF. By contrast, Conservative accounts at the time portrayed Dunkirk as merely one part of a wider "battle of the ports" which also included the battle of Boulogne and the siege of Calais. Conservative accounts of the "battle of the ports" tended to focus on the professionalism and the bravery of the British military, especially the British Army, in desperate conditions, which were portrayed as symbols of British martial prowess. Conservative newspapers and journals in early 1940 tended to give more coverage to the battle of Calais, where Brigadier Claude Nicholson chose to fight on despite being informed that escape was impossible from Calais, rather than the Dunkirk evacuation. The triumph of the "people's war" interpretation, which completely obliviated the rival "battle of the ports" interpretation in the popular memory of 1940, was largely due to cinema, as filmmakers chose to focus on the evacuation at Dunkirk and ignored the other battles along the French coast.

=== Casualties ===
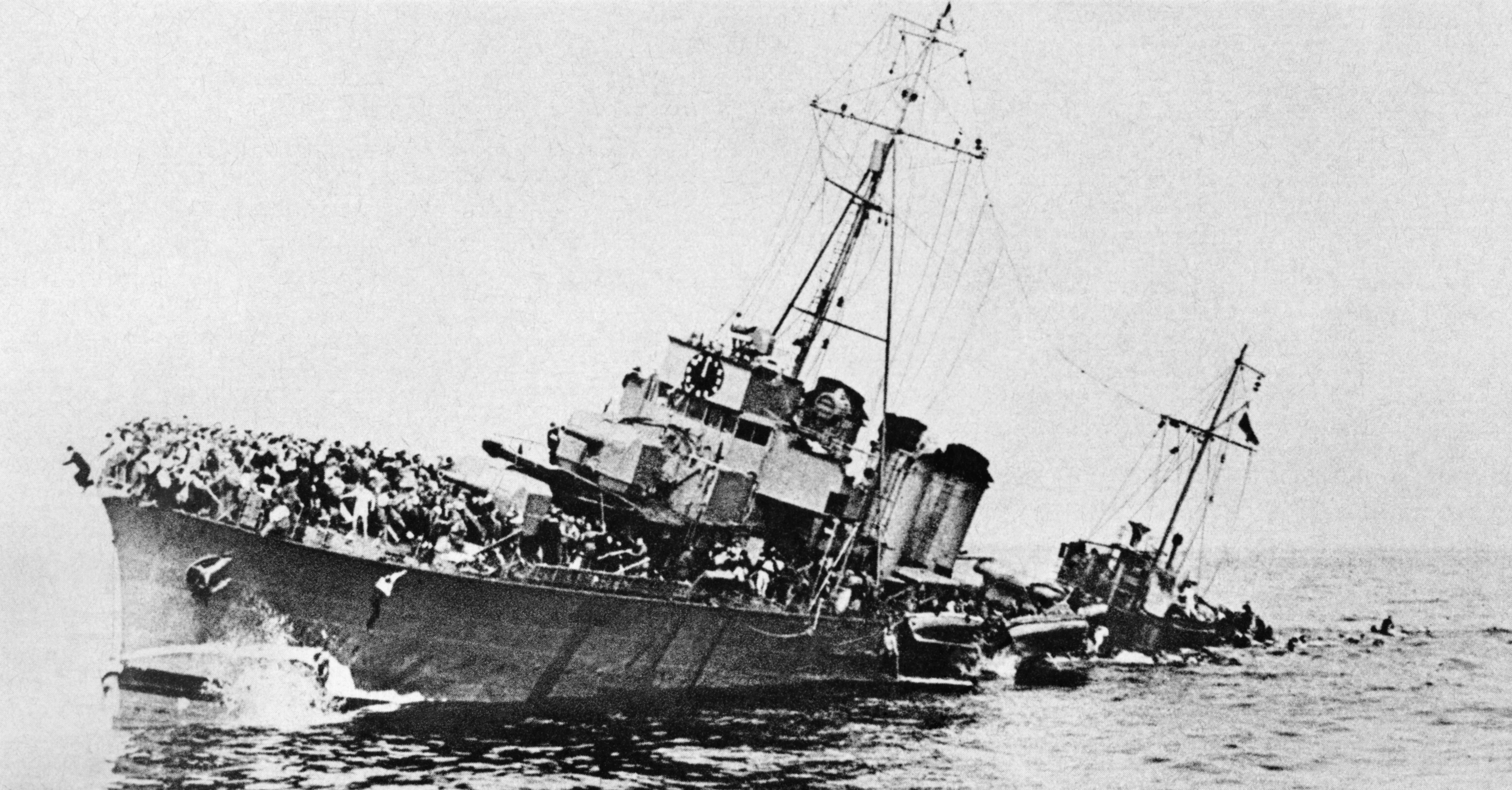
Bourrasque slowly sinking

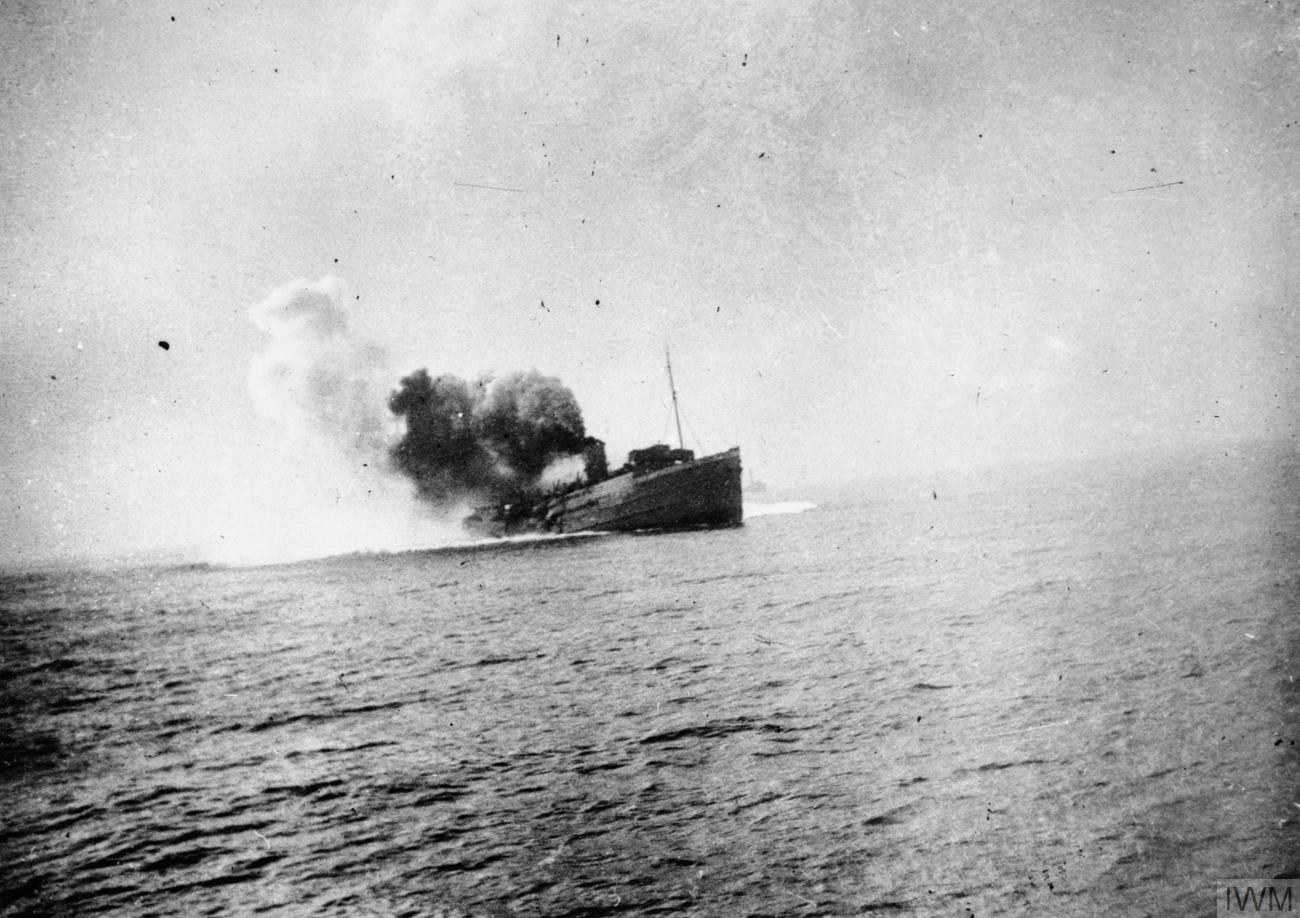
Isle of Man Steam Packet Company vessel Mona's Queen shortly after striking a mine on the approach to Dunkirk, 29 May 1940

During the entire campaign, from 10 May until the armistice with France on 22 June, the BEF suffered 68,000 casualties. This included 3,500 killed and 13,053 wounded. Most heavy equipment had to be abandoned during the various evacuations, resulting in the loss of 2,472 pieces of artillery, 20,000 motorcycles, nearly 65,000 other vehicles, 416,000 long tons (423,000 t) of stores, more than 75,000 long tons (76,000 t) of ammunition, and 162,000 long tons (165,000 t) of fuel. Almost all of the 445 British tanks despatched to France were abandoned.

Six British and three French destroyers were sunk, along with nine other major vessels. In addition, 19 destroyers were damaged. Over 200 British and Allied sea craft were sunk, with a similar number damaged. The Royal Navy's most significant losses in the operation were six destroyers:

- Grafton, hit by a torpedo from German U-boat U62, scuttled by naval gunfire from HMS Ivanhoe (D16) on 29 May
- Grenade, sunk by air attack at Dunkirk on 29 May
- Wakeful, sunk by a torpedo from the E-boat S-30 on 29 May
- Basilisk, Havant, and Keith, sunk by air attack off the beaches on 1 June

The French Navy lost three destroyers:

- Bourrasque, mined off Nieuport on 30 May
- Siroco, sunk by the E-boats S-23 and S-26 on 31 May
- Le Foudroyant, sunk by air attack off the beaches on 1 June

The RAF lost 145 aircraft, of which at least 42 were Spitfires, while the Luftwaffe lost 156 aircraft in operations during the nine days of Operation Dynamo, including 35 destroyed by Royal Navy ships (plus 21 damaged) during the six days from 27 May to 1 June.

For every seven soldiers who escaped through Dunkirk, one man became a prisoner of war. The majority of these prisoners were sent on forced marches into Germany. Prisoners reported brutal treatment by their guards, including beatings, starvation, and murder. Another complaint was that German guards kicked over buckets of water that had been left at the roadside by French civilians, for the marching prisoners to drink.

Many of the prisoners were marched to the city of Trier, with the march taking as long as 20 days. Others were marched to the river Scheldt and were sent by barge to the Ruhr. The prisoners were then sent by rail to prisoner of war camps in Germany. The majority (those below the rank of corporal) then worked in German industry and agriculture for the remainder of the war.

The 4,504 men of the BEF who died in the fighting of 1940, or as a prisoner of war following capture during this campaign, and have no known grave are commemorated on the Dunkirk Memorial.

== Dunkirk Jack ==
Dunkirk Jack

The St George's Cross defaced with the arms of Dunkirk is the warranted house flag of the Association of Dunkirk Little Ships. It is known as the Dunkirk Jack. The flag may be flown from the jack staff only by civilian vessels that took part in the Dunkirk rescue operation.

== Portrayals ==
=== Films ===
- Mrs. Miniver (1942)
- Dunkirk (1958)
- Weekend at Dunkirk (1964)
- Atonement (2007)
- Dunkirk (2017)
- Darkest Hour (2017)

=== Television ===
- Dunkirk (2004)

=== Books ===
- The Snow Goose: A Story of Dunkirk, a novella by Paul Gallico

== See also ==
- 1940 Dunkirk Veterans' Association
- Dunkirk Medal

== Bibliography ==
- "The Association of Dunkirk Little Ships". The Association of Dunkirk Little Ships. 2010. Archived from the original on 11 September 2019.
- Atkin, Ronald (1990). Pillar of Fire: Dunkirk 1940. London: Sidgwick & Jackson. ISBN 0-283-99697-8.
- Bajwa, Mandeep Singh (19 May 2013). "Force K6: Indian troops in France". Hindustan Times.
- Blaxland, Gregory (1973). Destination Dunkirk: The story of Gort's Army. London: William Kimber. ISBN 978-0-7183-0203-0.
- Bowman, Ghee (2020). The Indian Contingent: The Forgotten Muslim Soldiers of Dunkirk. Cheltenham: History Press. ISBN 978-0-7509-9379-1.
- Chessum, Victoria (9 June 2014). "Harry Garrett, 96, tells of the moment the White Cliffs of Dover came into sight after the war". Kent Online.
- Churchill, Winston (1949). Their Finest Hour. The Second World War. Vol. II. Boston; Toronto: Houghton Mifflin. OCLC 396145.
- Churchill, Winston (2003). "Wars are not won by evacuations, 4 June 1940, House of Commons". In Churchill, Winston S. (ed.). Never Give In!: The Best of Winston Churchill's Speeches. New York: Hyperion. ISBN 1-40130-056-1.
- Cooper, Matthew (1978). The German Army 1933–1945, Its Political and Military Failure. Mazal Holocaust Collection. Briarcliff Manor, NY: Stein and Day. ISBN 0-8128-2468-7.
- Costello, John (1991). Ten Days That Saved the West. London; New York: Bantam. ISBN 978-0-593-01919-1.
- Dildy, Douglas C. (2010). Dunkirk 1940: Operation Dynamo. Oxford: Osprey. ISBN 978-1-84603-457-2.
- "The Royal Indian Army Service Corps". Dunkirk 1940: The Before, the Reality, the Aftermath. Dunkirk 1940.org.
- "Dunkirk Memorial". Commonwealth War Graves Commission.
- Ellis, Major L. F. (2004) [1954]. Butler, J. R. M. (ed.). The War in France and Flanders 1939–1940. History of the Second World War United Kingdom Military Series. Naval & Military Press. ISBN 978-1-84574-056-6.
- English, John (1993). Amazon to Ivanhoe: British Standard Destroyers of the 1930s. Kendal, England: World Ship Society. ISBN 0-905617-64-9.
- Fermer, Douglas (2013). Three German Invasions of France: The Summer Campaigns of 1870, 1914, and 1940. Barnsley: Pen & Sword Military. ISBN 978-1-78159-354-7.
- Forczyk, Robert (2010). Manstein: Leadership – Strategy – Conflict. Oxford: Osprey. ISBN 978-1-84603-221-9.
- French, David (2002) [2000]. Raising Churchill's Army: The British Army and the War against Germany 1919–1945. New York: Oxford University Press. ISBN 978-0-19-154253-4.
- [Friends of the ORP Błyskawica Society]. "Błyskawica: A Brief History of the Ship". www.blyskawica-cowes.org.uk. Friends of the ORP Błyskawica Society.
- Gardner, W. J. R. (1949). "The Evacuation from Dunkirk: 'Operation Dynamo' 26 May – 4 June 1940". Whitehall Histories. Naval Staff Histories. London: Routledge. ISSN 1471-0757.
- Gelb, Norman (1990). Dunkirk: The Incredible Escape. London: Michael Joseph. ISBN 0-7181-3203-3.
- Gojkovic, Maria (6 August 2017). "Cypriots among the forgotten troops of Dunkirk". Cyprus Beat. Archived from the original on 21 January 2020.
- "Größte Vernichtungschlacht aller Zeiten". Fehrbelliner Zeitung (in German). 5 June 1940.
- Guderian, Heinz (2001) [1952]. "Hitler's Momentous Order to Stop". Panzer Leader. New York: Da Capo Press. ISBN 978-0-306-81101-2.
- Hart, B. H. Liddell (1948). The German Generals Talk. New York: William Morrow. LCCN 48004499.
- Hinsley, F. H. (1994) [1993]. British Intelligence in the Second World War: Its Influence on Strategy and Operations. History of the Second World War (abr.) (2nd rev. ed.). London: HMSO. ISBN 0-11-630961-X.
- Hitler, Adolf (5 June 1940). "Tagesbefehl des Fuehrers". Teltower Kreisblatt (in German).
- Holmes, Richard, ed. (2001). "Dunkirk evacuation". The Oxford Companion to Military History. New York: Oxford University Press. ISBN 0-19-866209-2.
- Jackson, Julian (2003). The Fall of France: The Nazi Invasion of 1940. Oxford: Oxford University Press. ISBN 978-0-192-80550-8.
- Jackson, Robert (1974). Air War Over France, 1939–1940. London: Ian Allan. ISBN 0-7110-0510-9.
- Jodl, Alfred, OKW Diary (section 25), vol. 40
- Kaufmann, J. E.; Kaufmann, H. W. (2007). Fortress France: The Maginot Line and French Defenses in World War II. Stackpole Military History Series. Mechanicsburg, PA: Stackpole. ISBN 978-0-811-73395-3.
- Keegan, John (1989). The Second World War. New York: Viking. ISBN 0-670-82359-7.
- Kowol, Kit (2024). Blue Jerusalem British Conservatism, Winston Churchill, and the Second World War. Oxford: Oxford University Press. ISBN 978-0-19-263900-4.
- Kilzer, Louis C. (2000). Hitler's Traitor: Martin Bormann and the Defeat of the Reich. Presidio Press. ISBN 978-0-89141-710-1.
- Lemay, Benoît (2010). Erich von Manstein: Hitler's Master Strategist. Heyward, Pierce (trans.). Havertown, PA; Newbury, Berkshire: Casemate. ISBN 978-1-935149-26-2.
- Liddell Hart, B. H. (1999) [1970]. History of the Second World War. New York: Da Capo Press. ISBN 0-306-80912-5.
- Longden, Sean (2009). Dunkirk: The Men They Left Behind. London: Constable and Robinson. ISBN 978-1-84529-977-4.
- Longden, Sean (2005). Hitler's British Slaves: Allied POWs in Germany 1939–1945. Gloucestershire: Arris. ISBN 978-1-84437-060-3.
- Looseley, Rhiannon (2005). Le Paradis apres l'Enfer: the French Soldiers Evacuated from Dunkirk in 1940 (MA dissertation History). University of Reading. 102786495. Archived from the original (online) on 31 March 2016.
- Lord, Walter (1983). The Miracle of Dunkirk. London: Allen Lane. ISBN 1-85326-685-X.
- McIntyre, Catherine (3 August 2017). "How Dunkirk's Canadian hero 'fell through the cracks' of history". Macleans.
- Melvin, Mungo (2010). Manstein: Hitler's Greatest General. London: Weidenfeld & Nicolson. ISBN 978-0-297-84561-4.
- Miller, Nathan (1997). War at Sea: A Naval History of World War II. New York: Oxford University Press. ISBN 0-19-511038-2.
- Mordal, Jacques (1968). Dunkerque (in French). Paris: Editions France Empire. OCLC 2192012.
- Murray, Williamson; Millett, Allan R. (2000). A War to Be Won. Cambridge, Massachusetts: Belknap Press. ISBN 0-674-00163-X.
- Nadeau, Jean-Benoît; Barlow, Julie (2003). Sixty Million Frenchmen Can't Be Wrong: Why We Love France But Not the French. Sourcebooks: Naperville, Illinois. ISBN 978-1-4022-0045-8.
- Operation "Dynamo": Evacuation of Troops from Dunkirk (ADM 199/792). The National Archives. 1940–1941.
- Noakes, J.; Pridham, G., eds. (1988). Foreign Policy, War and Racial Extermination. Nazism 1919–1945. Vol. 3. Exeter: University of Exeter Press. ISBN 978-0-85989-602-3.
- Ramsey, B. H. (17 July 1947). "The Evacuation of the Allied Armies from Dunkirk and Neighbouring Beaches" (PDF). London Gazette. London: His Majesty's Stationery Office: 3295–3318.
- Richardson, Matthew (2010). Tigers at Dunkirk: The Leicestershire Regiment and the Fall of France. Barnsley: Pen and Sword. ISBN 978-1-84884-210-6.
- Roberts, Andrew (2009). Masters and Commanders: The Military Geniuses who Led the West to Victory in World War II. London: Penguin. ISBN 978-0-141-02926-9.
- Roth, Ariel Ilan (2010). Leadership in International Relations: The Balance of Power and the Origins of World War II. New York: Palgrave Macmillan. ISBN 978-0-230-10690-1.
- Safire, William (2004). Lend Me Your Ears: Great Speeches in History. New York: Norton. ISBN 0-393-04005-4.
- Shephard, Ben (March 2003). A War of Nerves: Soldiers and Psychiatrists in the Twentieth Century. Cambridge: Harvard University Press. ISBN 978-0-674-01119-9.
- Shirer, William L. (1960). The Rise and Fall of the Third Reich. New York: Simon & Schuster. LCCN 60-6729.
- Smith, Peter C (2011). The Junkers Ju 87 Stuka: A Complete History. London: Crecy. ISBN 978-0-85979-156-4.
- Staff. "World War II: Dunkirk Evacuation". Encyclopædia Britannica.
- Stewart, Geoffrey (2008). Dunkirk and the Fall of France. Barnsley: Pen & Sword Military. ISBN 978-18-44-15803-4.
- Sweeting, Adam (21 May 2010). "Dunkirk: the soldiers left behind". The Daily Telegraph.
- Thompson, Julian (2011) [2008]. Dunkirk: Retreat to Victory. New York: Arcade. ISBN 978-1-61145-314-0.
- War Diary of Army Group A, pp. Volume 40, section 24
- Thompson, H. L. (1953). New Zealanders with the Royal Air Force. Official History of New Zealand in the Second World War 1939–45. Vol. I. Wellington, New Zealand: War History Branch. OCLC 270919916.
