= Suez Veterans' Association =

The Suez Veterans' Association is an association of those who served in the British Armed Forces and civilian support units in the Suez Canal Zone between 1939 and 1956 (the Suez Crisis). It was formed on the 15 April 1997 and membership is open to all British armed forces, nursing services and civilian support staff who served in the Suez Canal Zone.

== Medals ==
In June 2003 veterans were able to claim the Naval General Service Medal and the General Service Medal with Canal Zone clasp for serving in the Suez Canal Zone of Egypt between 16 October 1951 to 19 October 1954.

== Memorials ==
A plaque dedicated by the association is present in the Services Glade at the Fylde Memorial Arboretum and Community Woodland.

A memorial strands at the National Memorial Arboretum. The memorial consists of a pyramid shaped plinth set in amidst sand coloured paving slabs, and is carries a plaque bearing the badge of the association and an inscription.

Plaque inscription

This memorial is dedicated to the
Service Personnel
who served in the
Canal Zone of Egypt
and is a tribute to
those who died in the
course of their duty.
1939 - 1956
