= Normandy Veterans' Association =

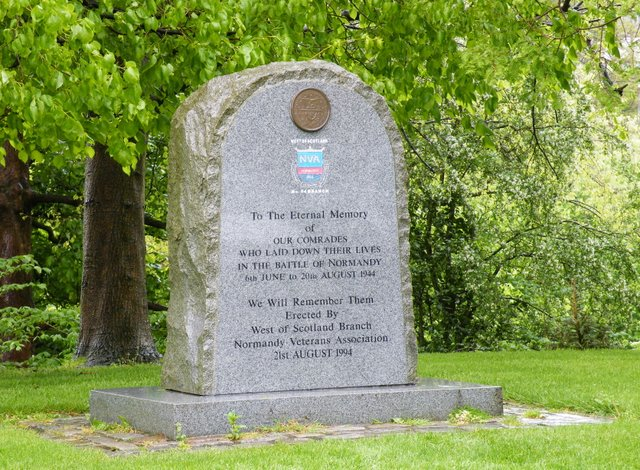
Normandy Veterans Association memorial, Kelvingrove Park, Glasgow

The Normandy Veterans' Association (NVA) was an association formed in 1981 of ex-servicemen and women who served in the 1944 Normandy invasion.

The association was represented at the 70th anniversary of D-Day in Normandy in June 2014. Due to dwindling numbers the association decided to disband in November 2014. The last official engagement of the association took place at St Margaret's, Westminster (Westminster Abbey) on 16 October 2014.

The National Standard of the NVA was 'laid up' at Westminster Abbey with a plaque that reads:

The Standard of the Normandy Veterans' Association was laid up on Thursday 16th October 2014 in the presence of His Royal Highness The Duke of Gloucester, KG., GCVO, Patron, Normandy Veterans Association.

== See also ==
- 1940 Dunkirk Veterans' Association
