= Peter C. Smith =

English writer

Peter C Smith [Peter Charles Horstead Smith] is the published author of 82 books of aeronautical, naval and military history including Pedestal - the Convoy that saved Malta; Task Force 57 - The British Pacific Fleet; The Junkers Ju 87 Stuka; Sailors in the Dock - A History of Naval Courts Martial down the Centuries; "The Vultee Vengeance in Battle", "The Petlyakov Pe-2 Peshka", "Sailors on the Rocks: Famous Royal Navy Shipwrecks" and Midway: Dauntless Victory.

Born in North Elmham, Norfolk, UK in October 1940, after living in London, Kent and Cambridge he has resided in the village of Riseley in Bedfordshire, UK with his wife Pat since 1982. He is a member of the Society of Authors, London, and the London Press Club.
