= 1940 Dunkirk Veterans' Association =

Association of British veterans

The 1940 Dunkirk Veterans' Association was an association of British service veterans "who served at Dunkirk and other ports of evacuation between 10 May and June 1940" – that is in the Dunkirk evacuation of 1940, including those who were taken prisoner. Associate membership was available to those "otherwise not qualified, but who had assisted at the ports of evacuation".

== Overview ==
The association was formed at Leeds in 1953. Five veterans who had been on the Dunkirk Beach or in the vicinity fighting, met in the bar of the Queens Hotel, City Square, Leeds on 3 September 1953. They wanted to foster the spirit of comradeship and support experienced during the evacuation and support fellow veterans who had fallen on hard times.

The first membership card, no 1, showed the 6d subscription collected and receipted by Harold Robinson (awarded MBE in 1970 for services to veterans charities) who had been voted in as Honorary General Secretary and stayed in that honorary post until his death in 1988, whilst working as a schoolteacher.

The association started to arrange pilgrimages to the beaches and towns from which troops had been evacuated including Dunkirk, De Panne, Bray Dunes and Calais. During the first pilgrimage by 45 veterans in 1954, they realised that the local towns and population were still suffering deprivation and shortages. Subsequently, DVA members arranged food parcels for the local population. As the DVA expanded more veterans joined the pilgrimages. The accepted rule was you paid your own way there and joined fellow veterans at pre-booked Hotel and B&B accommodation. Some stayed with families they had met during the evacuation who had assisted them, taking the opportunity to repay kindnesses. These pilgrimages took place when large parts of the towns and villages were still exhibiting severe War damage and rebuilding had not fully started.

Remembrance services were held on beaches and in villages, towns, many conducted by the Reverend Leslie Aitken (later Right Rev. and MBE) who was the DVA first and only 'Padre' having been part of the founding group. (Aitken was the author of Massacre on the road to Dunkirk, detailing the murder by an SS company of 45 officers and men at Wormhoudt in France.)

In 1956 Queen Elizabeth The Queen Mother agreed to be the patron and attended the 1957 pilgrimage, unveiling the Dunkirk Memorial and taking the salute at a march past of DVA members in the Place de Jean Bart in Dunkirk. Over 1000 veterans paraded.

At its peak membership in the mid 1970s over 20,000 veterans from the UK, with increasing numbers of ex-patriates and Commonwealth Dunkirk Veterans, would make the pilgrimage trip each year to honour their fallen comrades.

Distinguished DVA members included General James Steele, General Ashton Wade, Brigadier General James Gawthorpe, Squadron Leader Douglas Bader and Donald Kaberry (later Lord Kaberry of Adel).

Royal patronage continued with Prince Philip, Duke of Edinburgh taking the salute at the 40th anniversary parade in May 1980 in Folkestone.

Official 1940 DVA organised pilgrimages (arranged by Harold Robinson MBE) continued every year until 1988 (when he died in office) then became locally organised by branches until the 60th anniversary in 2000 when the association was disbanded centrally on 30 June in light of an aging and decreasing membership. That year 52 members met at the Imperial War Museum. The youngest attendee was 74 years old; he had been a stowaway on one of the Little Ships of Dunkirk. Some local branches maintained contact between members until time took its toll.

At its height, the 1940 Dunkirk Veterans Association had over 165,000 members worldwide, with over 100 branches in the UK, 20+ branches across the USA and Canada, 25+ branches across Australia, New Zealand and Indonesia, 12 branches across South Africa, Zimbabwe (Rhodesia at the time they were created) Kenya, Tanzania, branches in Gibraltar, Malta, Brazil and Argentina.

Harold Robinson fostered links between veterans associations in France, Belgium, Holland and Germany, promoting peace and comradeship between old soldiers. During the 1970s, when the British veterans became eligible for the Dunkirk Medal, he vetted all applications, processed and issued over 100,000 medals on behalf of the Dunkirk Town Council.

Upon his death in October 1988, his funeral was held at St Michael's and All Angels church, Headingley, Leeds. It was attended by over 2500 people, requiring a p.a system for the crowds outside. Attendees included The Lord Mayors of Leeds, Bradford, Dover, Folkestone, Margate, Ramsgate, the entire town councils and mayor's of Dunkirk, De Panne and Calais. Lord Lieutenant of West Yorkshire, Lord Kaberry of Adel (representing Prime Minister Margaret Thatcher) local MPs, DVA members from all UK branches bringing the branch standards, plus representative members from many overseas branches. The Yorkshire Regiment supplied an overnight guard of honour for the coffin in the church and paraded with the DVA at the start of the service. Many ex-pupils, taught through his 35years as a teacher, also attended. The service was conducted by the Right Reverend Leslie Aitken, the DVA padre and was followed by a private family cremation at Lawnswood Cemetery.

Robinson received many accolades during his life, including the MBE. Chevalier D'Honour, The Freedom of Dunkirk, The Freedom of De Panne. The Flandres-Dunkirk award, and awards from many other countries for his veteran support work. He occupied varying additional posts including 20 yrs as Chairman of the Headingley Branch of the Royal British Legion, Leeds Poppy Appeal organiser for the RBL, Parade Marshall for Leeds City Remembrance Day Parade, Council member of SAFA, regional Council member of RBL, and was also a hospice visitor for veterans. He spoke seven languages fluently and could 'get by' in several more, taught thousands of children and was married for 43 years to Eileen Robinson who died eight months after him.

== See also ==
- Dunkirk Medal
- Dunkirk Memorial
- Fylde Memorial Arboretum and Community Woodland
- Normandy Veterans' Association
