= Dunkirk Medal =

Unofficial commemorative medal by town of Dunkirk

Coordinates: 48.8602°N 2.3247°E

Dunkirk Medal – the Medaille Dunkerque 1940
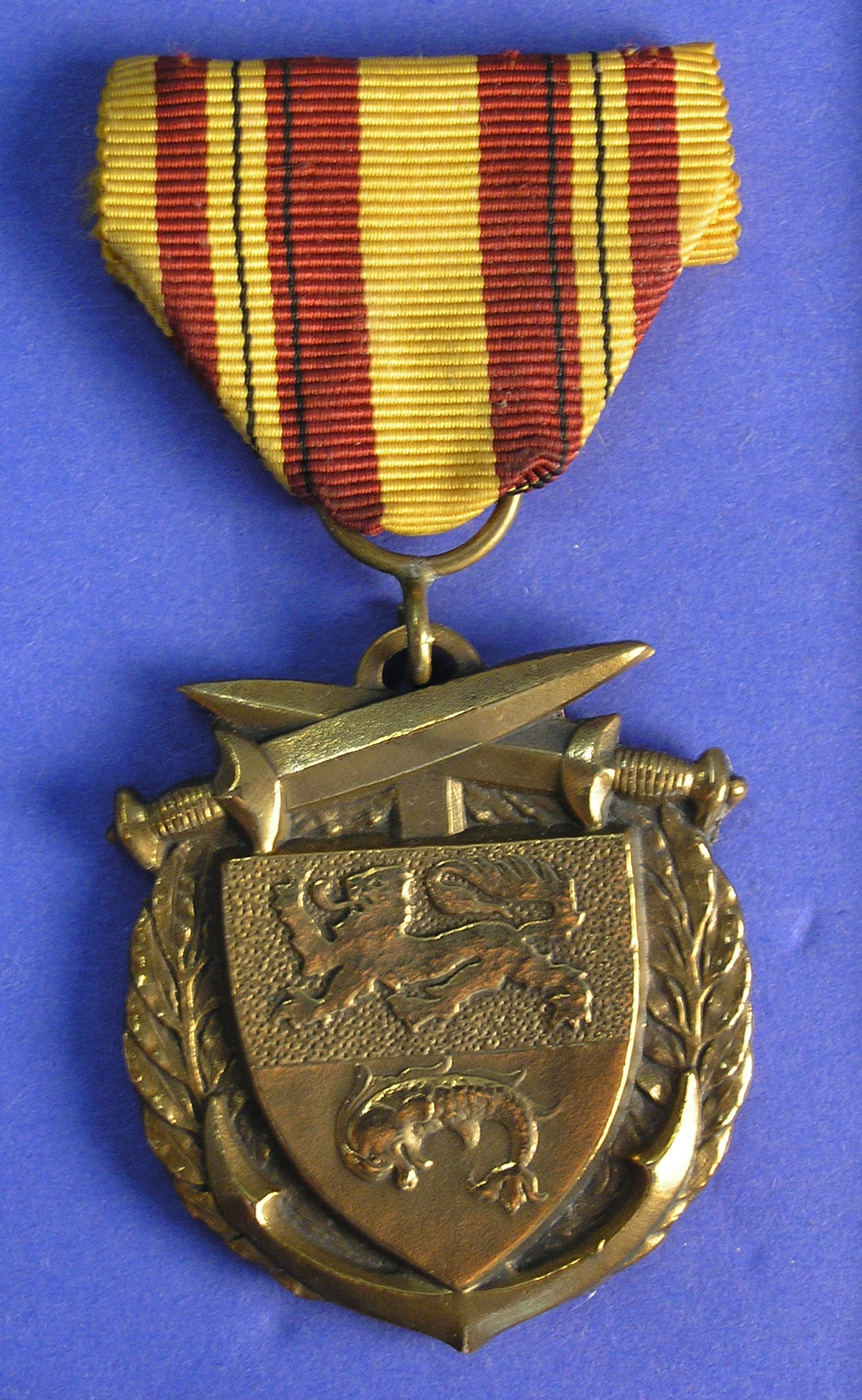

Awarded by France
- Type: Commemorative
- Established: 1 May 1960; 66 years ago
- Awarded for: For service during the defence of the port of Dunkirk, 1940
- Founder: Association nationale des anciens combattants de Flandres-Dunkerque 1940

Statistics
- First induction: 1960

The Dunkirk Medal (Medaille Dunkerque 1940) is an unofficial commemorative medal created by the town of Dunkirk to commemorate the defence of the town and surrounding area during May and June 1940. The allocation of the award was managed by Association nationale des anciens combattants de Flandres-Dunkerque 1940, the French National Association of Veterans of the Fortified Sector of Flanders and Dunkirk (and later administered by the now disbanded Dunkirk Veterans Association).

Initiated in 1960, the award was initially awarded to only French service personnel (with approximately 30,000 medals issued). In 1970 it was also awarded to any Allied member involved in Operation Dynamo, the evacuation of Allied forces from the Dunkirk sector between 29 May and 3 June and those soldiers evacuated from the beaches. All British servicemen from the Royal Navy, Royal Air Force, Merchant Navy, and the civilian little ship volunteers were eligible to receive the award.

== Description ==
The Dunkirk Medal is struck in bronze and measures approximately 44mm in length and 36mm wide. The medal's obverse depicts a shield bearing the arms of Dunkirk (a fish and in chief, a lion passant) superimposed on an anchor and laurel wreath, crossed swords above. The reverse of the medal features a burning oil lamp over a tablet with the inscription: DUNKERQUE 1940.

Beneath the ribbon suspension of the medal are crossed swords. A named certificate was issued with each medal though the medal itself was not inscribed.

The medal ribbon measures 36mm wide and features a wide central chrome yellow stripe with one wide and one thin red stripe each side with two further chrome yellow bars and two very thin black stripes.

For citizens of the United Kingdom, the medal may be worn on the right breast, but as it is not designated an official medal it is not to be mounted with other British official medals and awards.
