= Kenneth Branagh on stage and screen =

List of films featuring Kenneth Branagh

Kenneth Branagh filmography
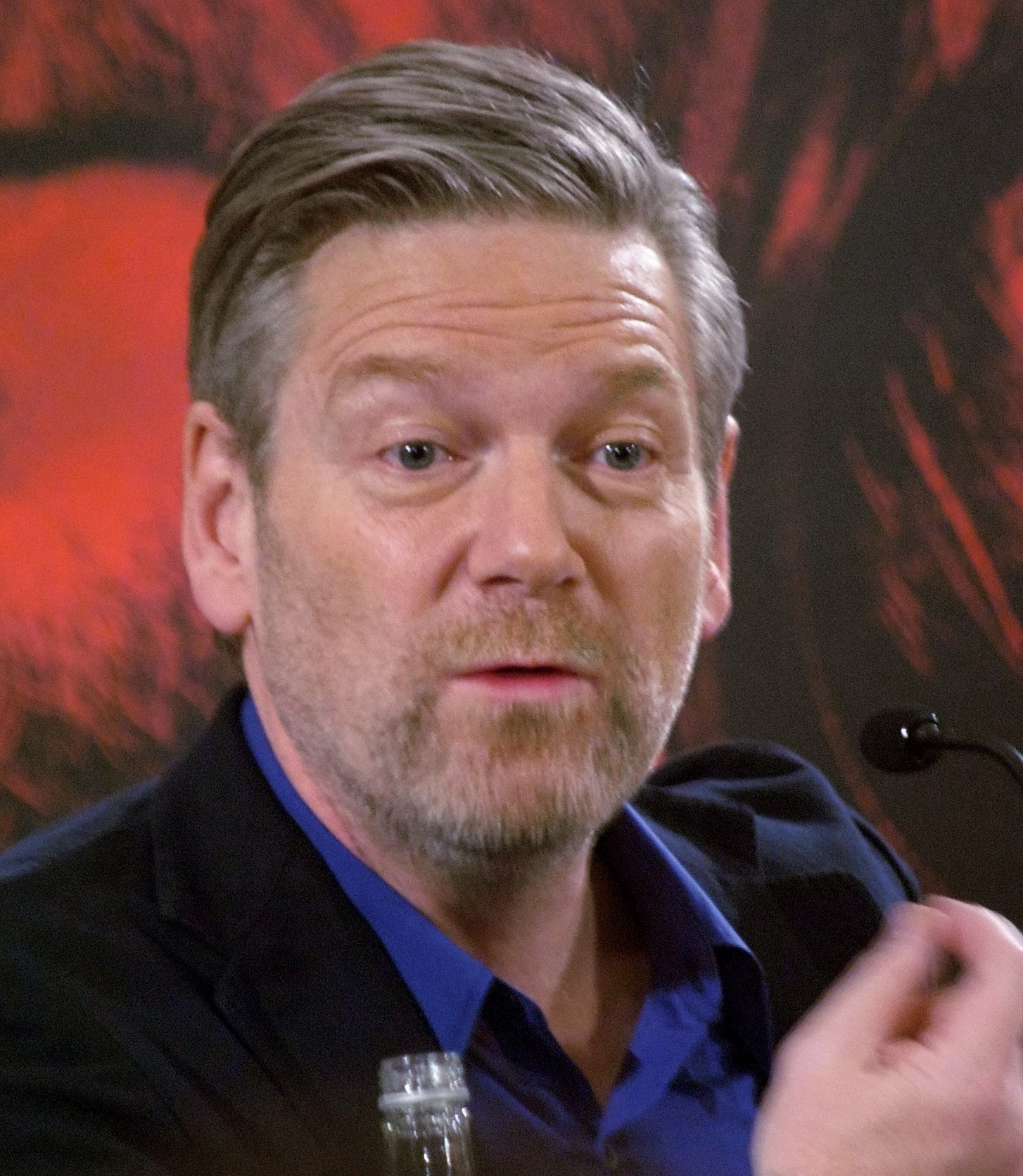
- Film: 45
- Television: 23
- Narrating: 16
- Theatre: 19

The following is the filmography for actor, director, producer and screenwriter Kenneth Branagh.

Branagh made his professional theatrical stage debut in Another Country (1982). He gained prominence acting in numerous productions with the Royal Shakespeare Company. He made his feature film debut in A Month in the Country (1987). He directed and starred in a string of successful film adaptations of William Shakespeare's plays, including Henry V (1989), Much Ado About Nothing (1993), Othello (1995), Hamlet (1996), and As You Like It (2006). He also directed Peter's Friends (1992), Mary Shelley's Frankenstein (1994), Thor (2011), Cinderella (2015), and Belfast (2021).

Branagh directed and starred as Hercule Poirot in Murder on the Orient Express (2017), Death on the Nile (2022), and A Haunting in Venice (2023). He has also acted in Celebrity (1998), Wild Wild West (1999), The Road to El Dorado (2000), Harry Potter and the Chamber of Secrets (2002), Rabbit-Proof Fence (2002), and Valkyrie (2008). His portrayal of Laurence Olivier in My Week with Marilyn (2011) earned him a nomination for the Academy Award for Best Supporting Actor. He has collaborated with Christopher Nolan acting in Dunkirk (2017), Tenet (2020), and Oppenheimer (2023).

== As actor ==
=== Film ===
Year	Title	Role	Notes	Ref.
1981	Chariots of Fire	Cambridge Student	Uncredited	
1985	Coming Through	D.H. Lawrence		
1987	A Month in the Country	James Moon		
1987	High Season	Rick		
1989	Henry V	Henry V		
1991	Dead Again	Mike Church / Roman Strauss		
1992	Peter's Friends	Andrew Benson		
1993	Swing Kids	Herr Knopp, Gestapo	Uncredited	
1993	Much Ado About Nothing	Benedick		
1994	Mary Shelley's Frankenstein	Victor Frankenstein		
1995	Othello	Iago		
1996	Hamlet	Prince Hamlet		
1998	The Gingerbread Man	Rick Magruder		
1998	The Proposition	Father Michael McKinnon		
1998	The Theory of Flight	Richard		
1998	Celebrity	Lee Simon		
1998	The Dance of the Shiva	Colonel Evans	Short film	
1999	Alien Love Triangle	Steven Chesterman	Short film	
1999	Wild Wild West	Dr. Arliss Loveless		
1999	Periwig Maker	The Periwig Maker	Short film	
2000	Love's Labour's Lost	Berowne		
2000	The Road to El Dorado	Miguel	Voice	
2000	How to Kill Your Neighbor's Dog	Peter McGowen		
2001	Schneider's 2nd Stage	Joseph Barnett	Short film	
2002	Rabbit-Proof Fence	A.O. Neville		
2002	Harry Potter and the Chamber of Secrets	Gilderoy Lockhart		
2004	Five Children & It	Uncle Albert		
2007	Sleuth	Man on TV	Uncredited	
2008	Valkyrie	Henning von Tresckow		
2009	The Boat That Rocked	Sir Alistair Dormandy		
2011	My Week with Marilyn	Laurence Olivier		
2012	Stars in Shorts	Mark Snow	Segment: "Prodigal"	
2014	Jack Ryan: Shadow Recruit	Viktor Cherevin		
2016	Mindhorn	Himself	Uncredited	
2017	Dunkirk	Commander Bolton		
2017	Murder on the Orient Express	Hercule Poirot		
2018	Avengers: Infinity War	Asgardian Distress Caller	Voice; uncredited	
2018	All Is True	William Shakespeare		
2020	Tenet	Andrei Sator		
2022	Fireheart	Shawn Nolan	Voice	
2022	Death on the Nile	Hercule Poirot		
2023	Oppenheimer	Niels Bohr		
2023	A Haunting in Venice	Hercule Poirot		
2025	The King of Kings	Charles Dickens	Voice	
2026	The Devil Wears Prada 2	Stuart Simmons		
2026	Atonement	Michael Reid		
2026	Mayday	Nikolai Ustinov		
2027	The Thomas Crown Affair †	TBA	Post-production	

=== Television ===
Year	Title	Role	Notes	Ref.
1982	Play for Tomorrow	Student	Episode: "Easter 2016"	
1982	Play for Today	Billy Martin	3 episodes	
1983	To the Lighthouse	Charles Tansley	Television film	
1983	Maybury	Robert Clyde Moffat	2 episodes	
1984	The Boy in the Bush	Jack Grant	Miniseries	
1985	Coming Through	D.H. Lawrence	Television film	
1987	The Lady's Not for Burning	Thomas Mendip	Television film	
1987	Lorna	Billy	Television film	
1987	Theatre Night	Oswald	Episode: "Ghosts"	
1987	Fortunes of War	Guy Pringle	7 episodes	
1988	Thompson	Various roles	6 episodes	
1988	American Playhouse	Gordan Evans	Episode: "Strange Interlude"	
1989	Look Back in Anger	Jimmy Porter	Television film	
1995	The Shadow of a Gunman	Donal Davoren	Episode: "Shadow of a Gunman"	
2001	Conspiracy	Reinhard Heydrich	Television film	
2002	Shackleton	Sir Ernest Henry Shackleton	Television film	
2005	Warm Springs	Franklin D. Roosevelt	Television film	
2008	10 Days to War	Colonel Tim Collins	Episode: "Our Business is North"	
2008–2016	Wallander	Kurt Wallander	12 episodes	
2018	Upstart Crow	Colin / The Stranger	Episode: "A Crow Christmas Carol"	
2022	This England	Boris Johnson	Main role	
2023	Blue Eye Samurai	Abijah Fowler	Voice, series regular	
2025	The American Revolution	Thomas Gage & Richard Howe	Voice; docuseries	

=== Theatre ===
Year	Title	Role	Venue	Ref.
1982	Another Country	Tommy Judd	Queen's Theatre, West End	
1984	Henry V	Henry V	Royal Shakespeare Theatre, Stratford-upon-Avon	
1984	Golden Girls	Mike Bassett	The Other Place, Stratford-upon-Avon	
1984	Hamlet	Laertes	Royal Shakespeare Theatre, Stratford-upon-Avon	
1984	Love's Labour's Lost	King of Navarre	Royal Shakespeare Theatre, Stratford-upon-Avon	
1984	Across The Roaring Hill	Performer	The Other Place, Stratford-upon-Avon	
1985	Hamlet	Laertes	Theatre Royal, Newcastle-under-Tyne	
1985	Henry V	Henry V	Theatre Royal, Newcastle-under-Tyne	
1985	Love's Labour's Lost	King of Navarre	Theatre Royal, Newcastle-under-Tyne	
1985	Golden Girls	Mike Bassett	Gulbenkian Studio, Newcastle-upon-Tyne	
1985	Across The Roaring Hill	Performer	Gulbenkian Studio, Newcastle-upon-Tyne	
1985	Hamlet	Laertes	Barbican Theatre, London	
1985	Henry V	Henry V	Barbican Theatre, London	
1985	The Glass Maze	Performer	Almeida Theatre, London	
1985	Love's Labour's Lost	King of Navarre	Barbican Theatre, London	
1985	Doom Doom Doom Doom	Denis	Almeida Theatre, London	
1988	As You Like It	Touchstone	Birmingham Repertory Theatre	
1988	Much Ado About Nothing	Benedick	Birmingham Repertory Theatre	
1988	Hamlet	Hamlet	Birmingham Repertory Theatre	
1988	As You Like It	Touchstone	Phoenix Theatre, West End	
1988	Much Ado About Nothing	Benedick	Phoenix Theatre, West End	
1988	Hamlet	Hamlet	Phoenix Theatre, West End	
1990	A Midsummer Night's Dream	Quince	Dominion Theatre, West End	
1990	King Lear	Edgar	Dominion Theatre, West End	
1992	Coriolanus	Coriolanus	Chichester Festival Theatre	
1992	Hamlet	Hamlet	Barbican Theatre, London	
1993	Hamlet	Hamlet	Royal Shakespeare Theatre, Stratford-upon-Avon	
2003	Edmond	Edmond	Olivier Theatre, Royal National Theatre, London	
2008	Ivanov	Nikolai Ivanov	Wyndham's Theatre, West End	
2011	The Painkiller	Ralph	Lyric Theatre, Belfast	
2013	Macbeth	Macbeth	Campfield Market Hall, UK	
2014	Macbeth	Macbeth	Park Avenue Armory, Off-Broadway	
2016	The Winter's Tale	Leontes	Garrick Theatre, West End	
2016	Harlequinade	Arthur Gosport	Garrick Theatre, West End	
2016	The Painkiller	Ralph	Garrick Theatre, West End	
2016	The Entertainer	Archie Rice	Garrick Theatre, West End	
2023	King Lear	King Lear	Wyndham's Theatre, West End	
2024	King Lear	King Lear	The Shed, Off-Broadway	
2026	The Tempest	Prospero	Royal Shakespeare Theatre, Stratford-upon-Avon	
2026	The Cherry Orchard	Lopakhin	Swan Theatre, Stratford-upon-Avon	

=== Narrator ===
Year	Title	Notes	Ref.
1995	Anne Frank Remembered	Documentary film	
1996	Cinema Europe: The Other Hollywood	6 episodes	
1997	Great Composers	7 episodes	
1998	Cold War	24 episodes	
1998	Universal Horror	Documentary film	
1999	Walking with Dinosaurs	6 episodes	
1999	IMAX: Galapagos	Documentary short film	
2001	The Science of Walking with Beasts	2 episodes	
2001	The Ballad of Big Al	2 episodes	
2001	Walking with Beasts	6 episodes	
2002	The Tramp and the Dictator	Documentary film	
2005	Walking with Monsters: Life Before Dinosaurs	3 episodes	
2005	Das Goebbels-Experiment	Documentary film	
2005	World War 1 in Colour	6 episodes	
2006	The American Experience	Episode: "The Man Behind Hitler"	
2011	A Poem is...	3 episodes	

== As director ==
=== Film ===
Year	Title	Director	Writer	Producer	Notes	Ref.
1989	Henry V	Yes	Yes	No		
1991	Dead Again	Yes	No	No		
1992	Swan Song	Yes	No	No	Short film	
1992	Peter's Friends	Yes	No	Yes		
1993	Much Ado About Nothing	Yes	Yes	Yes		
1994	Mary Shelley's Frankenstein	Yes	No	No		
1995	In the Bleak Midwinter	Yes	Yes	No		
1996	Hamlet	Yes	Yes	No		
2000	Love's Labour's Lost	Yes	Yes	Yes		
2003	Listening	Yes	Yes	No	Short film	
2006	As You Like It	Yes	Yes	Yes		
2006	The Magic Flute	Yes	Yes	No		
2007	Sleuth	Yes	No	Yes		
2011	Thor	Yes	No	No		
2014	Jack Ryan: Shadow Recruit	Yes	No	No		
2015	Cinderella	Yes	No	No		
2017	Murder on the Orient Express	Yes	No	Yes		
2018	All Is True	Yes	No	No		
2020	Artemis Fowl	Yes	No	Yes		
2021	Belfast	Yes	Yes	Yes		
2022	Death on the Nile	Yes	No	Yes		
2023	A Haunting in Venice	Yes	No	Yes		
TBA	The Last Disturbance of Madeline Hynde †	Yes	Yes	Yes		

=== Theatre ===
Year	Title	Venue	Notes	Ref.
2001	The Play What I Wrote	Liverpool Playhouse		
2001	The Play What I Wrote	Wyndham's Theatre, West End		
2003	The Play What I Wrote	Lyceum Theatre, Broadway		
2013	Macbeth	Campfield Market Hall, UK	with Rob Ashford	
2014	Macbeth	Park Avenue Armory, Off-Broadway	with Rob Ashford	
2015	The Winter's Tale	Garrick Theatre, West End	with Rob Ashford	
2015	Harlequinade / All On Her Own	Garrick Theatre, West End	with Rob Ashford	
2016	Romeo and Juliet	Garrick Theatre, West End	with Rob Ashford	

== See also ==
- List of awards and nominations received by Kenneth Branagh
