= List of awards and nominations received by Kenneth Branagh =

Sir Kenneth Branagh awards and nominations
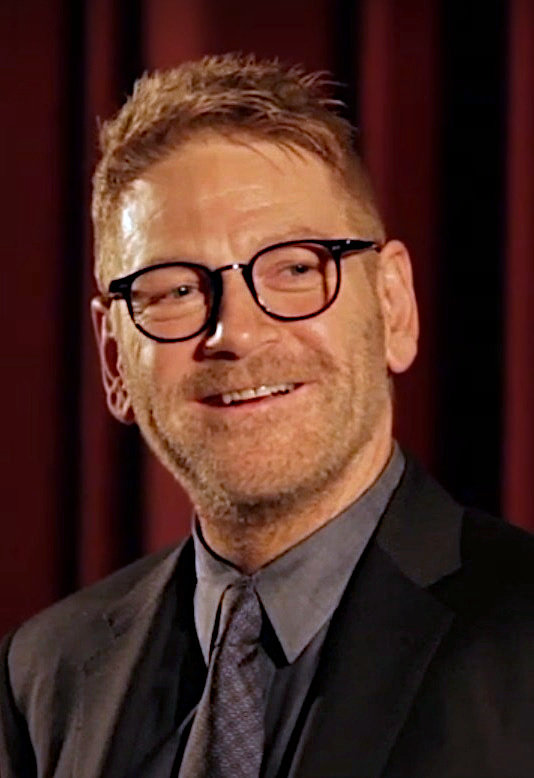
- Branagh in 2015
Awards and nominations
Award	Wins	Nominations
Academy Awards	1	8
BAFTA Awards	4	11
Critics' Choice	2	5
Emmy Awards	2	5
Golden Globe Awards	1	8
Grammy Awards	0	1
Olivier Awards	2	7
Actor Award	1	3

Totals (Note: Certain award groups do not simply award one winner. They acknowledge several different recipients, have runners-up, and have third place. Since this is a specific recognition and is different from losing an award, runner-up mentions are considered wins in this award tally. For simplification and to avoid errors, each award in this list has been presumed to have had a prior nomination.)
- Wins: 11
- Nominations: 43

Sir Kenneth Branagh is known as an actor and filmmaker, often adapting the works of William Shakespeare for the stage and screen. His accolades include an Academy Award, an Actor Award, four BAFTA Awards, two Critics' Choice Awards, a Golden Globe Award, two Emmy Awards, and two Olivier Awards, as well as a nomination for a Grammy Award. He was honored with the BAFTA Award for Outstanding Contribution to British Cinema Award in 1995, and the Society of London Theatre Special Award in 2017 and was knighted by Queen Elizabeth II in 2012.

Branagh first gained prominence for portraying the title role in the historical drama Henry (1989), which he also directed and adapted based on the William Shakespeare play of the same name. For the film, won the BAFTA Award for Best Direction as received Academy Award nominations for Best Director and Best Actor. He directed neo-noir romantic thriller Dead Again (1991) which competed for the Berlin International Film Festival's Golden Bear. He directed the short film Swan Song (1992) earning a nomination for the Academy Award for Best Live Action Short Film. The following year he starred and adapted Shakespeare's Much Ado About Nothing (1993) which competed for the Cannes Film Festival's Palme d'Or. He played Iago in the Oliver Parker directed Othello (1995) earning a Actor Award for Best Supporting Actor nomination. He then portrayed Prince Hamlet in the historical epic Hamlet (1996), which he also directed and adapted, earning a nomination for the Academy Award for Best Adapted Screenplay.

He portrayed Sir Laurence Olivier in the historical dramedy My Week with Marilyn (2011) for which he earned nominations for the Academy Award, Actor Award, BAFTA Award, Critics' Choice Award and Golden Globe Award for Best Supporting Actor. He directed and wrote the semi-autobiographical drama Belfast (2021) which earned him the Academy Award for Best Original Screenplay, the BAFTA Award for Outstanding British Film, and the Golden Globe Award for Best Screenplay. He portrayed the Danish physicist Niels Bohr in the Christopher Nolan directed historical epic Oppenheimer (2023) which he won the Actor Award for Outstanding Cast in a Motion Picture along with the ensemble.

On television, he the Nazi officer Reinhard Heydrich in the HBO film Conspiracy (2001) for which he won the Primetime Emmy Award for Outstanding Lead Actor in a Limited Series or Movie. For his role as Kurt Wallander in the mystery series Wallander (2008–2016), he received the International Emmy Award for Best Actor and the British Academy Television Award for Best Actor. He was further Emmy-nominated for his roles as Ernest Shackleton in the miniseries Shackleton (2002), Franklin D. Roosevelt in the film Warm Springs (2005), and the title role in Wallander (2009).

On stage, Branagh trained at the Royal Academy of Dramatic Art before starring in productions in the Royal Shakespeare Company on the West End. He won the Laurence Olivier Award for Best Newcomer in a Play for his role in the Julian Mitchell play Another Country (1982). He went on to receive nominations for the Laurence Olivier Award for Best Actor for his performances in Henry V (1985), Edmond (2004) and The Winter's Tale (2016). He was also nominated for the Laurence Olivier Award for Best Comedy Performance for As You Like It (1988).

== Major associations ==
=== Academy Awards ===
Year	Category	Nominated work	Result	Ref.
1989	Best Director	Henry V	Nominated	
1989	Best Actor	Henry V	Nominated	
1992	Best Live Action Short Film	Swan Song	Nominated	
1996	Best Adapted Screenplay	Hamlet	Nominated	
2011	Best Supporting Actor	My Week with Marilyn	Nominated	
2021	Best Picture	Belfast	Nominated	
2021	Best Director	Belfast	Nominated	
2021	Best Original Screenplay	Belfast	Won	

=== Actor Awards ===
Year	Category	Nominated work	Result	Ref.
1995	Outstanding Actor in a Supporting Role	Othello	Nominated	
2005	Outstanding Actor in a Miniseries or Television Movie	Warm Springs	Nominated	
2011	Outstanding Actor in a Supporting Role	My Week with Marilyn	Nominated	
2023	Outstanding Cast in a Motion Picture	Oppenheimer	Won	

=== BAFTA Awards ===
Year	Category	Nominated work	Result	Ref.
British Academy Film Awards
1989	Best Direction	Henry V	Won	
1989	Best Leading Actor	Henry V	Nominated	
1993	Outstanding British Contribution to Cinema Award	—N/a	Recipient	
2011	Best Supporting Actor	My Week with Marilyn	Nominated	
2021	Best Film	Belfast	Nominated	
2021	Best Original Screenplay	Belfast	Nominated	
2021	Outstanding British Film	Belfast	Won	
British Academy Television Awards
Year	Category	Nominated work	Result	Ref.
1988	Best Actor	Fortunes of War	Nominated	
2003	Best Actor	Conspiracy	Nominated	
2003	Best Actor	Shackleton	Nominated	
2009	Best Drama Series	Wallander	Won	
2010	Best Actor	Wallander	Won	
BAFTA/LA Britannia Awards
Year	Category	Nominated work	Result	Ref.
2017	Albert R. Broccoli Britannia Award for Worldwide Contribution to Entertainment		Recipient	

=== Critics' Choice Awards ===
Year	Category	Nominated work	Result	Ref.
2011	Best Supporting Actor	My Week with Marilyn	Nominated	
2017	Best Acting Ensemble Cast	Dunkirk	Nominated	
2021	Best Director	Belfast	Nominated	
2021	Best Original Screenplay	Belfast	Won	
2023	Best Acting Ensemble Cast	Oppenheimer	Won	

=== Emmy Awards ===
Year	Category	Nominated work	Result	Ref.
Primetime Emmy Awards
2001	Outstanding Lead Actor in a Miniseries or a Movie	Conspiracy	Won	
2002	Outstanding Lead Actor in a Miniseries or a Movie	Shackleton	Nominated	
2005	Outstanding Lead Actor in a Miniseries or a Movie	Warm Springs	Nominated	
2009	Outstanding Lead Actor in a Miniseries or a Movie	Wallander	Nominated	
International Emmy Awards
Year	Category	Nominated work	Result	Ref.
2017	Best Performance by an Actor	Wallander	Won	

=== Golden Globe Awards ===
Year	Category	Nominated work	Result	Ref.
1993	Best Motion Picture – Musical or Comedy	Much Ado About Nothing	Nominated	
2001	Best Actor – Miniseries or Television Film	Conspiracy	Nominated	
2005	Best Actor – Miniseries or Television Film	Warm Springs	Nominated	
2009	Best Actor – Miniseries or Television Film	Wallander	Nominated	
2011	Best Supporting Actor – Motion Picture	My Week with Marilyn	Nominated	
2021	Best Motion Picture – Drama	Belfast	Nominated	
2021	Best Director	Belfast	Nominated	
2021	Best Screenplay	Belfast	Won	

=== Grammy Awards ===
Year	Category	Nominated work	Result	Ref.
1994	Best Spoken Word Album	Hamlet	Nominated	

=== Olivier Awards ===
Year	Category	Nominated work	Result	Ref.
1982	Best Newcomer	Another Country	Won	
1985	Best Actor	Henry V	Nominated	
1988	Best Comedy Performance	As You Like It	Nominated	
2004	Best Actor	Edmond	Nominated	
2016	Best Actor	The Winter's Tale	Nominated	
2016	Best Director	The Winter's Tale	Nominated	
2017	Society of London Theatre Special Award		Recipient	

== Major festivals ==
Organizations	Year	Category	Work	Result	Ref.
Berlin International Film Festival	1992	Golden Bear	Dead Again	Nominated	
Cannes Film Festival	1993	Palme d'Or	Much Ado About Nothing	Nominated	
Toronto International Film Festival	2021	People's Choice Award	Belfast	Won	
Venice Film Festival	1995	Golden Lion	In the Bleak Midwinter	Nominated	
Venice Film Festival	1995	Golden Osella	In the Bleak Midwinter	Won	
Venice Film Festival	2007	Golden Lion	Sleuth	Nominated	
Venice Film Festival	2007	Queer Lion	Sleuth	Nominated	
Venice Film Festival	2007	Queer Lion - Special Mention	Sleuth	Won	

== Other awards and nominations ==
Organizations	Year	Category	Work	Result	Ref.
AACTA Awards	2022	Best Film	Belfast	Nominated	
AACTA Awards	2022	Best Direction	Belfast	Nominated	
AACTA Awards	2022	Best Screenplay	Belfast	Nominated	
AARP Movies for Grownups Awards	2018	Best Director	Murder on the Orient Express	Nominated	
AARP Movies for Grownups Awards	2019	Best Director	All Is True	Nominated	
AARP Movies for Grownups Awards	2019	Best Grownup Love Story	All Is True	Nominated	
AARP Movies for Grownups Awards	2022	Best Movie	Belfast	Won	
AARP Movies for Grownups Awards	2022	Best Director	Belfast	Nominated	
AARP Movies for Grownups Awards	2022	Best Screenwriter	Belfast	Nominated	
AARP Movies for Grownups Awards	2022	Best Intergenerational Film	Belfast	Nominated	
AARP Movies for Grownups Awards	2022	Best Time Capsule	Belfast	Nominated	
Broadcasting Press Guild	2008	Best Actor	Wallander: One Step Behind	Won	
Capri Hollywood International Film Festival	2011	Best Ensemble Cast	My Week with Marilyn	Won	
Capri Hollywood International Film Festival	2021	Best Original Screenplay	Belfast	Won	
Capri Hollywood International Film Festival	2023	Best Ensemble Cast	Oppenheimer	Won	
Chicago Film Critics Association	1989	Best Actor	Henry V	Nominated	
Chicago Film Critics Association	1996	Best Actor	Hamlet	Nominated	
Detroit Film Critics Society	2011	Best Supporting Actor	My Week with Marilyn	Nominated	
Directors Guild of America Awards	2022	Outstanding Directing – Feature Film	Belfast	Nominated	
European Film Awards	1990	European Actor of the Year	Henry V	Won	
European Film Awards	1990	Young European Film of the Year	Henry V	Won	
European Film Awards	2022	European Screenwriter	Belfast	Nominated	
Golden Raspberry Awards	1999	Worst Supporting Actor	Wild Wild West	Nominated	
Independent Spirit Awards	1993	Best Film	Much Ado About Nothing	Nominated	
London Film Critics' Circle	1993	British Producer of the Year	Much Ado About Nothing	Won	
London Film Critics' Circle	2002	British Supporting Actor of the Year	Harry Potter and the Chamber of Secrets	Won	
London Film Critics' Circle	2011	Supporting Actor of the Year	My Week with Marilyn	Won	
Middleburg Film Festival	2021	Director Spotlight Award	Lifetime Achievement	Won	
Phoenix Film Critics Society	2011	Best Supporting Actor	My Week with Marilyn	Nominated	
Producers Guild of America Awards	2022	Best Theatrical Motion Picture	Belfast	Nominated	
San Diego Film Critics Society	1996	Best Actor	Hamlet	Won	
Sant Jordi Awards	1989	Best Foreign Actor	Henry V	Won	
Satellite Awards	2005	Best Actor – Miniseries or Television Film	Warm Springs	Nominated	
Satellite Awards	2009	Best Actor – Miniseries or Television Film	Wallander: One Step Behind	Nominated	
Satellite Awards	2011	Best Supporting Actor – Motion Picture	My Week with Marilyn	Nominated	
Satellite Awards	2021	Best Motion Picture – Drama	Belfast	Won	
Satellite Awards	2021	Best Director	Belfast	Nominated	
Satellite Awards	2021	Best Original Screenplay	Belfast	Won	
Saturn Awards	1994	Best Actor	Frankenstein	Nominated	
Vancouver Film Critics Circle	2011	Best Supporting Actor	My Week with Marilyn	Nominated	
WDCAFC Awards	2011	Best Supporting Actor	My Week with Marilyn	Nominated	
WhatsOnStage Awards	2004	Best Actor in a Play	Edmond	Won	
WhatsOnStage Awards	2009	Best Actor in a Play	Ivanov	Won	
WhatsOnStage Awards	2017	Best Actor in a Play	The Entertainer	Nominated	

== Honorary awards ==
Organizations	Year	Award	Result	Ref.
British Academy Film Awards	1993	BAFTA Outstanding British Contribution to Cinema Award	Honored	
Queen Elizabeth II	2012	Knight Commander of the Order of the British Empire	Honored	
Britannia Awards	2017	Worldwide Contribution to Entertainment Award	Honored	
Laurence Olivier Awards	2017	Society of London Theatre Special Award	Honored	
City of Belfast	2018	Freedom of the City of Belfast	Honored	
SCAD Savannah Film Festival	2021	Lifetime Achievement in Acting and Directing Award	Honored	

== Directed Academy Award-related performances ==
Branagh has directed multiple Academy Award nominated performances in his features.

Year	Performer	Motion Picture	Result
Academy Award for Best Actor
1990	Himself	Henry V	Nominated
Academy Award for Best Supporting Actor
2022	Ciarán Hinds	Belfast	Nominated
Academy Award for Best Supporting Actress
2022	Judi Dench	Belfast	Nominated
