= Jimmy Yuill =

Scottish actor

- Born: James Evander Munro Yuill; 13 February 1956 (age 70); Golspie, Scotland
- Occupation: Actor
- Years active: 1977–present

James Evander Munro Yuill (born 13 February 1956) is a Scottish actor.

He is a member of the Royal Shakespeare Company and later joined the Renaissance Theatre Company, where he first worked with Kenneth Branagh. He went on to appear in many of Branagh's films, most recently as Edward Woolmer in the 2018 film All Is True. Yuill, along with Richard Briers, are the only actors to have appeared in all five of Branagh's film adaptations of Shakespeare plays (Henry V, Much Ado About Nothing, Hamlet, Love's Labour's Lost, and As You Like It). He was also the music composer for A Midwinter's Tale and Swan Song.

He is best known for the character Detective Inspector Doug Kersey in the popular British television series Wycliffe. He was in every episode except the last three in Series 5. The series was cancelled after that because Jack Shepherd refused to continue in the title role when the producers had sacked Yuill "for insurance reasons" after he contracted life-threatening meningitis during filming, and then would not reinstate him even though he made a full recovery.

In June 2006, Yuill made his first appearance in EastEnders as the recurring character Victor Brown. In October 2007, he took the lead in Sophocles' Antigone as Creon, King of Thebes at The Tron Theatre, Glasgow.

In 2010, he was nominated for the award of Best Male Performance for his role in a play adaption of the Testament of Cresseid by the Critics Award for Theatre in Scotland.

Yuill has worked as a performance consultant on a number of productions, and also as a producer.

== Selected roles ==
- The Mackinnons (1977, TV series) as Tom Stewart
- A Sense of Freedom (1977, film) as Dunkie
- Death Watch (1978, film)
- Square Mile of Murder (1980, TV series)
- Play for Today: The Good Time Girls (1981, TV play) as Finlayson
- Andrina (1981, TV play) as Stanley
- Mindrape (1982, play at the Sheffield Crucible and Greenwich Theatres)
- People V Scott (1982, TV movie) as Kevin Gourlay
- The World Cup: A Captain's Tale (1982, TV movie) (uncredited)
- Objects of Affection (1982, TV series) as Charles
- Local Hero (1983, film) as Iain, the man who asks Mac for his autograph near the end of the film
- Boon (1987–1992, TV series) as Eric
- Eurocops (1988, TV series) as McCulloch
- Henry V (1989, film) as Jamy
- Paper Mask (1990, film) as Alec Moran
- Much Ado About Nothing (1993, film) as the Friar
- Grushko (1994, TV series) as Chazov
- The Inspector Alleyn Mysteries (1994–1995, TV series) as Angus Findlay
- Frankenstein (1994, film)
- Hamish Macbeth (1994, TV series) as Lachlan McRae (Series 1)
- A Mugs Game (1995, TV series) as Alan
- Wycliffe (1994–1998, TV series) as DI Doug Kersey
- Casualty (1998, TV series) as Donald Mallett
- Psychos (1999, TV miniseries)
- Monsignor Renard (2000, TV series) as Malo Gagnepain
- Strictly Sinatra (2000, film)
- Brotherly Love (2000, TV series) as Callum
- Schneider's 2nd Stage (2001, film short) as Detective Chief Inspector
- A Touch of Frost (2003, TV) as Charles Lightfoot in "Close Encounters"
- Murphy's Law (2004, TV series) as Miller Davidson, arms smuggler
- Ladies in Lavender (2004, film) as Constable Timmins
- The Inspector Lynley Mysteries (2005, TV series) as PC Garrett in In Divine Proportion
- Dalziel and Pascoe (2006, TV series) as Robert MacAlpine in "Guardian Angel"
- As You Like It (2006, film) as Corin
- EastEnders (2006–present, TV series) as Victor Brown
- Antigone (2007, play) as Creon, King of Thebes
- The Bill (2007–2009, TV series) as Martin Turnbull
- Holby City (2008–2022, TV series) as Kenneth McGivering
- Taggart (2009–2011, TV series) as DCI Wilson
- Princess Kaiulani (2010, film) as Archie Cleghorn
- Terry Pratchett's Going Postal (2010, miniseries) as Mr. Spools
- New Tricks (2010, TV series) as George Milligan in "The Fourth Man"
- Retreat (2011, film)
- The Raven (2012, film) as Captain Eldridge
- Macbeth (2013, National Theatre Live production with Kenneth Branagh) as Banquo
- All Is True (2018, film) as Edward Woolmer
