= Edward Jewesbury =

English actor (1917–2001)

- Born: Reginald Edward Oliphant Jewesbury; 6 August 1917; London, England
- Died: 31 March 2001 (aged 83); Esher, Surrey, England
- Occupation: Actor
- Spouse: Christine Roberts (m. 1939; died 1982)
- Children: 2

Reginald Edward Oliphant Jewesbury (6 August 1917 – 31 March 2001) was a British actor, most notable for his film, stage and television work, and as a member of the Renaissance Theatre Company. In 1982, he appeared with The Royal Shakespeare Company, appearing in The Tempest, Much Ado About Nothing and in Cyrano de Bergerac, the latter two of which he brought to Broadway in 1984, together with Sir Derek Jacobi and Sinéad Cusack. In his later years he appeared in television comedies such as Yes Minister and Blackadder II.

In 1995, Edward Jewesbury appeared in Richard III as King Henry VI of England.

== Partial filmography ==
- John Wesley (1954) – James Hutton
- Out of the Clouds (1955) – Captain Brent's Flight Engineer (uncredited)
- The Winter's Tale (1967) – Shepherd / Gaoler
- Sacco e Vanzetti (1971) – Alvan T. Fuller
- Little Dorrit (1987) – Magnate from the Lords
- We Think the World of You (1988) – Judge
- Henry V (1989) – Sir Thomas Erpingham
- Peter's Friends (1992) – Mr. Gooch, Peter's Solicitor
- Much Ado About Nothing (1993) – Sexton
- Mary Shelley's Frankenstein (1994) – City Official
- Richard III (1995) – King Henry
- The Grotesque (1995) – Sir Edward Tome
- In the Bleak Midwinter (1995) – Nina's Father
- Preaching to the Perverted (1997) – Judge Yell
- Mrs Dalloway (1997) – Professor Brierly
- Beautiful People (1999) – Joseph Thornton
- The 10th Kingdom (2000) – Old Retainer
- Undertaker's Paradise (2000)
- Dungeons & Dragons (2000) – Vildan Vildir
