= Chicago Film Critics Association Awards 1989 =

Annual US film awards ceremony

The 2nd Chicago Film Critics Association Awards were announced on March 8, 1990, at an awards ceremony held in The Pump Room. They honor achievements in 1989 filmmaking. Twenty-seven of the CFCA members voted for the awards. Do the Right Thing earned three accolades, including Best Film, and its director Spike Lee commented that the awards made up for the lack of nominations at that year's Academy Awards. Actress Laura San Giacomo received two awards for her role as Cynthia Patrice Bishop in Sex, Lies, and Videotape.

== Winners ==
The winners for the 27nd Chicago Film Critics Association Awards are as follows:

=== Best Actor ===
Tom Cruise – Born on the Fourth of July

=== Best Actress ===
Michelle Pfeiffer – The Fabulous Baker Boys

=== Best Director ===
Spike Lee – Do the Right Thing

=== Best Film ===
Do the Right Thing

=== Best Foreign Film ===
Henry V

=== Best Supporting Actor ===
Danny Aiello – Do the Right Thing

=== Best Supporting Actress ===
Laura San Giacomo – Sex, Lies, and Videotape

=== Most Promising Actor ===
John Cusack – Say Anything...

=== Most Promising Actress ===
Laura San Giacomo – Sex, Lies, and Videotape
