= As You Like It (2006 film) =

2006 film by Kenneth Branagh

- Film poster
- Directed by: Kenneth Branagh
- Screenplay by: Kenneth Branagh
- Based on: As You Like It by William Shakespeare
- Produced by: Kenneth Branagh; Judy Hofflund; Simon Moseley
- Starring: Romola Garai; Bryce Dallas Howard; Kevin Kline; Adrian Lester; Janet McTeer; Alfred Molina; David Oyelowo; Brian Blessed
- Cinematography: Roger Lanser
- Edited by: Neil Farrell
- Music by: Patrick Doyle
- Production companies: HBO Films; Picturehouse; BBC Films; The Shakespeare Film Company
- Distributed by: Lionsgate (United Kingdom); Picturehouse (United States)
- Release dates: 1 September 2006 (Italy); 21 August 2007 (United States); 21 September 2007 (United Kingdom)
- Running time: 127 minutes
- Countries: United Kingdom; United States
- Language: English
- Box office: $563,162

As You Like It is a 2006 romance film written and directed by Kenneth Branagh, and based on William Shakespeare's play of the same name. The film stars Romola Garai, Bryce Dallas Howard, Kevin Kline, Adrian Lester, Janet McTeer, Alfred Molina, David Oyelowo and Brian Blessed in a dual role.

The film transferred the play's original setting to a late 19th-century European colony in Japan after the Meiji Restoration. Filming took place at Shepperton Film Studios and at the never-before-filmed gardens of Wakehurst Place. Produced by The Shakespeare Film Company and financed by HBO Films and BBC Film, it is the fifth Shakespeare adaptation by Branagh, and the only one not to feature Branagh himself in the cast, though he has a vocal cameo towards the end of the film.

The film premiered in Italy on 1 September 2006 before being released by Picturehouse in the United States on 21 August 2007 and by Lionsgate in the United Kingdom on 21 September 2007. It received mixed reviews.

== Cast ==
- Romola Garai as Celia
- Bryce Dallas Howard as Rosalind
- Kevin Kline as Jaques
- Adrian Lester as Oliver de Boys
- Janet McTeer as Audrey
- Alfred Molina as Touchstone
- David Oyelowo as Orlando de Boys
- Brian Blessed as Duke Senior and Duke Frederick
- Jotham Annan as Jaques de Boys
- Richard Briers as Adam
- Paul Chan as William
- Richard Clifford as Le Beau
- Patrick Doyle as Amiens
- Gerard Horan as Denis
- Jade Jefferies as Phoebe
- Alex Wyndham as Silvius
- Jimmy Yuill as Corin

== Japanese setting ==
Although the film was not made in Japan, Branagh sets the play there during the late nineteenth century among English traders. Branagh portrays Duke Senior's court as a British outpost whose ruler admires Japanese culture: although most of the inhabitants wear European clothes, Duke Senior and his brother both wear Japanese clothes. Each British lady at the outpost covers her face modestly with a fan, and styles her hair in a Japanese manner. When the banished characters travel to the Forest of Arden, both Japanese and western actors portray its inhabitants: Phoebe and William are Japanese, Corin and Audrey are European, while Silvius is a European who wears Japanese clothes. Black British actors play the de Boys brothers, Orlando and Oliver. Orlando fights a sumo wrestler.

Branagh invented a prologue in which ninja warriors attack Duke Senior's family as it attends a performance of Kabuki theatre. Branagh's prologue defines exactly the moment that Duke Frederick usurps his brother's kingdom, a moment that Shakespeare's play does not.

The epilogue interrupts the closing credits with Rosalind's speech, as the camera pans to see Rosalind's actor, Bryce Dallas Howard, walking to her dressing trailer on the film's location.

Despite the cultural transposition, Shakespeare's text and the names of his characters remain the same. The film closely follows Shakespeare's plot. Although some critics praised the setting, others found it useless and irrelevant since few of the characters were Japanese; most of the characters were European, as they were in the original play.

== Release ==
The film was released theatrically in Italy on 1 September 2006, in Greece on 7 September 2006, and in the UK on 21 September 2007.

In the United States, HBO began airing the film on TV on the evening of 21 August 2007, but it has never had a true theatrical release in the US, only occasional one-time showings, and most of these US showings took place after the film's television premiere. It is the only one of Branagh's Shakespeare films to be released directly to television instead of to theatres in the US.

The DVD was released in the US on 25 September 2007.

== Reception ==
Review aggregator website Rotten Tomatoes reports that 42% of 12 surveyed critics gave the film a positive review with an average rating of 4.7/10. Review aggregator Metacritic gave the film a rating of 75 out of 100 based on 15 reviews.

Philip French of The Observer called it less successful than Branagh's previous Shakespeare adaptations. Peter Bradshaw of The Guardian rated it 3/5 stars and wrote that it "deserves a look". Anthony Quinn of The Independent rated it 1/5 stars and wrote, "[T]he only way you could make the spiralling absurdities of As You Like It work would be to transform it into a fast-paced comedy". Many American critics called the film a "comeback" for Branagh's Shakespeare adaptations, which had reached what many considered a low point with Love's Labour's Lost. A negative US reviewer was film critic Stanley Kauffmann, who had admired Branagh's film versions of Henry V, Much Ado About Nothing, and Hamlet; he blasted the film, saying that he could barely get through it, and that, by giving it such an unusual setting, Branagh seemed to be trying to "apologize" to the viewing audience for the fact that As You Like It was a Shakespeare film. Critic Virginia Heffernan, writing for The New York Times, was also negative, pointing out that film reduces the role of main character Rosalind: "Mr. Branagh has teased out every manly rivalry and preserved every hey-nonny-nonny of the kooks in the Forest of Arden, but slashed passages of the repartee that defines Rosalind."

=== Accolades ===
At the 64th Golden Globes ceremony, Bryce Dallas Howard received a nomination in the category Best Actress – Television Series Musical or Comedy.

At the 14th Screen Actors Guild Awards ceremony, Kevin Kline won the award for Outstanding Actor in a Miniseries or Television Movie for his performance as Jaques.
