= Kenneth Branagh =

British actor and filmmaker (born 1960)

Sir Kenneth Branagh
- Branagh in 2026
- Born: Kenneth Charles Branagh; 10 December 1960 (age 65); Belfast, Northern Ireland
- Occupations: Actor; filmmaker
- Years active: 1981–present
- Works: Full list
- Spouses: Emma Thompson (m. 1989; div. 1997); Lindsay Brunnock (m. 2003)
- Partner(s): Helena Bonham Carter (1994–1999)
- Awards: Full list

Sir Kenneth Charles Branagh (/ˈbrænə/ BRAN-ə; born 10 December 1960) is a British actor and filmmaker. Born in Belfast and raised primarily in Reading, Branagh trained at Royal Academy of Dramatic Art in London and served as its president from 2015 to 2024. His accolades include an Academy Award, four BAFTAs, two Emmy Awards, a Golden Globe Award, and an Olivier Award. He was knighted in 2012, and was given Freedom of the City in his native Belfast in 2018. In 2020, he was ranked in 20th place on The Irish Times's list of Ireland's greatest film actors.

Branagh has directed and starred in several film adaptations of William Shakespeare's plays, including Henry V (1989), Much Ado About Nothing (1993), Othello (1995), Hamlet (1996), and As You Like It (2006). He was nominated for Academy Awards for Best Actor and Best Director for Henry V, and Best Adapted Screenplay for Hamlet. He directed Swan Song (1992), which earned a nomination for the Academy Award for Best Live Action Short Film. He also directed Dead Again (1991), Peter's Friends (1992), Mary Shelley's Frankenstein (1994), Thor (2011), and Cinderella (2015). For his semi-autobiographical film Belfast (2021), he was nominated for the Academy Awards for Best Picture and Best Director, and won Best Original Screenplay.

Branagh directed and starred as Hercule Poirot in the eponymous film series (2017–present). He has also acted in Celebrity (1998), Wild Wild West (1999), The Road to El Dorado (2000), Harry Potter and the Chamber of Secrets (2002), and Valkyrie (2008). His portrayal of Laurence Olivier in My Week with Marilyn (2011) earned him a nomination for the Academy Award for Best Supporting Actor. He played supporting roles in Christopher Nolan's films Dunkirk (2017), Tenet (2020), and Oppenheimer (2023).

Branagh has starred in the BBC1 series Fortunes of War (1987), the Channel 4 series Shackleton (2002), the television film Warm Springs (2005), and the BBC One series Wallander (2008–2016). He received a Primetime Emmy Award and an International Emmy Award for Best Actor for his portrayal of SS leader Reinhard Heydrich in the HBO film Conspiracy (2001).

== Early life and education ==
Kenneth Charles Branagh was born on 10 December 1960 in Belfast, the son of working class Protestant parents Frances (née Harper) and William Branagh. His father was a plumber and joiner who ran a company that specialised in fitting partitions and suspended ceilings. He is the middle of three children, with an older brother and a younger sister, and lived in the Tiger's Bay area of Belfast. He was educated at Grove Primary School. In early 1970, at the age of nine, Branagh moved with his family to England to escape the Troubles; they settled in Berkshire, where Branagh grew up in Reading and attended Whiteknights Primary School and Meadway School in Tilehurst. He appeared in school productions such as Toad of Toad Hall and Oh, What a Lovely War!

At school, Branagh learned to speak with an RP accent to avoid bullying. Discussing his identity, he later said, "I feel Irish. I don't think you can take Belfast out of the boy." He also attributes his "love of words" to his Irish heritage. He attended the amateur Reading Cine & Video Society (now called Reading Film & Video Makers) and was a keen member of Progress Theatre, of which he is now the patron. After disappointing A-level results in English, history, and sociology, he went on to train at the Royal Academy of Dramatic Art in London. In 1980, RADA's principal Hugh Cruttwell asked Branagh to perform a soliloquy from Hamlet for Queen Elizabeth II during one of her visits to the academy.

== Career ==
=== 1980–1988: Rise to prominence ===
Branagh has adapted numerous works of William Shakespeare for the stage and screen.

Branagh's first film appearance was as an uncredited role as a Cambridge student in the sports drama Chariots of Fire (1981). Branagh achieved early success in his native Northern Ireland for his role as Billy, the title character in the BBC's Play for Today trilogy known as the Billy Plays (1982–84), written by Graham Reid and set in Belfast. He received acclaim in the UK for his stage performances, first winning the 1982 SWET Award for Best Newcomer, for his role as Judd in Julian Mitchell's Another Country, after leaving RADA. Branagh was part of the new wave of actors to emerge from the academy. Others included Jonathan Pryce, Juliet Stevenson, Alan Rickman, Anton Lesser, Bruce Payne and Fiona Shaw. In 1984, he appeared in the Royal Shakespeare Company production of Henry V, directed by Adrian Noble. The production played to sold-out audiences, especially at the Barbican in the City of London. It was this production that he adapted for the film version of the play in 1989. He and David Parfitt founded the Renaissance Theatre Company in 1987, following success with several productions on the London Fringe, including Branagh's full-scale production of Romeo and Juliet at the Lyric Studio, co-starring with Samantha Bond.

The first major Renaissance production was Branagh's Christmas 1987 staging of Twelfth Night at Riverside Studios in Hammersmith, starring Richard Briers as Malvolio and Frances Barber as Viola, and with an original score by actor, musician, and composer Patrick Doyle, who two years later was to compose the music for Branagh's film adaptation of Henry V. This Twelfth Night was later adapted for television. The company's debut season also included Public Enemy, a play written by Branagh set in his native Belfast. Also in 1987, Branagh found his first leading film role as James Moon in the British film adaptation of J.L. Carr's book A Month in The Country. Here he plays a homosexual ex-army officer who, following the war, has taken on a job to excavate a burial in the churchyard. He instead spends most of his time looking for Saxon treasures. The film is set in a 1920s rural Yorkshire village, where Branagh’s character meets a character played by Colin Firth, also in his first major role.

Branagh became a major presence in the media and on the British stage when Renaissance collaborated with Birmingham Rep for a 1988 touring season of three Shakespeare plays under the umbrella title of Renaissance Shakespeare on the Road, which also played a repertory season at the Phoenix Theatre in London. It featured directorial debuts for Judi Dench with Much Ado About Nothing (starring Branagh and Samantha Bond as Benedick and Beatrice), Geraldine McEwan with As You Like It, and Derek Jacobi directing Branagh in the title role in Hamlet, with Sophie Thompson as Ophelia. Critic Milton Shulman of the London Evening Standard wrote: "On the positive side Branagh has the vitality of Olivier, the passion of Gielgud, the assurance of Guinness, to mention but three famous actors who have essayed the role. On the negative side, he has not got the magnetism of Olivier, nor the mellifluous voice quality of Gielgud nor the intelligence of Guinness."

=== 1989–1999: Breakthrough ===
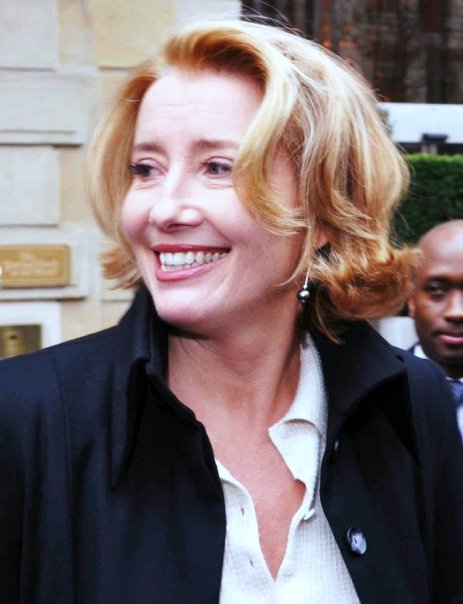
Branagh starred in numerous films and stage plays with Emma Thompson

A year later, in 1989, Branagh co-starred with Emma Thompson in the Renaissance company's stage revival of Look Back in Anger. Judi Dench directed both the theatre and television productions, presented first in Belfast then at the London Coliseum and Lyric Theatre. In 1990, he wrote his autobiography Beginning, recounting his life and acting career up to that point. In the book's introduction, he admits that the main reason for producing the book was "money" and that "The deal was made, and a handsome advance was paid out. The advance provided the funds to buy accommodation for the Company's offices, this moving Renaissance out of my flat and bringing me a little closer to sanity."

Notable non-Shakespeare films in which Branagh has acted in and directed include the neo-noir romantic thriller Dead Again (1991) starring Branagh, Emma Thompson, Andy Garcia, and Derek Jacobi. The film premiered at the Berlin International Film Festival where it competed for the Golden Bear and received critical acclaim. The following year he directed the British comedy-drama film Peter's Friends, with a cast including former student friends Emma Thompson, Hugh Laurie, Tony Slattery, and Stephen Fry, as well as Imelda Staunton and Rita Rudner. The film received positive reviews with critics comparing it favourably as the British version of The Big Chill (1982). The film earned two Evening Standard British Film Awards for Branagh and Thompson.

Branagh is known for his film adaptations of William Shakespeare, beginning with the critically acclaimed Henry V (1989), later followed by Shakespeare's romantic comedy Much Ado About Nothing (1993). The latter film premiered at the 1993 Cannes Film Festival where it competed for the Palme d'Or. The film starred Branagh, Thompson, Denzel Washington, Kate Beckinsale, Keanu Reeves, and Michael Keaton. Vincent Canby film critic of The New York Times praised Branagh's direction writing, "Now he has accomplished something equally difficult. He has taken a Shakespearean romantic comedy, the sort of thing that usually turns to mush on the screen, and made a movie that is triumphantly romantic, comic and, most surprising of all, emotionally alive."

However, Branagh had a commercial misstep with his adaptation of the horror film Mary Shelley's Frankenstein (1994). The film starred Branagh, Robert De Niro, Helena Bonham Carter, Tom Hulce, and Ian Holm. It premiered at the London Film Festival where it received negative reviews. The New York Times film critic Janet Maslin wrote of Branagh's failure, "[He] is in over his head. He displays neither the technical finesse to handle a big, visually ambitious film nor the insight to develop a stirring new version of this story. Instead, this is a bland, no-fault Frankenstein for the '90s, short on villainy but loaded with the tragically misunderstood". He then directed the minor British romantic comedy In the Bleak Midwinter (1995) to positive reviews.

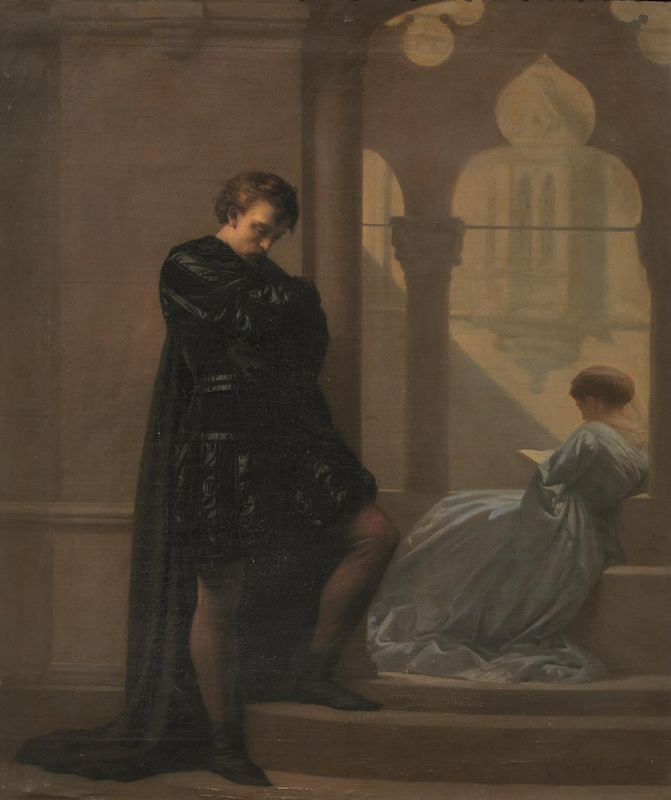
Branagh starred as and directed the film Hamlet (1996)

Also in 1995, Branagh portrayed Iago in Oliver Parker's Othello (1995) acting opposite Laurence Fishburne as Othello. The film received largely positive reviews, particularly for Branagh's performance which earned a Screen Actors Guild Award for Outstanding Performance by a Male Actor in a Supporting Role nomination. Janet Maslin of The New York Times praised his acting writing, "Mr Branagh's superb performance, as the man whose Machiavellian scheming guides the story of Othello's downfall, guarantees this film an immediacy that any audience will understand."

Branagh returned to directing, in the acclaimed adaptation of Hamlet (1996). The film is noted for its epic scale and cast. The film ran four hours and was shot completely in 70 mm film. The cast includes Branagh, Kate Winslet, Derek Jacobi, Julie Christie and Rufus Sewell. Critic Roger Ebert of The Chicago Sun-Times praised Branagh's direction and acting, declaring, "One of the tasks of a lifetime is to become familiar with the great plays of Shakespeare. 'Hamlet' is the most opaque. Branagh's version moved me, entertained me and made me feel for the first time at home in that doomed royal court." The film received four Academy Award nominations including for Best Adapted Screenplay for Branagh.

Post-Hamlet, Branagh took a break from directing choosing to act in films directed by auteur directors. He starred in Robert Altman's legal thriller The Gingerbread Man (1998), Paul Greengrass' dramedy The Theory of Flight (1998) and Woody Allen's celebrity satire Celebrity (1998). The following year he starred in the Western film Wild Wild West opposite Will Smith, Kevin Kline, and Salma Hayek, which received negative reviews. During this time Branagh took on voice roles playing the title role in BBC radio broadcasts of Hamlet and Cyrano de Bergerac, and the role of Edmund in King Lear. Branagh has narrated several audiobooks, such as The Magician's Nephew by C. S. Lewis and Heart of Darkness by Joseph Conrad. In 1998, he narrated the 24-episode documentary series Cold War. Branagh also narrated the BBC documentaries Walking with Dinosaurs, World War I in Colour, Walking with Beasts and Walking with Monsters, and the BBC miniseries Great Composers.

=== 2000–2010: Established director ===
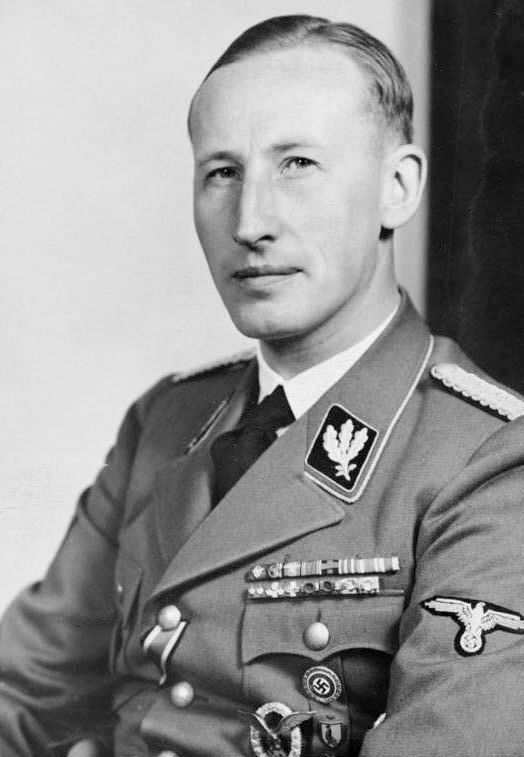
Branagh won the Emmy Award for his portrayal of Reinhard Heydrich in Conspiracy (2001)

Branagh found commercial and critical failure with Love's Labour's Lost, which paused his directorial career. That same year he voiced Miguel in the DreamWorks Animated film The Road to El Dorado (2000) alongside Kevin Kline. The film received mixed reviews but has since gained a cult following. The following year he acted in the HBO film Conspiracy (2001) portraying SS-Obergruppenführer Reinhard Heydrich. The film is a depiction of the Wannsee Conference, where Nazi officials decided on the Final Solution. Branagh acted alongside Colin Firth and Stanley Tucci. He earned critical acclaim for his performance as well as the Primetime Emmy Award for Outstanding Lead Actor in a Limited or Anthology Series or Movie.

In 2002, Branagh played A. O. Neville in the drama film Rabbit-Proof Fence and portrayed a humorous role as Professor Gilderoy Lockhart in the film adaptation of J.K. Rowling's Harry Potter and the Chamber of Secrets. He also portrayed Sir Ernest Shackleton in the Channel 4 television film Shackleton (2002). The film is a dramatisation of the 1914 Imperial Trans-Antarctic Expedition's battle for survival, for which he was nominated for a BAFTA award and an Emmy. That same year Branagh starred at the Crucible Theatre, Sheffield as Richard III. In 2003, he starred in the Royal National Theatre's production of David Mamet's Edmond. Branagh directed The Play What I Wrote in England in 2001 and directed a Broadway production in 2003.

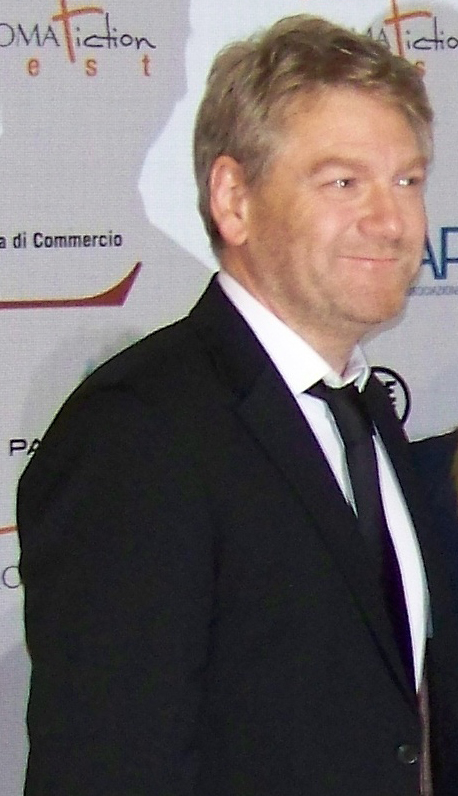
Branagh won the Roma Fiction Festival's Lifetime Achievement Award (2009)

Branagh has been involved in several made-for-TV films. Among his most acclaimed portrayals is that of US President Franklin D. Roosevelt in the film Warm Springs (2005), for which he received an Primetime Emmy Award for Outstanding Lead Actor in a Limited Series or Movie nomination. The film received 16 Emmy nominations, winning five (including Outstanding Made for Television Movie); Branagh did not win the award for his portrayal. In 2006, Branagh directed the film version of As You Like It starring Romola Garai, Bryce Dallas Howard, and Kevin Kline. That same year he also directed a film version of Mozart's opera The Magic Flute. Branagh has also directed the thriller Sleuth (2007), a remake of the 1972 film starring Jude Law and Michael Caine. The film received mixed reviews with critics praising the performances and noting Branagh's darker interpretation of the material. Branagh then took the role of Major General Henning von Tresckow in Valkyrie (2008) and played the Minister, Dormandy (a parody of PMG Tony Benn), in the film The Boat That Rocked (2009).

Branagh is the star of the English-language Wallander television series, adaptations of Henning Mankell's best-selling Wallander crime novels. Branagh plays the eponymous Inspector Kurt Wallander and also serves as the executive producer of the series. The first series of three episodes was broadcast on BBC One in November and December 2008. Branagh won the award for best actor at the 35th Broadcasting Press Guild Television and Radio Awards (2009). It was his first major television award win in the UK. He received his first BAFTA TV on 26 April 2009 for the British Academy Television Award for Best Drama Series. For his performance in the episode One Step Behind, he was nominated in the Outstanding Actor, Miniseries, or Movie category of the 61st Primetime Emmy Awards. The role also gained him a nomination for Best Actor at the 2009 Crime Thriller Awards. The second Wallander series of three episodes aired initially in January 2010 on the BBC, and the third season aired in July 2012. The fourth and final series was shot from October 2014 to January 2015 and premiered on German TV, dubbed into German, in December 2015; it aired in the UK, with its original English soundtrack, in May and June 2016.

From September to November 2008, Branagh appeared at Wyndham's Theatre as the title character in the Donmar West End revival of Anton Chekhov's Ivanov in a new version by Tom Stoppard. His performance was lauded as the "performance of the year" by several critics. It won him the Critics' Circle Theatre Award for Best Male Performance but did not get him a Laurence Olivier Award nomination, to the surprise of critics.

=== 2011–2020: Career expansion ===
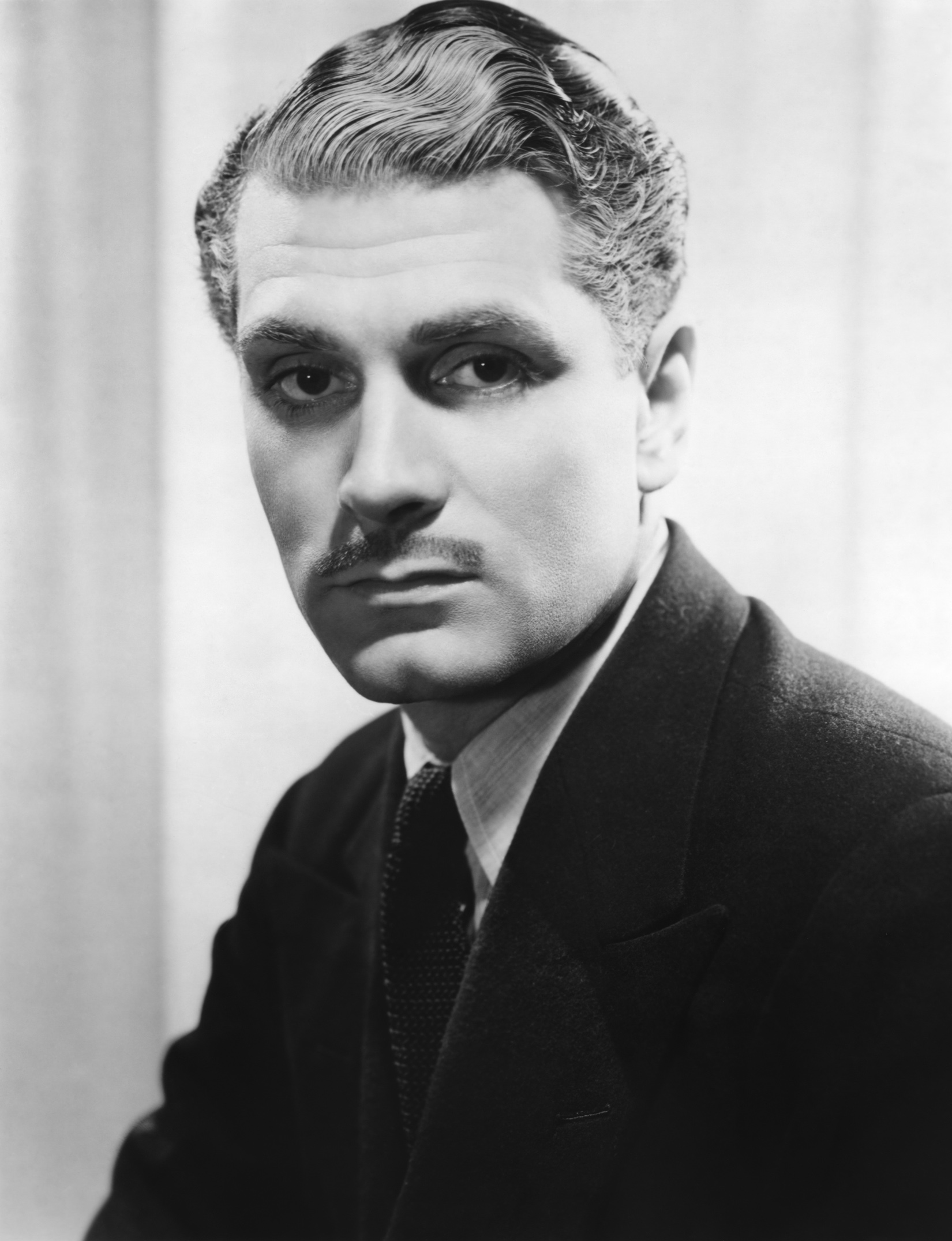
Branagh portrayed Laurence Olivier in the film My Week with Marilyn (2011)

In 2011, Branagh directed Thor, a film based on the Marvel superhero. Thor, Branagh's return to big-budget directing, was wide-released on 6 May 2011. The film was a part of Phase One of the Marvel Cinematic Universe. It starred Chris Hemsworth, Natalie Portman, Tom Hiddleston, and Anthony Hopkins. The film was a financial and critical success. That same year he portrayed Laurence Olivier in My Week with Marilyn (2011). Peter Bradshaw of The Guardian praised Branagh's performance writing, "It is a complete joy to see Branagh's Olivier erupt in queeny frustration at Marilyn's lateness, space-cadet vagueness, and preposterous Method acting indulgence...[He] revives Olivier with wit, intelligence and charm". Branagh received an Academy Award for Best Supporting Actor nomination at the 84th Academy Awards losing to Christopher Plummer for Beginners (2011).

Branagh participated in the 2012 Summer Olympics opening ceremony portraying Isambard Kingdom Brunel during the Industrial Revolution segment "Pandemonium" where he performed one of Caliban's speeches (Note: Act III, Scene 2) from Shakespeare's The Tempest. In July 2013, he co-directed Macbeth at Manchester International Festival with Rob Ashford. With Branagh in the title role, Alex Kingston played Lady Macbeth and Ray Fearon featured as Macduff. The final performance of the completely sold-out run was broadcast to cinemas on 20 July as part of National Theatre Live. He repeated his performance and directorial duties opposite Ashford and Kingston when the production moved to New York City's Park Avenue Armory in June 2014.

In April 2015, Branagh announced his formation of the Kenneth Branagh Theatre Company, in which he would appear as actor-manager. With the company, he announced he would present a season of five shows at London's Garrick Theatre from October 2015 – November 2016. The shows were The Winter's Tale, a double bill of Harlequinade and All On Her Own, Red Velvet, The Painkiller, Romeo and Juliet and The Entertainer. Branagh directed all but The Entertainer, in which he starred. Branagh also starred in The Winter's Tale, Harlequinade and The Painkiller. Kenneth Branagh Theatre Company also includes Judi Dench (The Winter's Tale), Zoë Wanamaker (Harlequinade/All On Her Own), Derek Jacobi, Lily James and Richard Madden (Romeo and Juliet) and Rob Brydon (The Painkiller). In September 2015, it was announced that The Winter's Tale, Romeo and Juliet, and The Entertainer would be broadcast in cinemas, in partnership with Picturehouse Entertainment.

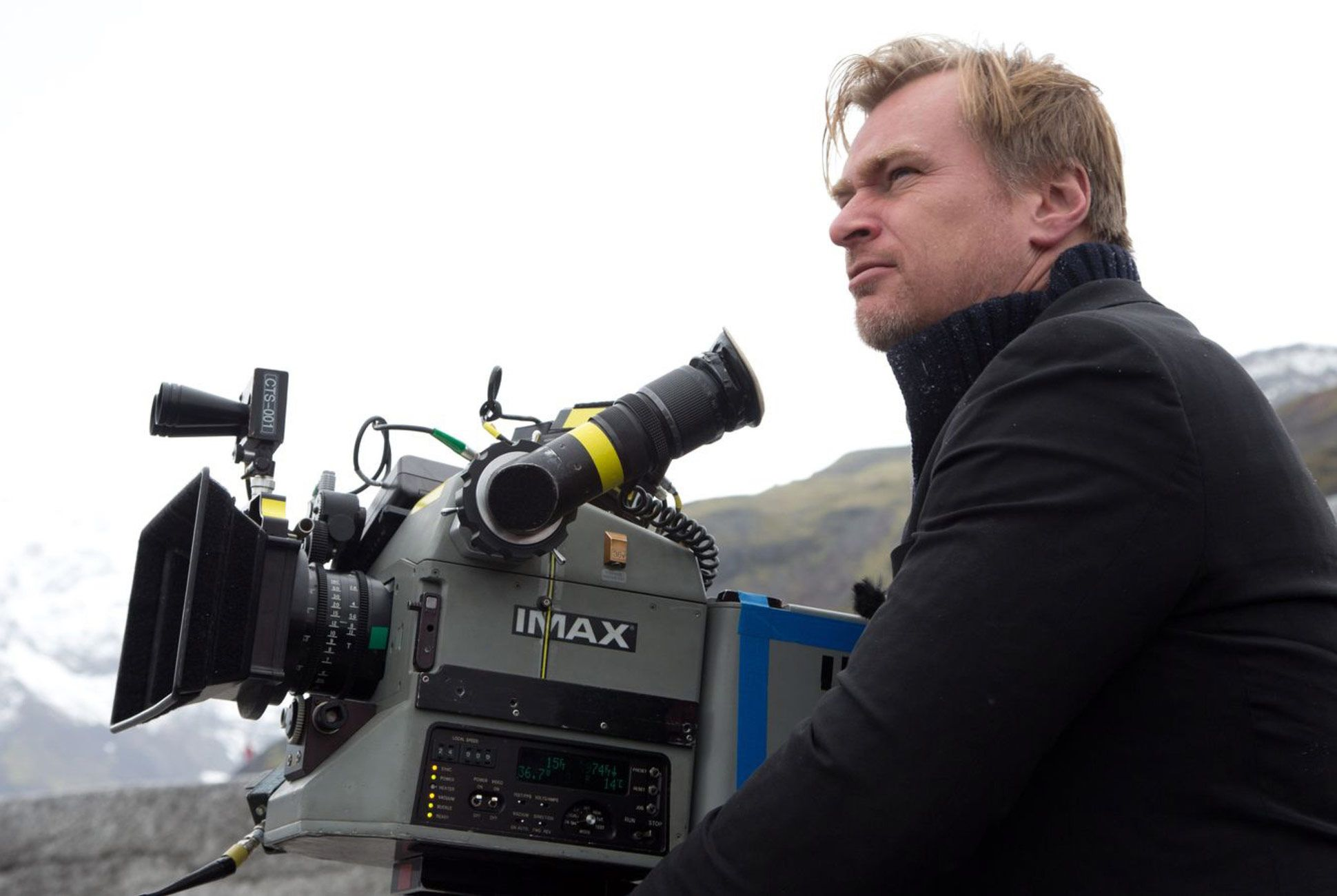
Kenneth Branagh has acted in three of Christopher Nolan's films: Dunkirk (2017), Tenet (2020), and Oppenheimer (2023)

In 2014 Branagh directed and acted in the action thriller Jack Ryan: Shadow Recruit (2014) starring Chris Pine, Keira Knightley, and Kevin Costner. The film was a box office hit but received mixed reviews from critics. The following year, Branagh directed Disney's live-action adaptation of Cinderella (2015) starring Lily James. The film was a financial and critical success. Peter Debruge of Variety praised his direction writing, "the underlying property emerges untarnished, as director Kenneth Branagh reverently reimagines Charles Perrault’s fairy tale for a new generation the world over, spelling countless opportunities to exploit fresh interest in the story throughout the Disney universe."

Branagh started his first collaboration with Christopher Nolan portraying a Royal Navy Commander in the World War II action-thriller Dunkirk (2017), based on the British military evacuation of the French city of Dunkirk in 1940. Branagh starred alongside Cillian Murphy, Mark Rylance, and Tom Hardy. The film received critical acclaim and was nominated for eight Academy Awards including Best Picture. That same year Branagh directed and starred in a film adaptation of Agatha Christie's detective novel Murder on the Orient Express (2017) as Hercule Poirot. Production began in London in November 2016. Like Branagh's Hamlet in 1996, it is among the very few to use 65mm film cameras since 1970.

In 2018, he directed the film All Is True, in which he starred as William Shakespeare. Branagh also directed the fantasy adventure film Artemis Fowl, which was released on Disney+ in June 2020. In May 2019, Branagh was cast in Christopher Nolan's Tenet (2020) in which he portrayed the villain Andrei Sator and was praised for his performance. Branagh acted alongside Robert Pattinson, John David Washington, and Elizabeth Debicki.

=== 2021–present ===
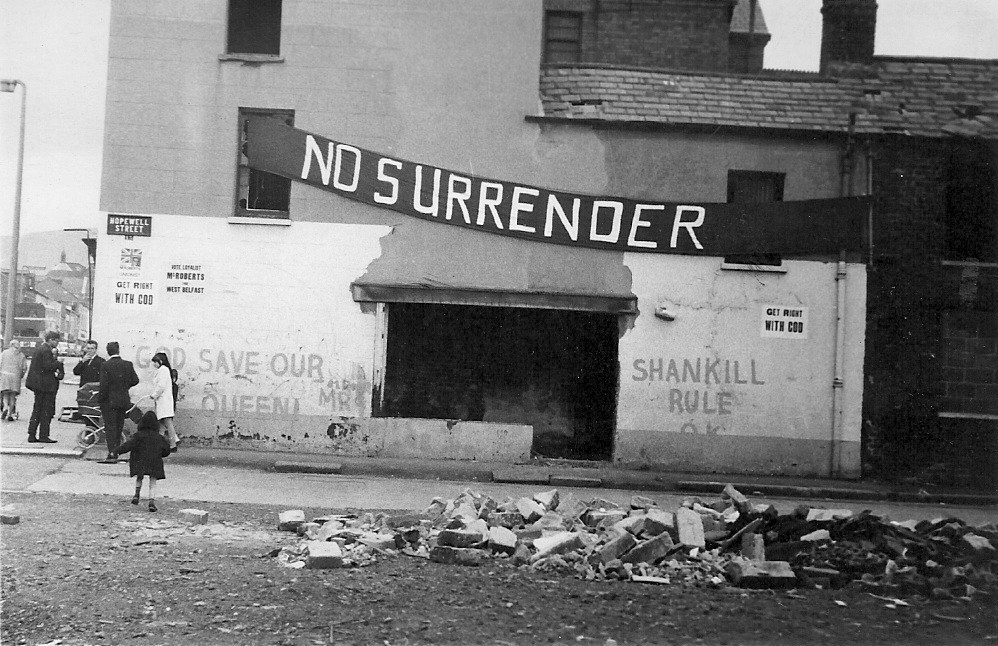
Shankill Road, Belfast during the Troubles, 1970s

In 2021, Branagh directed the semi-autobiographical film Belfast starring Jude Hill, Catriona Balfe, Jamie Dornan, Ciarán Hinds, and Judi Dench. In the film, Branagh explores his childhood in Northern Ireland during a period of intense religious and political conflict. The film was shot in black-and-white with flickers of colour images. The film was shown both at the Telluride Film Festival and the Toronto International Film Festival where it won the People's Choice Award for the latter. The film was acclaimed by critics with Peter Bradshaw of The Guardian writing, "There is a terrific warmth and tenderness to Branagh’s elegiac, autobiographical movie about the Belfast of his childhood: spryly written, beautifully acted and shot in a lustrous monochrome, with set pieces, madeleines and epiphanies that feel like a more emollient version of Terence Davies." Stephen Farber of The Hollywood Reporter noted, "[While] Branagh’s most personal film is imperfect, the emotion that it builds in the final section, as the family plays out a wrenching universal drama of emigration, is searing". The film earned seven Academy Award nominations including for Best Picture and Best Director. Branagh won the Academy Award for Best Original Screenplay. He also won the BAFTA Award for Outstanding British Film.

He reprised his role as Hercule Poirot in 2022's Death on the Nile, a sequel to Murder on the Orient Express which he also directed. In March 2021, Branagh signed on to direct a biopic of music group the Bee Gees. In March 2022, it was revealed that Branagh left the project due to scheduling conflicts and was replaced by John Carney. In October 2022, it was announced that Branagh would direct and star in a third Poirot film titled A Haunting in Venice, based on Christie's Hallowe'en Party. Branagh reunited with Christopher Nolan, portraying the Danish physicist Niels Bohr in the war epic Oppenheimer (2023). That same year Branagh returned to the West End stage directing and acting in the title role in a stage adaptation of William Shakespeare's King Lear at the Wyndham's Theatre in London. Arifa Akbar of The Guardian wrote of the production: "although Branagh delivers his Lear with slick, almost playful efficiency, it is not his towering achievement". The production is set to have an Off-Broadway transfer at The Shed in the Fall of 2024. In May 2024, it was announced Branagh would write and direct the psychological thriller film The Last Disturbance of Madeline Hynde, starring Jodie Comer; the film is expected to enter production in August 2024. In June 2025 it was reported that Branagh will play the husband of Miranda Priestly, played by Meryl Streep, in The Devil Wears Prada 2, which was released in 2026. In September 2025, it was announced Branagh would return to the Royal Shakespeare Company for two plays in 2026, playing Prospero in The Tempest and Lopakhin in The Cherry Orchard.

== Personal life ==
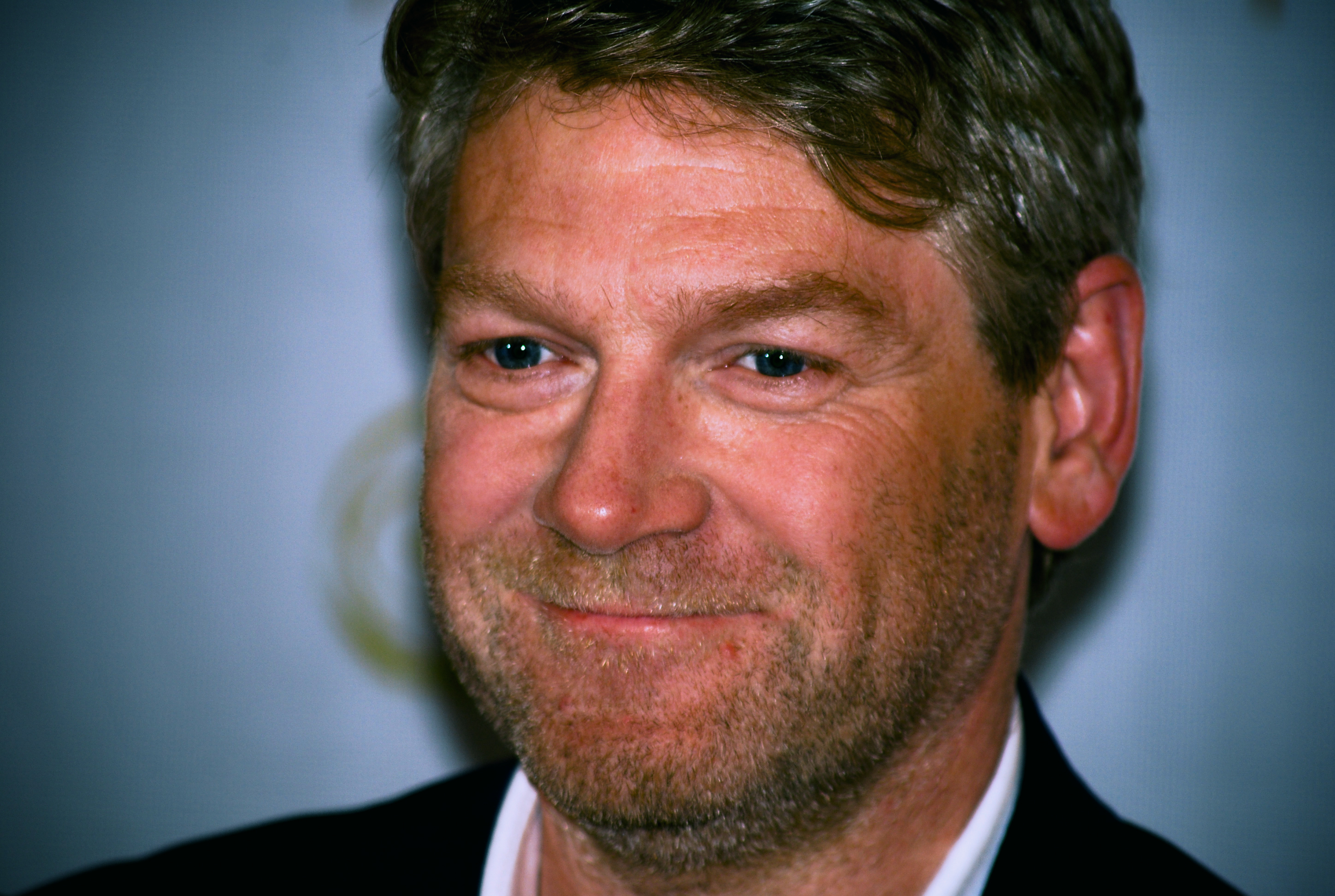
Branagh at Roma Fiction Fest in 2009

In 1989, Branagh married English actress Emma Thompson, who appeared with him in Fortunes of War, Look Back in Anger, Henry V, Much Ado About Nothing, Dead Again, and Peter's Friends.

During their marriage, while directing and starring in Mary Shelley's Frankenstein (1994), he began an affair with his co-star Helena Bonham Carter. Thompson divorced him in 1997, and he and Bonham Carter were in a well-publicised relationship until 1999.

In 2003, he married film art director Lindsay Brunnock, whom he met during the shooting of Shackleton in 2002.

Branagh considers himself Irish. He has said that he became "much more religious" after listening to Laurence Olivier's dramatic reading of the Bible every morning in preparation for his role as Olivier in My Week with Marilyn.

Branagh is a supporter of the Tottenham Hotspur football club.

== Works and performances ==
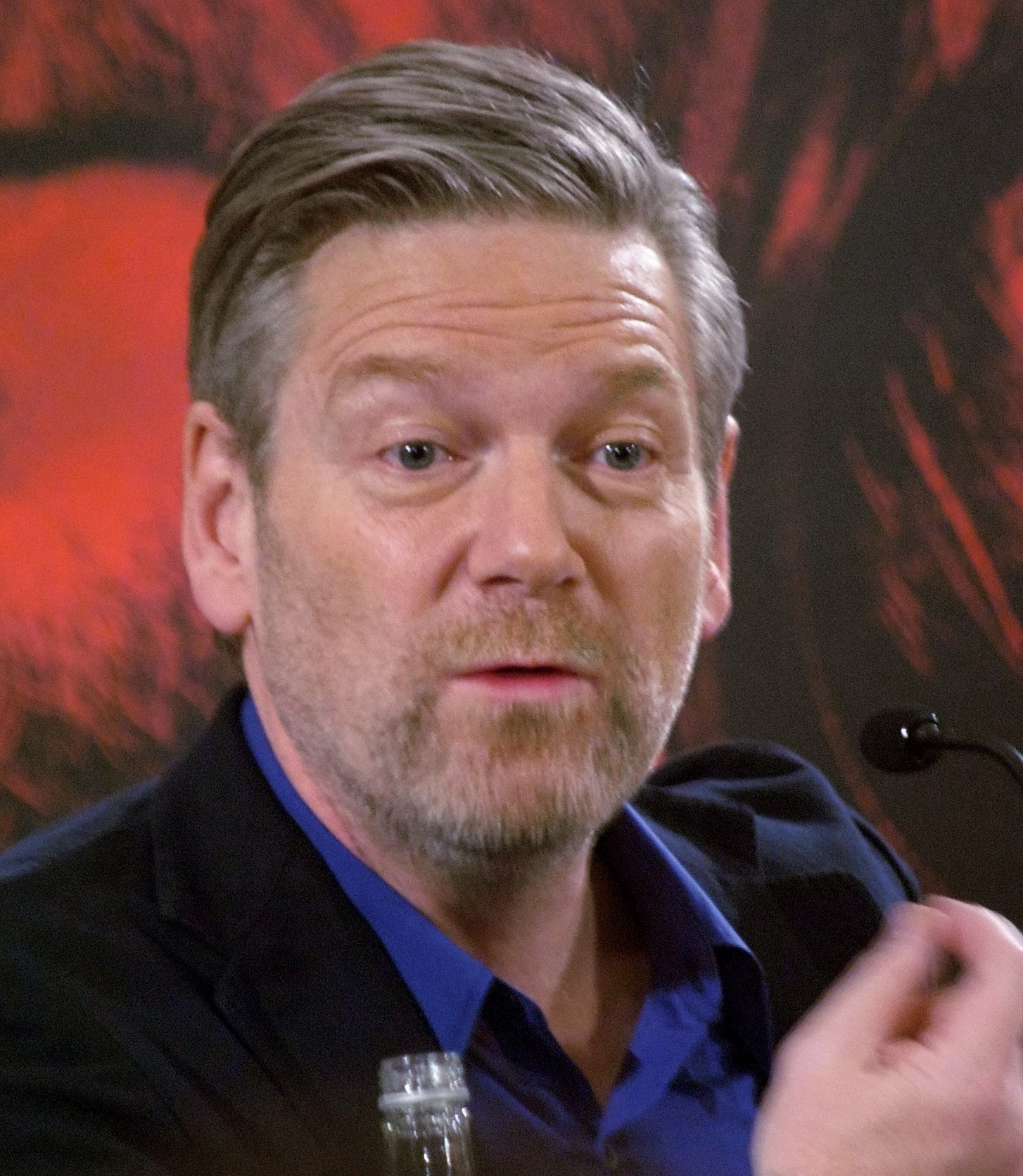
Kenneth Branagh in London in 2011

Directed features
| Year | Title | Distributor |
|---|---|---|
| 1989 | Henry V | Curzon Film Distributors |
| 1991 | Dead Again | Paramount Pictures |
| 1992 | Peter's Friends | Entertainment Film Distributors |
| 1993 | Much Ado About Nothing | The Samuel Goldwyn Company/Entertainment Film Distributors |
| 1994 | Mary Shelley's Frankenstein | TriStar Pictures |
| 1995 | In the Bleak Midwinter | Rank-Castle Rock/Turner |
| 1996 | Hamlet | Rank-Castle Rock/Turner / Columbia Pictures |
| 2000 | Love's Labour's Lost | Pathé Distribution |
| 2006 | As You Like It | Lionsgate/Picturehouse |
| 2006 | The Magic Flute | Revolver Entertainment/Les Films du Losange |
| 2007 | Sleuth | Sony Pictures Classics/Paramount Pictures |
| 2011 | Thor | Paramount Pictures |
| 2014 | Jack Ryan: Shadow Recruit | Paramount Pictures |
| 2015 | Cinderella | Walt Disney Studios Motion Pictures |
| 2017 | Murder on the Orient Express | 20th Century Fox |
| 2018 | All Is True | Sony Pictures Classics |
| 2020 | Artemis Fowl | Walt Disney Studios Motion Pictures |
| 2021 | Belfast | Focus Features/Universal Pictures |
| 2022 | Death on the Nile | 20th Century Studios |
| 2023 | A Haunting in Venice | 20th Century Studios |
| TBA | The Last Disturbance of Madeline Hynde | TBA |

== Awards and honours ==
Branagh has been nominated for eight Academy Awards and was the first individual to be nominated in seven different categories. His first two nominations were for Henry V (one each for directing and acting). He also received similar BAFTA Award nominations for his film work, winning one for his direction. His first BAFTA TV award came in April 2009, for Best Drama Series (Wallander). Branagh received two other Academy Award nominations for the 1992 film short subject Swan Song and for his work on the screenplay of Hamlet in 1996. His 5th nomination came for his portrayal of Laurence Olivier in My Week With Marilyn in 2012. This was followed by three nominations in 2022 for Belfast – his first nominations for Original Screenplay and Best Picture, winning for Original Screenplay. He thereby set the record for the most unique Academy Award categories to be nominated for with seven, surpassing Walt Disney, George Clooney, and Alfonso Cuarón, each of whom had received nominations in six categories (Cuarón equalled Branagh the year after).

He is Honorary President of NICVA (the Northern Ireland Council for Voluntary Action). He received an honorary Doctorate in Literature from Queen's University of Belfast in 1990. He is also a patron for the charity Over The Wall. He has also served on the Board of Governors of the British Film Institute. Branagh was the youngest actor to receive the Golden Quill (also known as the Gielgud Award) in 2000. In 2001, he was appointed an honorary Doctor of Literature at the Shakespeare Institute of The University of Birmingham; the Shakespeare Institute Library keeps the archive of his Renaissance Theatre Company and Renaissance Films.

On 10 July 2009, Branagh was presented with the Lifetime Achievement Award at the RomaFictionFest. He was also listed on the Radio Times's TV 100 power list in 2023.

He was appointed a Knight Bachelor in the 2012 Birthday Honours for services to drama and to the community in Northern Ireland. He received the accolade at Buckingham Palace on 9 November 2012; afterwards, Branagh told a BBC reporter that he felt "humble, elated, and incredibly lucky" to be knighted.

In October 2015, it was announced that Branagh would be the new President of the Royal Academy of Dramatic Art (RADA), succeeding the late Richard, Lord Attenborough. As the President of RADA and one of the highest profile actors and filmmakers in contemporary British popular culture, Branagh appeared on Debrett's 2017 list of the most influential people in the UK. In October 2017, it was announced that Branagh would be conferred with the Freedom of the City of Belfast. The honour was officially conferred on him by the Lord Mayor of Belfast, Councillor Nuala McAllister, at a ceremony in the Ulster Hall in Belfast on 30 January 2018. He was awarded the Freedom of the Town of Stratford-upon-Avon on 22 April 2022. Branagh stepped down as president of RADA in February 2024 and was succeeded by David Harewood.

Awards and nominations received by films directed by Branagh
| Year | Title | Academy Awards | | BAFTA Awards | | Golden Globe Awards | |
| Year | Title | Nominations | Wins | Nominations | Wins | Nominations | Wins |
|---|---|---|---|---|---|---|---|
| 1989 | Henry V | 3 | 1 | 6 | 1 | | |
| 1991 | Dead Again | | | 1 | | 1 | |
| 1993 | Much Ado About Nothing | | | 1 | | 1 | |
| 1994 | Mary Shelley's Frankenstein | 1 | | 1 | | | |
| 1996 | Hamlet | 4 | | 2 | | | |
| 2006 | As You Like It | | | | | 1 | |
| 2015 | Cinderella | 1 | | 1 | | | |
| 2021 | Belfast | 7 | 1 | 6 | 1 | 7 | 1 |
| Total | | 16 | 2 | 18 | 2 | 10 | 1 |

== Discography ==
- Shakespeare's Richard III (complete) for Naxos Audiobooks
- In the Ravine & Other Short Stories by Anton Chekhov (unabridged) for Naxos Audiobooks
- Felix Mendelssohn's incidental music for A Midsummer Night's Dream (speaker) live recording for Sony Classical, conducted by Claudio Abbado
- The Diary of Samuel Pepys 1660–1669 (abridged) for Hodder Headline Audio Classics
- The Magician's Nephew by C.S. Lewis for Harper Books
- Shakespeare's "Sonnet 30" for the 2002 compilation album, When Love Speaks (EMI Classics)
- Mary Shelley's Frankenstein [Abridged]
- Joseph Conrad's Heart of Darkness for Audible.com.
- "The Duck and the Kangaroo", read for Fairy Tales, an album of poems and music for children (orchidclassics.com)

== See also ==
- List of Academy Award winners and nominees from Great Britain
- List of actors with Academy Award nominations
- List of oldest and youngest Academy Award winners and nominees — Youngest nominees for Best Director
- List of International Emmy Award winners
- List of Primetime Emmy Award winners

Media offices
| Preceded by The Lord Attenborough | President of the Royal Academy of Dramatic Art; 2015–2024 | Incumbent |
