= Love's Labour's Lost (film) =

2000 film directed by Kenneth Branagh

- Theatrical release poster
- Directed by: Kenneth Branagh
- Based on: Love's Labour's Lost by William Shakespeare
- Produced by: David Barron; Kenneth Branagh
- Starring: Kenneth Branagh; Nathan Lane; Adrian Lester; Matthew Lillard; Natascha McElhone; Alessandro Nivola; Alicia Silverstone; Timothy Spall
- Cinematography: Alex Thomson
- Edited by: Neil Farrell
- Music by: Patrick Doyle
- Production companies: Miramax Films; Intermedia; Le Studio Canal+ Shepperton Studios; The Shakespeare Film Company
- Distributed by: Pathé Distribution
- Release dates: 17 July 2000 (Berlinale); 31 March 2000 (United Kingdom)
- Running time: 93 minutes
- Country: United Kingdom
- Language: English
- Budget: $13 million
- Box office: $500,000 (UK/US)

Love's Labour's Lost is a 2000 British musical romantic comedy film written, directed by and starring Kenneth Branagh, based on the comic play of the same name by William Shakespeare. The first feature film to be made of this lesser-known comedy, Branagh's fourth film of a Shakespeare play was a box-office and critical disappointment.

The cast includes Shakespearean veterans such as Timothy Spall, Richard Briers and Geraldine McEwan, alongside Hollywood actors Alicia Silverstone and Matthew Lillard and Broadway and West End stars such as Nathan Lane and Jimmy Yuill.

As a result of its poor commercial performance, Miramax shelved its three-picture deal with Branagh, who subsequently returned to Shakespeare with As You Like It in 2006.

== Plot ==
The King of Navarre has vowed to avoid romantic entanglements to spend three years in study and contemplation. His chief courtiers agree to follow him in this vow, though one (Berowne) argues that they will not be able to fulfill this plan.

Berowne's claim is proven correct almost instantly. The Princess of France comes to Navarre to discuss the status of the province of Aquitaine. Though the King does not grant them access to his palace (they are forced to camp outside), each of the courtiers falls in love with one of her handmaidens, and the King falls in love with the Princess herself.

The men attempt to hide their own loves and expose those of their fellows. After a masked ball in which the pairs of lovers are comically mismatched, all the amours are revealed. Costard leads a musical number with the King's court, which eventually includes the entire cast. But as the song closes, a messenger arrives with news of the King of France's death. As the year of mourning that will proceed for the princess and her ladies means further courtship is impossible, and the women had until this point treated the men's courtship as nothing but a mocking merriment to entertain their guests, they request demonstrations of humility and constancy from the men, with a promise to marry them at the end of the 12 months if they carry out these acts.

Newsreel footage shows the character's lives over the course of that year, which takes place in the context of World War II. The montage ends with all those who survived the war (Boyet we specifically see die in some covert military action) reuniting in celebration on what appears to be VE Day.

The comic underplot of the original play, in which Costard and others attempt to stage a play (rather like that of the rude mechanicals in A Midsummer Night's Dream) is severely curtailed, as is the boasting of the Spaniard, Don Armado.

== Cast ==
Some of the characters in the film adaptation are not in the original script. Gaston, Isabelle, Eugene, Jaques, Beatrice, Hyppolyte, Celimene, and Sophie are not mentioned in the play, and they have no lines in the film. This, however, is a standard feature of Branagh's Shakespeare adaptations; his Hamlet contains many non-speaking walk-on roles that are not included in the original play, but are mentioned in the cast list.

- Alessandro Nivola as King Ferdinand of Navarre
- Alicia Silverstone as The Princess of France
- Natascha McElhone as Rosaline
- Kenneth Branagh as Berowne
- Carmen Ejogo as Maria
- Matthew Lillard as Longaville
- Adrian Lester as Dumaine
- Emily Mortimer as Katherine
- Richard Briers as Nathaniel
- Geraldine McEwan as Holofernia (a female version of the male Holofernes in the original play)
- Stefania Rocca as Jaquenetta
- Jimmy Yuill as Dull
- Nathan Lane as Costard
- Timothy Spall as Don Armado
- Tony O'Donnell as Moth
- Daniel Hill as Marcade
- Richard Clifford as Boyet

== Production ==
Branagh became interested in the play during his 1984 season with the Royal Shakespeare Company, when he had played the King of Navarre. From that period, he was familiar with Harley Granville-Barker's famous essay arguing that Love's Labour's Lost could be treated as highly stylised, with the dialogue and action treated with an almost musical sense of rhythm. Branagh took this insight a step further and turned the play into a musical, going much further in his adaptation of the play than he had ever done in his Shakespeare films, and risking the alienation of both audiences and serious critics. This decision also allowed him to revisit the Hollywood film musicals he had loved in his youth.

Branagh cast the film without much regard for singing or dancing ability; as in Woody Allen's Everyone Says I Love You, the film was meant to highlight energy and enthusiasm rather than smooth competence. Of the cast, only Nathan Lane was known primarily for musical work. Preproduction was dominated by rigorous dancing and singing coaching.

Branagh reversed the philosophy he had used with Hamlet (that is, to keep every word of the original), and instead made major cuts in the play's text. The released version retains only about a quarter of Shakespeare's lines; although Branagh managed to include all seventeen of the original speaking roles, some (most notably among the lower-class characters) are cut almost to nothing.

== Music ==
In adapting the play to a musical, numerous songs primarily from the 1930s were featured, often in place of much dialogue. They include:

- I'd Rather Charleston (George Gershwin/Desmond Carter)
- I Get a Kick Out of You (Cole Porter)
- I Won't Dance (Jerome Kern/Dorothy Fields)
- No Strings (I'm Fancy Free) (Irving Berlin)
- The Way You Look Tonight (Jerome Kern/Dorothy Fields)
- I've Got a Crush on You (George Gershwin/Ira Gershwin)
- Cheek to Cheek (Irving Berlin)
- Let's Face the Music and Dance (Irving Berlin)
- There's No Business Like Show Business (Irving Berlin)
- They Can't Take That Away From Me (George Gershwin/Ira Gershwin)

== Release ==
=== Critical reception ===
Love's Labour's Lost was met with a mixed reception from critics. It currently holds a 50% on Rotten Tomatoes, based on 68 reviews, with an average rating of 5.54/10. The website's critical consensus reads: "Interesting idea, poor execution." On Metacritic, the film has a weighted average score of 35 out of 100, based on 29 critics, indicating "generally unfavorable reviews".

BFI Screenonline summarised that it "is arguably a more effective tribute to Fred Astaire and Ginger Rogers than it is to Shakespeare - though entertaining enough on its own terms", its "transatlantic casting blends experienced Shakespeare players (Branagh himself, Adrian Lester, Timothy Spall, Richard Briers) with good-looking neophytes".

Roger Ebert called the film "winsome, charming, sweet and slight", but gave it only two-and-a-half out of four stars, attributing some of the film's flaws to the original material:

"All is light and winning, and yet somehow empty. It's no excuse that the starting point was probably the weakest of Shakespeare's plays. Love's Labour's Lost is hardly ever performed on the stage and has never been previously filmed, and there is a reason for that: It's not about anything. In its original form, instead of the songs and dances we have dialogue that's like an idle exercise in easy banter for Shakespeare."

Kenneth Turan of the Los Angeles Times complained that the film "should be fun but isn't... worst of all perhaps is its smug air of pleasure at how clever it thinks it's being."

Some critics complained about the casting. Nathan Lane as Costard received favourable notice, as did Adrian Lester. But the leads (Silverstone and Nivola) were generally panned; Stanley Kauffmann, who had been highly complimentary of Branagh's four-hour film version of Hamlet, called them "inadequate in every way." John Simon complained as well of cutting that left the film's best actors (he mentions McEwan and Briers) with little to do. Kauffmann and Simon both noted that the film's ending, in which newsreel footage shows the men going off to fight in World War II, was grotesquely at odds with the frothy tone of the movie it concluded.

Conversely, the film did receive notably positive reviews from such critics as Variety's Derek Elley, A. O. Scott of The New York Times, and online critic James Berardinelli. Elley described the film as a "luscious labor of love" saying, "anyone with an open mind and a hankering for the simple pleasures of Tinseltown's Golden Age will be rewarded with 90-odd minutes of often silly, frequently charming and always honest entertainment." Scott also gave the film a lukewarm review, calling the "gee-whiz amateurism" part of the movie's charm, stating "Even though Love's Labour's Lost is, in showbiz terms, a turkey stuffed with chestnuts, you wouldn't trade it for a pot of gold."

Berardinelli gave the film three out of four stars, calling it "about 1/3 Shakespeare, 1/3 song-and-dance, and 1/3 ribald slapstick" and describing the balance as "awkward, but the overall result is strangely appealing." He concluded:

"Although Love's Labour's Lost does not score the kind of complete success that Branagh has achieved with his other Shakespeare adaptations, it is a welcome addition, not only because it represents the first time the play has been brought to the screen, but because it shows the lengths to which the director is willing to stretch the envelope. Flaws (most of which are minor) aside, Love's Labour's Lost is an enjoyable trifle, especially for those who don't take their Shakespeare too seriously and those who love the old Hollywood musicals as much as Branagh obviously does."

=== Box office ===
Love's Labour's Lost was not a box office success. It opened on 31 March 2000 in the United Kingdom, grossing £143,649 from 186 screens on its opening weekend. It later opened on 11 June 2000 in the United States, playing on two screens and grossing $24,496 on its opening weekend. In its US release, Love's Labour's Lost played on fewer than 20 screens and brought in $284,291 against a budget of $13 million.

=== Awards and nominations ===
Award	Category	Recipients and nominees	Result
British Independent Film Awards	Best Performance by an Actor in a British Independent Film	Adrian Lester	Nominated
Motion Picture Sound Editors	Golden Reel Award – Music – Musical Feature (Foreign & Domestic)	Gerard McCann	Nominated
