= Sleuth (2007 film) =

2007 film directed by Kenneth Branagh

- Promotional thriller film poster
- Directed by: Kenneth Branagh
- Screenplay by: Harold Pinter
- Based on: Sleuth by Anthony Shaffer
- Produced by: Kenneth Branagh; Simon Halfon; Jude Law; Simon Moseley; Marion Pilowsky; Tom Sternberg
- Starring: Michael Caine; Jude Law
- Cinematography: Haris Zambarloukos
- Edited by: Neil Farrell
- Music by: Patrick Doyle
- Production companies: Castle Rock Entertainment; Riff Raff Productions; Timnick Films
- Distributed by: Sony Pictures Classics (United States, Canada, Latin America, France, Scandinavia, Spain and Italy); Paramount Pictures (United Kingdom, Ireland, Australia, New Zealand and South Africa)
- Release dates: 12 October 2007 (U.S. limited); 23 November 2007 (UK)
- Running time: 88 minutes
- Countries: United Kingdom; United States
- Language: English
- Box office: $4.8 million

Sleuth is a 2007 thriller film directed by Kenneth Branagh and starring Jude Law and Michael Caine. The screenplay by Harold Pinter is an adaptation of Anthony Shaffer's play, Sleuth. Caine had previously starred in a 1972 version, where he played Law's role against Laurence Olivier.

== Plot ==
Andrew Wyke is a famous author who lives alone in his high tech mansion after his wife leaves him for a younger man. Wyke meets Milo Tindle, who seems intent on convincing Wyke to let go of his feelings for his wife and agree to her request for a divorce. Wyke invites Tindle into his home under the guise of considering the divorce and instead puts him through a series of elaborate and emasculating mind games as a way of enacting revenge against his ex-wife.

== Cast ==
- Michael Caine as Andrew Wyke
- Jude Law as Milo Tindle

The film's screenwriter, Harold Pinter, credited as "Man on TV", is seen on a television in the background interviewing another man, played by an uncredited Kenneth Branagh. The only other person seen in the film is an uncredited actress, Carmel O'Sullivan, in the role of Maggie.

== Production ==
Caine had starred as hairdresser Milo Tindle opposite Laurence Olivier's novelist Andrew Wyke in the 1972 film Sleuth, with each being nominated for an Academy Award for their performance. In the 2007 film, Caine took the role of Wyke, and Law took Caine's role of Tindle.

This was the second time Law performed a film character originated by Caine, the first having been the title role of Alfie. Caine himself had previously starred in two different roles for two versions of Get Carter.

According to many accounts, this set out to be a remake of the 1972 version, but Pinter's screenplay-offered "a fresh take" on Shaffer's play and "a very different form" from the original film.

In his review of the film's debut at the 2007 Venice Film Festival, Roderick Conway Morris observed: "The reworking of the play is not just an adept transformation of theatre to film ... but also casts a revealing light on social history, reflecting the enormous changes in English society, language and morals in the nearly 40 years since the play first appeared on the London stage".

The screenwriter, actors and director insisted that this Sleuth was not a "remake". Law called it "a completely reinvented Sleuth... It didn't feel like a remake. I always loved the idea at its heart of two men battling it out for a woman you never meet". Law further felt that he "was creating a character (Tindle), I wasn't recreating one". Caine said: "I never felt that I had gone back to Sleuth". He called the Pinter script "an entirely different thing. There isn't a single line in it that was in the other one, and Pinter had never seen the [1972] movie. Jude [Law] gave him the stage play and said: 'Write a screenplay for me' ... It was a completely different experience". In a television interview conducted on RAI TV during the Venice International Film Festival, Caine stated: "If the script hadn't been by Harold Pinter, I wouldn't have done the movie".

Pinter said: "It's a totally new take...I had not either seen or read the play, and I hadn't seen the film adapted from the play either, so I knew nothing about it. So I simply read the play and I think it's totally transformed. I've kept one or two plot things because you have to but apart from that, I think I've made it my own".

Caine stated: "The first Sleuth I thought was great and the second Sleuth I thought was great until I read the reviews. I said to Pinter, 'What film did they show them?' I have a feeling that [the new] Sleuth will be rediscovered some day".

=== Claustrophobia ===
Manohla Dargis of The New York Times wrote a review headlined: "A Dance of Two Men, Twisting and Turning With a Gun That's More Than a Gun". In contrast to Sarah Lyall's New York Times preview, Dargis wrote that she did not like watching the film, finding it too claustrophobic: "Mr. Branagh fiddles with the lights, tilts the camera and hustles his hard-working actors upstairs and down and back again and into an elevator as small as a coffin built for one. He embellishes the screenplay’s every obvious conceit and word, hammering the point until you feel as if you’re trapped inside the elevator with Milo and Andrew, going up and down and up and down, though nowhere in particular".

In his interview with Martin A. Grove, Branagh mentions that the danger of inducing claustrophobia in audience members is a risk that he took into account in filming Sleuth: "What Branagh didn't do that many Hollywood directors would have done is to open the film up by, for instance, having the two men drive to a nearby pub at some point in their conversation. 'Well, it's interesting you say that,' he told [Grove], 'There were discussions about that, but we said, 'If we believe in the power of the writing here and the power of the performances, but also, frankly, if we believe in the audience and believe that the audience can find this as fascinating as I do on the pages and if we can realize it to meet all of their expectations then the claustrophobia (won't be a problem).' "

=== The House ===
Director Branagh found shooting in the house difficult yet interesting. "The minimalism I found was a great challenge. The elevator was Harold's idea, so that was there and was a central feature of what we are going to bring to it. And then everything else was drawn from contemporary British architecture, contemporary British artists. The wire figure is by Anthony Gormley, one of our most famous sculptors. Gary Hume did all the artwork on the walls". Custom designed furniture from Ron Arad completes the look.

== Release ==
=== Screenings ===
After premiering at the 64th Venice Film Festival on 30 August 2007, Sleuth was screened at the Toronto Film Festival on 10 September 2007. It was also screened at the Atlantic Film Festival, in Halifax, on 22 September 2007, the Aspen Filmfest on 26 September 2007, the Copenhagen International Film Festival, on 27 September 2007, the Calgary International Film Festival, in Alberta, on 28 September 2007 and the Haifa International Film Festival on 1 October 2007.

On 3 and 4 October 2007, Sleuth was screened at Variety's 2007 Screening Series in New York, at the Chelsea West Cinemas, and in Los Angeles, at the ArcLight Theatre. Kenneth Branagh, Michael Caine and Jude Law did interviews with the television programs The Today Show, RAI TV, Late Show with David Letterman, The Charlie Rose Show and Reel Talk with Jeffrey Lyons.

== Reception ==
On Rotten Tomatoes, the film has an approval rating of 37% based on 120 reviews with an average rating of 5.13/10. The critical consensus states: "Sleuth is so obvious and coarse, rather than suspenseful and action-packed, that it does nothing to improve on the original version". On Metacritic the film has a score of 49% based on reviews from 30 critics, indicating "mixed or average reviews".

Time film reviewer Richard Corliss indicated he was not pleased with the outcome, concluding with "if you consider what the exalted quartet of Branagh, Pinter, Caine and Law might have done with the project, and what they did to it, Sleuth has to be the worst prestige movie of the year".

Claudia Puig of USA Today was more appreciative, writing: "Caine and Law are in fine form bantering cleverly in this entertaining cat-and-mouse game, thanks to the inspired dialogue of Harold Pinter. They parry, using witticisms instead of swords. Then they do a dance of deception, a veritable tango. There's thievery, peril and plenty of double-crossing. (...) As directed by Kenneth Branagh, this new version is darker and more claustrophobic. In the original the house where all the action took place was Gothic and laden with gewgaws. The new domicile is stark and minimalist, and much more threatening. Branagh's version has more incipient horror and less camp".

Roger Ebert of the Chicago Sun-Times wrote: "It's no mystery that Sleuth is fascinating", observing that Pinter "has written a new country house mystery, which is not really a mystery at all in terms of its plot, and eerily impenetrable in its human relationship" and that "in Sleuth what [Kenneth Branagh] celebrates is perplexing, ominous, insinuating material in the hands of two skilled actors". J.R. Jones of The Chicago Reader wrote: "Director Kenneth Branagh has mercifully pared the action down to 88 minutes (the first movie dragged on for 138), but the final act, with its obscure homosexual flirtation, still seems to go on forever".

Carina Chocano, writing in the Los Angeles Times, stated: "The verbal sparring is so sharp [that] it's a wonder nobody loses an eye. [...] and it's an unmitigated pleasure to observe Caine and Law attack it with such ferocity. Sleuth is nasty fun". Terry Lawson of the Detroit Free Press, criticised the performances by the lead actors, saying: "We're left with two suitably hammy performances by Caine and Law, who do not forget they are actors playing actors".

Leonard Maltin, who rated the original film four out of four stars, gave this version a "BOMB" rating (zero out of four), the lowest rating he has ever given a Branagh film, stating that the new version "has every ounce of entertainment drained from it" and called the film "unbelievably bad".

== Soundtrack ==
Sleuth

Soundtrack album by Patrick Doyle
- Released: 9 October 2007
- Recorded: Air Lyndhurst Studios, London
- Genre: Film soundtrack
- Label: Varèse Sarabande
- Producers: Maggie Rodford, Robert Townson

Patrick Doyle is the composer and the music is performed by the London Symphony Orchestra. The soundtrack is produced by Varèse Sarabande and was released in October 2007.

Track listing

1. The Visitor – 2:06
2. The Ladder – 2:49
3. You're Now You – 1:26
4. I'm Not A Hairdresser – 3:28
5. Black Arrival – 2:22
6. Milo Tindle – 2:17
7. I Was Lying – 2:30
8. Itch Twitch – 2:23
9. Rat in a Trap – 2:26
10. One Set All – 2:24
11. Cobblers – 1:39
12. Sleuth – 6:05
13. Too Much Sleuth (Dance Mixes by Patrick Doyle Jr.) – 3:51
