= Swan Song (1992 film) =

1992 British short film

- Directed by: Kenneth Branagh
- Written by: Hugh Cruttwell
- Based on: Swan Song by Anton Chekhov
- Produced by: David Parfitt
- Starring: John Gielgud; Richard Briers
- Cinematography: Roger Lanser
- Edited by: Andrew Marcus
- Music by: Jimmy Yuill
- Release date: January 1992
- Running time: 23 minutes
- Country: United Kingdom
- Language: English

Swan Song is a 1992 British short film directed by Kenneth Branagh and adapted for the screen by Hugh Cruttwell from the one act play of the same name by Anton Chekhov. It stars John Gielgud as the aging actor Svetlovidov and Richard Briers as the prop-master Nikita.

== Awards ==
Swan Song was nominated for the Academy Award for Best Live Action Short Film.
