= Edmond (play) =

1982 one-act play by David Mamet

- Written by: David Mamet
- Original language: English
- Setting: New York City

Premiere
- Date premiered: June 4, 1982
- Place premiered: Goodman Theater, Chicago

Edmond is a one-act play written by David Mamet. It premiered at the Goodman Theatre in Chicago, Illinois, U.S., on June 4, 1982. The first New York production was October 27 of the same year, at the Provincetown Playhouse. The play consists of twenty-three short scenes. In the original production, each of the actors took on multiple roles, save the two playing Edmond and his wife. In the Chicago premiere and the original New York and London productions, the role of Edmond was played by frequent Mamet collaborator Colin Stinton. In a revival production at London's National Theatre, in 2003, the role was played by Kenneth Branagh.

A movie of the same name based upon the play, starring William H. Macy and Julia Stiles, has been shown at some film festivals in the U.S. and Europe, and underwent limited U.S. release on July 14, 2006.

== Synopsis ==
The plot, which has a certain fable-like quality, revolves around the titular character, Edmond Burke, a white-collar worker in New York City. After a visit to a fortune teller, he decides to leave his wife and embarks on an odyssey through New York's seedy underbelly, which takes him to two bars, a bordello, and a peep show. When he accuses a three-card monte dealer of running a crooked game, the dealer and his shills beat Edmond to the ground. Increasingly convinced of the ugliness and difficulty of human existence, Edmond buys a knife from a pawnshop. He threatens a woman on a subway platform, then beats an African-American pimp who is trying to rob him, while calling him racial slurs.

Invigorated by the act of violence, he goes to a coffeehouse and propositions his waitress, Glenna. At her apartment, he tells her how alive beating the pimp has made him feel in a highly racialized speech. Glenna compares the feeling to the one she gets when she is acting. Edmond claims she is not a real actress because she only takes acting classes and does not actually perform for a paying audience. Edmond encourages her to be honest with herself, and to say that she is not an actress but a waitress. Glenna begins to find his odd behavior disturbing and asks him to leave. An argument escalates, and Edmond kills her with the knife he has bought.

Later, he hears a preacher at a mission preach that all souls can be redeemed through faith. Edmond wants to go testify to the preacher, but he is identified by the woman from the subway and arrested. He has a short reunion with his wife, who serves him with divorce papers.

In prison, a large African-American cellmate is assigned to him. In a long philosophical speech, Edmond expresses conciliatory feelings to his cellmate and blacks in general, saying that people subconsciously desire what they fear and so whites should not try to avoid blacks. His uninterested cellmate first offers him a cigarette, and then punches him hard in the face twice. Then he threatens to kill him unless Edmond performs oral sex on him, which he does.

Edmond meets with a priest and admits to being sodomized. Although he has reported the incident to the correctional officers, they were uninterested and simply said: "It happens." This is followed by an angry Edmond ranting about God.

In the penultimate scene, Edmond appears to forgive his cellmate, and in the final scene, set a number of years later, the two ruminate on the uncertainty of life and the role of destiny in human affairs as Edmond smokes a cigarette. Edmond utters a line that is nearly an exact quote of one from Hamlet: "There is a destiny that shapes our ends...rough-hew them how we may." The play ends as the two say "good night" and Edmond kisses his cellmate on the mouth good night, lying beside him in bed.

== See also ==
- Prison rape
