= Renaissance Theatre Company =

London theatre company founded in 1987

- Formation: 1987
- Founder: Kenneth Branagh; David Parfitt
- Dissolved: 1992

The Renaissance Theatre Company was a theatre company founded in 1987 by Kenneth Branagh and David Parfitt. It was disbanded in 1992.

== History ==
The company was a development of the work Branagh and Parfitt had been doing periodically on the London 'Fringe', producing and appearing in lunchtime shows, leading up to Branagh's full-scale production of Romeo and Juliet, at the Lyric Studio in Hammersmith, London, in August 1986 co-starring Branagh and Samantha Bond.

With a group of 'angels'—fellow actors, writers and kindred spirits—the newly formed company was able to finance its first full season, including the premiere of Branagh's thriller, Public Enemy, in the Lyric Hammersmith main house, with Branagh in the leading role. In the same season this was followed by John Sessions' satirical solo The Life of Napoleon which transferred from Riverside Studios to the Albery Theatre.

Over Christmas 1987 the season ended with Branagh's production of Twelfth Night also at Riverside Studios, starring Richard Briers as Malvolio, Frances Barber as Viola, and with an original score directed on stage by Scottish actor, musician and composer Patrick Doyle (who later achieved fame as an international film composer). The production was also recorded by Thames Television.

Although Renaissance received no public funding, it partnered in 1988 with John Adams and the Birmingham Rep on a touring season of plays launched as Renaissance Shakespeare on the Road, with three classical actors making their directing debuts: Judi Dench with Much Ado About Nothing; Geraldine McEwan with As You Like It; and Derek Jacobi with Hamlet, which featured Branagh in the title role. After a UK tour and an August stop-over at Elsinore, the three productions were seen in a London repertoire season at the Phoenix Theatre.

In 1989, Judi Dench again worked as director for the Renaissance revival of both the theatre and television productions of Look Back in Anger by John Osborne, presented first in Belfast then in London at the Lyric Theatre, starring Branagh as Jimmy Porter and Emma Thompson as Alison.

Renaissance moved into different mediums such as Branagh's Academy Award-winning film version of Henry V but also by producing three Shakespeare plays on radio: Hamlet, Romeo and Juliet, and finally, King Lear starring Sir John Gielgud.

The company's last two major stage productions were Uncle Vanya (with Richard Briers and Peter Egan) and Coriolanus produced in conjunction with the Chichester Festival Theatre and starring Branagh in the title role and Judi Dench as his mother, Volumnia.

Branagh subsequently moved into film making and the company was disbanded in 1992.

== Legacy ==
The archives and online searchable catalogue of the Renaissance Theatre Company are part of the Shakespeare Collections at the University of Birmingham. Online versions of the digitised prompt books from the company archive and the Henry V script and storyboards are also part of the University's collection. Kenneth Branagh is an Honorary Research Fellow of the Shakespeare Institute, University of Birmingham.
