= Henry V (1989 film) =

1989 British historical drama film

- Theatrical release poster
- Directed by: Kenneth Branagh
- Screenplay by: Kenneth Branagh
- Based on: Henry V 1600 play by William Shakespeare
- Produced by: Bruce Sharman
- Starring: Kenneth Branagh; Paul Scofield; Derek Jacobi; Ian Holm; Emma Thompson; Alec McCowen; Judi Dench; Christian Bale
- Narrated by: Derek Jacobi
- Cinematography: Kenneth MacMillan
- Edited by: Michael Bradsell
- Music by: Patrick Doyle
- Production companies: British Broadcasting Corporation; Renaissance Films
- Distributed by: Curzon Film Distributors
- Release date: 6 October 1989 (London)
- Running time: 137 minutes
- Country: United Kingdom
- Languages: English; French
- Budget: $9 million
- Box office: $10.2 million (US gross only)

Henry V is a 1989 British historical drama film written and directed by Kenneth Branagh in his feature directorial debut, based on William Shakespeare's history play of the same name. It stars Branagh in the title role of King Henry V of England, with Paul Scofield, Derek Jacobi, Ian Holm, Brian Blessed, Emma Thompson (in her theatrical debut), Alec McCowen, Judi Dench, Robbie Coltrane, and Christian Bale in supporting roles.

Henry V received widespread critical acclaim and is considered one of the best Shakespeare screen adaptations ever produced. At the 62nd Academy Awards, the film won Best Costume Design and Branagh received nominations for Best Director and Best Actor.

== Plot ==
The film begins with Chorus, in this case a person in modern dress, introducing the subject of the play. He is walking through an empty film studio and ends his monologue by opening the doors to begin the main action. Chorus reappears several times during the film, his speeches helping to explain and progress the action.

The following act divisions reflect the original play, not the film.

=== Act 1 ===
Early 15th century in England: The Bishop of Ely and the Archbishop of Canterbury collude to distract young King Henry V from passing a decree that might confiscate property from the church. They agree to talk him into invading France. Canterbury appears in the throne room and explains to the King's advisers that Henry is rightful heir to the throne of France on the grounds that the Salic law in France unjustly bars his claim to the throne and should be disregarded. Supported by the noblemen Exeter and Westmoreland, the clergymen manage to persuade Henry to declare war on France if his claim on the French crown is denied.

Henry calls in Montjoy, a representative of Louis, the Dauphin. The Dauphin's condescending response takes the form of the delivery of a chest of tennis balls. Exeter, who opens the chest, is appalled, but Henry at first takes the insult calmly. He goes on to state his determination to attack France, dismisses the ambassador and starts to plan his campaign.

John Falstaff is taken ill in Mistress Quickly's inn. His friends Bardolph, Ancient Pistol, and Corporal Nym remember the good times they had together with Henry before he was king and denounced them all.

=== Act 2 ===
Henry tricks three high-ranked traitors into pronouncing their own sentence by asking advice on the case of a man who drunkenly shouted insults at him in the street. When they recommend that he show no mercy to this minor offender, the King reveals his knowledge of their own sedition. They draw their daggers, but are quickly subdued by Henry's loyal nobles. Exeter arrests them for high treason and Henry orders their execution before crossing the English Channel. Falstaff dies and Bardolph, Pistol, Nym, and Falstaff's page, Robin, depart for France.

Meanwhile, in France, King Charles VI and his noblemen discuss King Henry's threats. The Dauphin (portrayed as stubborn and cowardly) says he does not fear Henry, but Charles and the Constable of France are worried because of Henry's martial ancestors and the successful previous English invasions. Exeter arrives in full plate armour. He informs them that Henry demands the French crown and is prepared to take it by force if it is withheld, and delivers an insulting message to the Dauphin. King Charles tells Exeter he will give him a reply the following day.

=== Act 3 ===
King Henry delivers a morale-boosting speech to his troops and attacks the walled city of Harfleur. When the Dauphin fails to relieve the city in time, the governor surrenders in return for Henry's promise to do Harfleur's population no harm. Henry orders Exeter to repair its fortifications.

Katherine, a French princess who had been engaged to marry King Henry in an arrangement made before the war, asks her lady-in-waiting Alice to teach the English for some parts of the body. They mispronounce the words for comic effect and joke that foot sounds rude in French. In a silent moment, Katherine watches her father and his courtiers and notes how worried they appear. King Charles finally orders his nobles to engage Henry's troops, halt their advance, and bring Henry back a prisoner.

The English troops struggle toward Calais through foul weather and sickness. Bardolph is hanged for looting a church. The French herald Montjoy arrives and demands Henry pay a ransom for his person or place himself and his entire army at risk. Henry refuses, replying that even his reduced and sickly army is sufficient to resist a French attack.

=== Act 4 ===
In the boisterous French camp the night before the Battle of Agincourt (1415), the French nobility wait impatiently for the morning, and it is clear that the Dauphin is not popular with the other nobles. In the more sober and silent English camp, following a brief meeting with his brothers, Gloucester and Bedford, together with Sir Thomas Erpingham, Henry decides to look into the state of his troops and wanders his camp in disguise. He meets Pistol, who fails to recognise him. Soon afterwards, he encounters a small group of soldiers, including Bates and Williams, with whom he debates his own culpability for any deaths to follow. He and Williams almost come to blows, and they agree to duel the day after, should they survive. When Williams and his friends leave the King alone, Henry breaks into a monologue about his burdens and prays to God for help.

Next morning, the English Army is outnumbered five to one. Henry encourages his troops with his St Crispin's Day Speech and responds angrily when Montjoy renews the Dauphin's offer of ransom. The battle begins with the charge of the French cavalry, but the English archery and countercharge cut down a large part of the advancing army before it ever reaches their lines. When the Constable of France is killed, the dismayed French leaders realise the battle is lost and become desperate. Some of them manage to get behind enemy lines and, deprived of any hope to turn the battle, break the code of chivalry by murdering the young and defenseless English pages (including Robin) and setting fire to the English tents. Henry and his officer Fluellen come upon the carnage and are still appalled when Montjoy delivers the French surrender.

Henry returns Williams' glove, this time out of disguise, and Williams is shocked to learn that the man he was arguing with the night before was King Henry himself.

The act ends with a four-minute long tracking shot, as Non nobis is sung and the dead and wounded are carried off the field. Henry himself carries Robin.

=== Act 5 ===
Finally negotiations are made for Henry to be named king of both England and France. While the French and English royal delegations negotiate the Treaty of Troyes, the sides take a brief intermission in which Henry privately speaks with Katherine (Kate). He assures Kate that by marrying a French princess he demonstrates his respect for the people of France, and professes his love for her. The delegation returns and Henry announces a hopeful era of long peace with the joining of the two kingdoms. The film ends with Chorus detailing the history after the events of the film, culminating in the loss of the French throne by Henry VI.

== Cast ==
- Kenneth Branagh as King Henry V of England
- Paul Scofield as King Charles VI of France
- Derek Jacobi as Chorus
- Ian Holm as Fluellen, a Welsh officer in Henry's army
- Brian Blessed as the Duke of Exeter, uncle to the King
- Emma Thompson as Katherine, daughter of King Charles VI
- Judi Dench as Mistress Quickly, an innkeeper
- Christian Bale as Robin, the luggage-boy
- Robbie Coltrane as Sir John Falstaff, former friend of the King
- Alec McCowen as the Bishop of Ely
- James Larkin as the Duke of Bedford, brother to the King
- Simon Shepherd as the Duke of Gloucester, brother to the King
- James Simmons as the Duke of York
- Charles Kay as the Archbishop of Canterbury
- Paul Gregory as the Earl of Westmorland
- Nicholas Ferguson as the Earl of Warwick
- Tom Whitehouse as John Talbot
- Fabian Cartwright as the Earl of Cambridge
- Stephen Simms as Lord Scrope
- Jay Villiers as Sir Thomas Grey
- Edward Jewesbury as Sir Thomas Erpingham, officer in Henry's army
- Daniel Webb as Gower, an English officer in Henry's army
- Jimmy Yuill as Jamy, a Scottish officer in Henry's army
- John Sessions as Macmorris, an Irish officer in Henry's army
- Shaun Prendergast as Bates, soldier in Henry's army
- Pat Doyle as Court, soldier in Henry's army
- Michael Williams as Michael Williams, soldier in Henry's army
- Richard Briers as Bardolph, former friend of the King and lieutenant in his army
- Geoffrey Hutchings as Nym, former friend of the King and corporal in his army
- Robert Stephens as Pistol, former friend of the King and ensign (using the old title "ancient") in his army
- Michael Maloney as Louis, the Dauphin
- Richard Clifford as Duke of Orléans
- Nigel Greaves as the Duke of Berry
- Julian Gartside as the Duke of Bretagne
- Harold Innocent as Duke of Burgundy
- Richard Easton as the Constable of France
- Colin Hurley as Grandpré, a French lord
- Geraldine McEwan as Alice, a lady attending on Katharine
- David Lloyd Meredith as the Governor of Harfleur
- Christopher Ravenscroft as Montjoy, a French herald
- David Parfitt as Messenger

== Production ==
=== Screenplay ===
The text of the play is heavily edited. Additionally, Branagh incorporated flashbacks using extracts from Henry IV, Part 1 and Part 2 in which Henry interacts with the character of Falstaff, who, in Shakespeare's Henry V, is never seen, merely announced to be deathly ill in Act 2 scene 1, and dead in Act 2 scene 3. The scenes involve a brief summary of Henry's denouncement of Falstaff primarily with lines from Act 2, scene 4 of Henry IV part 1 and a brief though important utterance of Henry's final repudiation of Falstaff in Part 2, "I know thee not, old man." The film also uses Falstaff's line "do not, when thou art King, hang a thief" from Henry IV Part 1 but gives it to Bardolph, in order to highlight the poignancy when Henry later has Bardolph executed.

=== Filming ===
Henry V was made on an estimated budget of $9 million. The film was produced by Bruce Sharman with the British Broadcasting Corporation and Branagh's company Renaissance Films. Principal photography commenced on 31 October 1988 and concluded 19 December the same year. Sixty per cent of production was shot on sound stages at Shepperton Studios, while many of the battle sequences were shot on fields adjacent to the Shepperton complex.

=== Style ===
Branagh's film is frequently compared with the 1944 film of the play, which was directed by and starring Laurence Olivier. The visual style of Branagh's film is grittier and more realistic than that of Olivier's. For example, his film avoids Olivier's use of stylised sets, and, where Olivier staged the Battle of Agincourt on a sunlit field, Branagh's takes place amid rain-drenched mud and gore. Nearly all of the scenes involving the comic characters were also staged as drama, rather than in the broad, more slapstick way in which Olivier staged them, because Branagh felt that modern audiences would not see the humour in these scenes. There is a historical inaccuracy in that Charles VI of France was played by 67-year-old Paul Scofield, perhaps to enhance the effect of the historical king's mental illness that he had already been suffering for twenty years, but Charles VI was only 46 years old at the time of Agincourt. Olivier's movie also uses an older actor to play Charles VI (Harcourt Williams, who was 66 years old at the time of filming).

While the text of the Chorus's monologues are the same, the setting for them has been adapted to reflect the nature of the motion picture adaptation of the play. Unlike the other performers, who are dressed in clothing contemporary to the actual Henry V to reflect their characters, the Chorus is dressed in modern 20th century clothing. The opening monologue, originally written to compensate for the limitations of a theatre-staged production to represent the historical scenes presented, is delivered on an empty motion picture sound stage with unfinished sets. The other chorus monologues are delivered on location where the relevant action is taking place. In all cases, the chorus speaks directly to the camera, addressing the audience.

=== Music ===
Professional ratings
Review scores
Source	Rating
AllMusic	link
Filmtracks	link

The score to Henry V was written by first-time film composer Patrick Doyle. It was performed by the City of Birmingham Symphony Orchestra and conducted by Simon Rattle. The soundtrack was released 8 November 1989 through EMI Classics and features fifteen tracks of score at a running time just under an hour. Patrick Doyle also appeared in the film as the first soldier to begin singing "Non Nobis, Domine" following the battle at Agincourt.

1. "Opening Title/'O! for a Muse of Fire'" (3:34)
2. "King Henry V Theme/The Boar's Head" (2:46)
3. "The Three Traitors" (2:03)
4. "Now, Lords, for France!" (2:40)
5. "The Death of Falstaff" (1:54)
6. "Once More Unto the Breach" (3:45)
7. "The Threat to the Governor of Harfleur/Katherine of France/The March to Calais" (5:51)
8. "The Death of Bardolph" (2:22)
9. "Upon the King" (4:50)
10. "St. Crispin's Day/The Battle of Agincourt" (14:13)
11. "The Day is Yours" (2:34)
12. "Non Nobis, Domine" (4:09)
13. "The Wooing of Katherine" (2:24)
14. "Let This Acceptance Take" (2:50)
15. "End Title" (2:35)

Doyle was later awarded the 1989 Ivor Novello Award for Best Film Theme for "Non Nobis, Domine".

== Archives ==
Online versions of the digitised script and storyboards from the film are part of the Renaissance Theatre Company Archive held at the University of Birmingham.

== Release ==
=== Home media ===
CBS/Fox Video released a pan and scan VHS edition in 1990 and a widescreen LaserDisc edition in 1991. MGM Home Entertainment later released Henry V on DVD 18 July 2000, also preserving the widescreen format of the original theatrical presentation. The film was released on Blu-ray on 27 January 2015 by Shout! Factory.

== Reception ==
=== Critical response ===
Henry V received near-universal critical acclaim for Branagh's Oscar-nominated performance and direction, for the accessibility of its Shakespearean language, and for its score by Patrick Doyle. On Rotten Tomatoes, the film has an approval rating of 98% based on 41 reviews, with an average rating of 8.2/10. The site's critics' consensus reads: "Pehaps [sic] Kenneth Branagh's most fully realised Shakespeare adaptation, Henry V is an energetic, passionate, and wonderfully acted film". On Metacritic, it has a score of 83 out of 100, based on 17 reviews, indicating "Universal acclaim". Henry V also ranks #1 on the Rotten Tomatoes list of Greatest Shakespeare Movies, beating Akira Kurosawa's Ran (1985) and Branagh's own version of Hamlet (1996), respectively ranking in second and third place.

Roger Ebert of the Chicago Sun-Times gave the film three-and-a-half out of four stars, praising Branagh's performance and writing: "There is no more stirring summons to arms in all of literature than Henry's speech to his troops on St. Crispan's [sic] Day, ending with the lyrical 'We few, we happy few, we band of brothers.' To deliver this speech successfully is to pass the acid test for anyone daring to perform the role of Henry V in public, and as Kenneth Branagh, as Henry, stood up on the dawn of the Battle of Agincourt and delivered the famous words, I was emotionally stirred even though I had heard them many times before. That is one test of a great Shakespearian actor: to take the familiar and make it new". Variety magazine also gave the film a positive review, calling Henry V: "A stirring, gritty and enjoyable pic which offers a plethora of fine performances from some of the U.K.'s brightest talents".

=== Box office ===
The film grossed over $10 million in the U.S. and at the time of its widest release played on 134 U.S. screens.

It made £652,555 in the UK.

=== Accolades ===
Award	Date of ceremony	Category	Recipients	Result
Academy Awards	March 26, 1990	Best Director	Kenneth Branagh	Nominated
Academy Awards	March 26, 1990	Best Actor	Kenneth Branagh	Nominated
Academy Awards	March 26, 1990	Best Costume Design	Phyllis Dalton	Won
Brit Awards	18 February 1990	Soundtrack/Cast Recording		Nominated
British Academy Film Awards	11 March 1990	Best Direction	Kenneth Branagh	Won
British Academy Film Awards	11 March 1990	Best Actor in a Leading Role	Kenneth Branagh	Nominated
British Academy Film Awards	11 March 1990	Best Cinematography	Kenneth MacMillan	Nominated
British Academy Film Awards	11 March 1990	Best Costume Design	Phyllis Dalton	Nominated
British Academy Film Awards	11 March 1990	Best Production Design	Tim Harvey	Nominated
British Academy Film Awards	11 March 1990	Best Sound	Campbell Askew, David Crozier, Robin O'Donoghue	Nominated
Chicago Film Critics Association	March 8, 1990	Best Film		Nominated
Chicago Film Critics Association	March 8, 1990	Best Foreign Film		Won
Chicago Film Critics Association	March 8, 1990	Best Director	Kenneth Branagh	Nominated
Chicago Film Critics Association	March 8, 1990	Best Actor	Kenneth Branagh	Nominated
Chicago Film Critics Association	March 8, 1990	Most Promising Actor	Kenneth Branagh	Nominated
European Film Awards	2 December 1990	Young European Film of the Year	Kenneth Branagh	Won
European Film Awards	2 December 1990	European Actor of the Year	Kenneth Branagh	Won
Evening Standard British Film Awards	28 January 1990	Best Film		Won
Ivor Novello Awards	2 April 1990	Best Film Theme or Song	"Non Nobis, Domine" by Patrick Doyle	Won
Nastro d'Argento Awards	16 March 1991	Best Male Dubbing	Tonino Accolla (for the dubbing of Kenneth Branagh in the Italian version)	Won
Nastro d'Argento Awards	16 March 1991	European Nastro d'Argento	Kenneth Branagh	Nominated
National Board of Review	February 26, 1990	Top Ten Films		Won (Note: This award does not have a single winner, but recognizes multiple films.)
National Board of Review	February 26, 1990	Best Director	Kenneth Branagh	Won
New York Film Critics Circle	January 14, 1990	Best New Director	Kenneth Branagh	Won
Sant Jordi Awards	27 May 1991	Best Foreign Actor	Kenneth Branagh	Won

== See also ==
- List of historical drama films
- List of William Shakespeare film adaptations
