= Hercule Poirot (film series) =

Mystery film series based on Agatha Christie's Poirot stories (2017–present)

- Created by: Michael Green; Kenneth Branagh
- Owner: 20th Century Studios
- Years: 2017–present
- Based on: Hercule Poirot by Agatha Christie

Films and television
- Film(s): Murder on the Orient Express (2017); Death on the Nile (2022); A Haunting in Venice (2023)

Audio
- Soundtrack(s): Murder on the Orient Express (Original Motion Picture Soundtrack) (2017); Death on the Nile (Original Motion Picture Soundtrack) (2022); A Haunting in Venice (Original Motion Picture Soundtrack) (2023)

Hercule Poirot (UK: /ˈɛərkjuːl ˈpwɑːroʊ/, US: /hɜːrˈkjuːl pwɑːˈroʊ/) is a mystery film series developed by 20th Century Studios based on the eponymous book series created by Agatha Christie. It stars Kenneth Branagh, who directed all three films. The series has grossed over $600 million worldwide and has received a generally positive critical reception.

== Development ==
Following the commercial success of Murder on the Orient Express (2017), 20th Century Fox announced plans for a sequel, with Kenneth Branagh returning as director and reprising his role as Hercule Poirot. The sequel, Death on the Nile, was officially confirmed shortly after the first film's release in 2017. Screenwriter Michael Green, who adapted Murder on the Orient Express, was brought back to pen the script. Production was initially set to begin in mid-2019, but delays pushed principal photography to September 2019. The film was primarily shot at Longcross Studios in England, with additional filming in Egypt. Originally scheduled for a 2020 release, Death on the Nile faced multiple delays due to the COVID-19 pandemic before ultimately premiering in February 2022 under the now-rebranded 20th Century Studios.

Before the release of Death on the Nile, Branagh expressed interest in continuing the series with more Poirot adaptations. A third installment was later confirmed, titled A Haunting in Venice, based on Agatha Christie's novel Hallowe'en Party. Michael Green returned as the screenwriter, with Branagh once again directing and starring as Poirot. The film marked a shift in tone from its predecessors, incorporating gothic horror elements. Filming took place in Venice and at Pinewood Studios in late 2022. A Haunting in Venice was released in September 2023, receiving a generally positive critical response.

Branagh has since stated that he remains open to further adaptations, citing Agatha Christie's extensive library of Poirot stories as potential material for future films.

== Films ==
Film	Original release date	Director	Screenwriter(s)	Story by	Producer(s)
Murder on the Orient Express	10 November 2017	Kenneth Branagh	Michael Green	Agatha Christie	Mark Gordon, Ridley Scott, Judy Hofflund, Simon Kinberg, Kenneth Branagh & Michael Schaefer
Death on the Nile	11 February 2022	Kenneth Branagh	Michael Green	Agatha Christie	Ridley Scott, Judy Hofflund, Kevin J. Walsh & Kenneth Branagh
A Haunting in Venice	15 September 2023	Kenneth Branagh	Michael Green	Agatha Christie	Ridley Scott, Judy Hofflund, Simon Kinberg & Kenneth Branagh

=== Murder on the Orient Express (2017) ===
Belgian detective Hercule Poirot boards the luxurious Orient Express for what should be a peaceful journey, but when a shady American businessman, Samuel Ratchett, is found murdered in his compartment, Poirot is tasked with solving the case. As the train becomes stranded due to an avalanche, Poirot interviews the diverse group of passengers, uncovering hidden connections and long-buried secrets. With time running out, he must untangle the web of lies to reveal the shocking truth behind the murder. The first film in the series, it was released in theaters on November 10, 2017.

Upon its release, the film was met with mixed reviews from critics, but was a box-office success, becoming the twenty-sixth highest-grossing film of 2017.

=== Death on the Nile (2022) ===
Hercule Poirot embarks on a glamorous river cruise in Egypt, hoping for a relaxing voyage. When wealthy heiress Linnet Ridgeway-Doyle is found murdered, Poirot must unravel a tangled web of love, jealousy, and betrayal among the passengers. As tensions rise and more lives are put at risk, he races against time to uncover the killer before they strike again. The second film in the series, it was released in theaters on February 11, 2022.

It was originally set to be released on December 20, 2019, but was delayed several times due to production issues and COVID-19 pandemic until it was finally released in February 2022. Upon its release, the film received mixed reviews from critics but was a moderate box-office success, becoming the thirty-seventh highest-grossing film of 2022.

=== A Haunting in Venice (2023) ===
Now retired and living in self-imposed exile in Venice, Hercule Poirot reluctantly attends a séance in a decaying palazzo on Halloween night. When one of the guests is mysteriously murdered, Poirot is drawn into a chilling investigation that blurs the line between the supernatural and reality. Confronting eerie occurrences and deeply buried secrets, he must use his skills to separate fact from fiction. The third film in the series, it was released in theaters on September 15, 2023.

Upon its release, the film received generally positive reviews from critics and was a modest box-office success, becoming the fifty-seventh highest-grossing film of 2023.

=== Future ===
In October 2024, executive producer James Prichard hinted at possible future installments, stating that much like A Haunting in Venice, future films could potentially break from the norm and add other elements besides the supernatural, also stating that Kenneth Branagh and Michael Green could reprise their roles as director and screenwriter respectively.

That same month, 20th Century Studios boss Steve Asbell confirmed that other Agatha Christie stories will be adapted including And Then There Were None, The Witness for the Prosecution, and a Miss Marple film.

In September 2026, Branagh stated that he is open to reprising the role and expressed interest in an adaptation of Hercule Poirot's Christmas.

== Cast and characters ==
The following table lists the main cast members of the Hercule Poirot film series and their appearances in each film.

Characters	Films		
Characters	Murder on the Orient Express	Death on the Nile	A Haunting in Venice
Characters	2017	2022	2023
Hercule Poirot	Kenneth Branagh	Kenneth Branagh	Kenneth Branagh
Monsieur Tim Bouc	Tom Bateman	Tom Bateman	
Murder on the Orient Express
Caroline Hubbard	Michelle Pfeiffer		
Samuel Ratchett	Johnny Depp		
Edward Masterman	Derek Jacobi		
Hector MacQueen	Josh Gad		
Princess Natalia Dragomiroff	Judi Dench		
Hildegarde Schmidt	Olivia Colman		
Count Rudolph Andreyni	Sergei Polunin		
Countess Helena Andrenyi	Lucy Boynton		
Dr. John Arbuthnot	Leslie Odom Jr.		
Miss Mary Debenham	Daisy Ridley		
Pilar Estravados	Penélope Cruz		
Biniamino Marquez	Manuel Garcia-Rulfo		
Gerhard Hardman	Willem Dafoe		
Pierre Michel	Marwan Kenzari		
Death on the Nile
Simon Doyle		Armie Hammer	
Linnet Ridgeway-Doyle		Gal Gadot	
Jacqueline de Bellefort		Emma Mackey	
Euphemia Bouc		Annette Bening	
Louise Bourget		Rose Leslie	
Salome Otterbourne		Sophie Okonedo	
Rosalie Otterbourne		Letitia Wright	
Marie Van Schuyler		Jennifer Saunders	
Miss Bowers		Dawn French	
Andrew Katchadourian		Ali Fazal	
Dr. Linus Windlesham		Russell Brand	
A Haunting in Venice
Ariadne Oliver			Tina Fey
Vitale Portfoglio			Riccardo Scamarcio
Rowena Drake			Kelly Reilly
Joyce Reynolds			Michelle Yeoh
Maxime Gerard			Kyle Allen
Olga Seminoff			Camille Cottin
Dr. Leslie Ferrier			Jamie Dornan
Leopold Ferrier			Jude Hill
Desdemona Holland			Emma Laird
Nicholas Holland			Ali Khan

== Crew ==
The following table lists the main crew members involved in each film.

Role	Film		
Role	Murder on the Orient Express (2017)	Death on the Nile (2022)	A Haunting in Venice (2023)
Director	Kenneth Branagh	Kenneth Branagh	Kenneth Branagh
Screenwriter(s)	Michael Green	Michael Green	Michael Green
Producer(s)	Mark Gordon; Ridley Scott; Judy Hofflund; Simon Kinberg; Kenneth Branagh; Michael Schaefer	Ridley Scott; Judy Hofflund; Kevin J. Walsh; Kenneth Branagh	Ridley Scott; Judy Hofflund; Simon Kinberg; Kenneth Branagh
Based on	Murder on the Orient Express by Agatha Christie	Death on the Nile by Agatha Christie	Hallowe'en Party by Agatha Christie
Cinematographer	Haris Zambarloukos	Haris Zambarloukos	Haris Zambarloukos
Editor	Mick Audsley	Úna Ní Dhonghaíle	Lucy Donaldson
Composer	Patrick Doyle	Patrick Doyle	Hildur Guðnadóttir
Production companies	Kinberg Genre; Scott Free Productions; The Mark Gordon Company		Kinberg Genre; Scott Free Productions; Agatha Christie Limited; The Mark Gordon Company
Distributor	20th Century Studios		
Running time	114 mins	127 mins	103 mins

== Reception ==
=== Box office performance ===
Film	Original release date	Box office gross			All-time ranking		Budget	Ref.
Film	Original release date	U.S. and Canada	Other territories	Worldwide	U.S. and Canada	Worldwide	Budget	Ref.
Murder on the Orient Express	10 November 2017	$102,826,543	$249,963,268	$352,789,811	783	458	$55 million	
Death on the Nile	11 February 2022	$45,630,104	$91,677,131	$137,307,235	1,000+	1,000+	$90–100 million	
A Haunting in Venice	15 September 2023	$42,471,412	$79,819,044	$122,290,456	1,000+	1,000+	$60 million	
Total		$190,928,059	$421,459,443	$612,387,502			$205–215 million	

=== Critical and public response ===
Film	Critical		Public	
Film	Rotten Tomatoes	Metacritic	CinemaScore	PostTrak
Murder on the Orient Express	60% (300 reviews)	52 (46 reviews)	B	—N/a
Death on the Nile	62% (291 reviews)	52 (51 reviews)	B	77%
A Haunting in Venice	75% (296 reviews)	63 (52 reviews)	B	73%
