= Murder on the Orient Express (soundtrack) =

2017 film soundtrack album

Murder on the Orient Express (Original Motion Picture Soundtrack)

Film score by Patrick Doyle
- Released: November 3, 2017
- Recorded: 2017
- Venue: London
- Studios: AIR Lyndhurst Hall; AIR-Edel Recording Studios
- Genre: Film score
- Length: 57:00
- Label: Sony Masterworks
- Producer: Patrick Doyle

Patrick Doyle chronology
The Emoji Movie (2017)	Murder on the Orient Express (2017)	Sgt. Stubby: An American Hero (2018)

Murder on the Orient Express (Original Motion Picture Soundtrack) is the film score to the 2017 film Murder on the Orient Express directed by Kenneth Branagh based on the 1934 novel of the same name by Agatha Christie and the first installment of the Hercule Poirot film series. The film's original score is composed by Patrick Doyle and was released through Sony Masterworks on November 3, 2017.

== Development ==
In a BBC Radio 3 interaction with Sean Rafferty, composer Patrick Doyle, a frequent collaborator of Branagh, stated that he would be composing music for Murder on the Orient Express. Like his previous films where he would create a template of various sounds, Doyle assembled a conceptual suite inspired by oriental and occidental music and early classical music. Doyle used various indigenous flute sounds and Turkish instruments, including zither, cimbalom, ney flute, duduk and timbres.

For the main theme, Doyle used an ostinato motif to symbolize the movement of train along with rising arpeggios. For Armstrong's theme, he used delicate piano and solo cello. Doyle further wrote the song "Night Train" which was later used in the film as a piece for solo piano, that utilized 1940s harmonies and saxophones playing the "woo-woo" sounds resembling the train horn, and the "chugga" sounds of the string ostinato, which heard in "The Orient Express". These sounds helped creating the resonance of the train. Doyle further mixed the rhythm of the train with the thematic material of "Poirot's Theme" which he drew inspiration from his theme composed for Carlito's Way in the end.

Though the song "Night Train" never used, the solo piano version called "Poirot's Theme" was used when Poirot comes off the train at the end, which he considered it to be jazzy, melancholic and wistful. Doyle considered the score had a rich palette of thematic material and melodies but the music for Poirot, Orient Express and the Armstrong family were the prominent motifs heard in the film. The song "Never Forget" was conceptualized late in the process, derived from the Armstrong theme as Branagh considered it to make a beautiful song. Based on that theme, Doyle sent the melody to Branagh for which he wrote the first verse, and then composed the rest of the song, while Branagh wrote the last verse and chorus. Branagh then suggested Michelle Pfeiffer to record the song, to which Pfeiffer agreed and eventually recorded at San Francisco.

== Reception ==
Jonathan Broxton of Movie Music UK considered "Murder on the Orient Express is one of the scores of the year". He added "[...] Doyle judged everything perfectly, allowing the inner workings of Poirot's mind to take center state as he quietly, methodically solves the case. This, combined with the wonderfully evocative opening sequence in the Middle East, the ebullient and sweeping Traveling sequence, the brief explosions of action, and the extraordinarily powerful finale in Cue of the Year contender “Justice,” reminds me why I have always held Patrick Doyle in such high esteem, and why his collaborations with Kenneth Branagh should always be something to be greatly anticipated."

James Southall of Movie Wave wrote "From the buzz and excitement of the opening, through the suspenseful and sometimes mysterious middle section to the grand catharsis, Patrick Doyle goes full steam ahead – never getting near to going off the rails of his carefully-plotted course. Best of all, it's supremely elegant throughout – the thematic material is exquisite, the emotional highs and lows all richly earned." Pete Simons of Synchrotones wrote "A new Doyle is (almost) always a pleasure and Murder on the Orient Express sure is a fine score. It doesn't get me all excited though."

Filmtracks wrote "All put together, Murder on the Orient Express is an encapsulating, intelligent, and effective suspense score laced with just enough romantic lyricism to suffice for the period and lavish setting." Sean Wilson of Mfiles wrote "It's the culmination of another fine score from Doyle, one that perhaps avoids ranking with his very best due to its largely unobtrusive nature". Matt Goldberg of Collider stated "Patrick Doyle provides a great score".

== Track listing ==
All tracks are written by Patrick Doyle, except where indicated.

No.	Title	Writer(s)	Artist(s)	Length
1.	"The Wailing Wall"			1:43
2.	"Jaffa to Stamboul"			1:27
3.	"Arrival"			2:02
4.	"The Orient Express"			1:29
5.	"Departure"			1:01
6.	"Judgement"			2:29
7.	"Touch Nothing Else"			2:54
8.	"MacQueen"			2:20
9.	"Twelve Stab Wounds"			2:59
10.	"The Armstrong Case"			1:22
11.	"Mrs. Hubbard"			1:34
12.	"This is True"			2:52
13.	"Keep Everyone Inside"			1:24
14.	"Confession"			1:50
15.	"Geography"			1:25
16.	"One Sharp Knife"			2:24
17.	"Ma Katherine"			1:09
18.	"True Identity"			2:08
19.	"Dr. Arbuthnot"			1:54
20.	"It Is Time"			1:06
21.	"Justice"			9:30
22.	"Poirot"			2:40
23.	"Never Forget"	Doyle; Kenneth Branagh	Michelle Pfeiffer	3:58
24.	"Orient Express Suite"			3:20
Total length:				57:00

== Personnel ==
Credits adapted from liner notes:

- Music composer and producer – Patrick Doyle
- Programming – Will Temlett
- Recording, mixing and mastering – Nick Taylor
- Digital recording – Fiona Cruickshank
- Recording assistance – Alex Ferguson, Ashley Andrew-Jones
- Mixing assistance – Olly Thompson, Tom Bullen
- Temp music editor – Graham Sutton
- Music editor – Cécile Tournesac, Robin Morrison
- Track laying – Daniel Gadd
- MIDI engineer – Martin Higgins
- Music supervisor – Maggie Rodford
- Assistant music supervisor – Emily Appleton-Holley
- Copyist – Colin Rae
- Booklet editor and design – WLP Ltd
- Liner notes – Patrick Doyle

Soloists

- Cello – Richard Harwood
- Piano – Tammy L. Hall (rehearsal), Dave Arch, Patrick Doyle

Orchestra

- Orchestratator – James Shearman, Patrick Doyle
- Conductor – James Shearman
- Contractor – Hilary Skewes

Management

- Soundrack coordinator (20th Century Fox) – JoAnn Orgel
- Business affairs for (20th Century Fox) – Tom Cavanaugh
- Music clearance (20th Century Fox) – Ellen Ginsburg
- Licensing (Sony Classical Records) – Mark Cavell
- Product development (Sony Classical Records) – Klara Korytowska
- Executive in charge of music (20th Century Fox) – Danielle Diego
- Music management (20th Century Fox) – Brianne Porcaro
- Production supervisor (20th Century Fox) – Rebecca Morellato

== Accolades ==
Awards	Date of ceremony	Category	Recipient(s)	Result	Ref.
ASCAP Film and Television Music Awards	May 23, 2018	Top Box Office Films	Patrick Doyle	Won	
Houston Film Critics Society	January 6, 2018	Best Original Song	"Never Forget" – written by Patrick Doyle and Kenneth Branagh; performed by Michelle Pfeiffer	Nominated	
International Film Music Critics Association	February 22, 2018	Best Original Score for a Drama Film	Patrick Doyle	Nominated	
International Film Music Critics Association	February 22, 2018	Film Music Composition of the Year	Patrick Doyle – "Justice"	Nominated	
Phoenix Film Critics Society	December 19, 2017	Best Original Score	Patrick Doyle	Nominated	
