= Genre Films =

American film production company

- Industry: Film production
- Founded: 2010; 16 years ago
- Founder: Simon Kinberg
- Headquarters: United States
- Key people: Simon Kinberg; Aditya Sood

Genre Films, usually credited as Kinberg Genre, is an American film production company that was founded by filmmaker Simon Kinberg.

== History ==
Genre Films in April 2010 signed a first-look deal with 20th Century Fox, which gave Fox "direct access" to ideas by Kinberg.

Aditya Sood became president of production, and Josh Feldman became director of development.

In December 2013, Genre Films renewed its deal with Fox for three additional years.

In 2016, the studio made its first leap onto television when ABC picked up Designated Survivor to series.

In July 2019, it was announced that Kinberg and his Genre Films would be leaving Fox after 20 years.

== Filmography ==
=== Film ===
==== 2010s ====
Year	Title	Director	Distributor	Notes	Budget	Gross
2011	X-Men: First Class	Matthew Vaughn	20th Century Fox	uncredited; co-production with Marvel Entertainment, The Donners' Company, Bad Hat Harry Productions, Dune Entertainment and Ingenious Film Partners	$140–160 million	$353.6 million
2012	This Means War	McG	20th Century Fox	uncredited; co-production with Overbrook Entertainment and Robert Simonds Company	$65 million	$156.5 million
2012	Abraham Lincoln: Vampire Hunter	Timur Bekmambetov	20th Century Fox	uncredited; co-production with Bazelevs Company, Dune Entertainment and Tim Burton Productions	$99.5 million	$116.4 million
2013	Elysium	Neill Blomkamp	Sony Pictures Releasing	co-production with TriStar Pictures, Media Rights Capital, QED International and Alphacore	$115 million	$286.1 million
2014	X-Men: Days of Future Past	Bryan Singer	20th Century Fox	co-production with Marvel Entertainment, Bad Hat Harry Productions and The Donners' Company	$200–220 million	$747.9 million
2014	Let's Be Cops	Luke Greenfield	20th Century Fox		$17 million	$138.2 million
2015	Cinderella	Kenneth Branagh	Walt Disney Studios Motion Pictures	co-production with Walt Disney Pictures, Allison Shearmur Productions and Beagle Pug Films	$95–100 million	$542.4 million
2015	Chappie	Neill Blomkamp	Sony Pictures Releasing	co-production with Columbia Pictures, MRC and LStar Capital	$49 million	$102.1 million
2015	Fantastic Four	Josh Trank	20th Century Fox	co-production with Marvel Entertainment, Constantin Film, Marv Films, Robert Kulzer Productions, Hutch Parker Entertainment	$120–155 million	$167.9 million
2015	The Martian	Ridley Scott	20th Century Fox	co-production with Scott Free Productions	$108 million	$630.2 million
2016	Deadpool	Tim Miller	20th Century Fox	co-production with Marvel Entertainment and The Donners' Company	$58 million	$782.6 million
2016	X-Men: Apocalypse	Bryan Singer	20th Century Fox	co-production with Marvel Entertainment, Bad Hat Harry Productions, Hutch Parker Entertainment and The Donners' Company	$178 million	$543.9 million
2017	Logan	James Mangold	20th Century Fox	co-production with Marvel Entertainment, Hutch Parker Entertainment and The Donners' Company	$97–127 million	$619 million
2017	Murder on the Orient Express	Kenneth Branagh	20th Century Fox	co-production with The Mark Gordon Company and Scott Free Productions	$55 million	$352.8 million
2018	Deadpool 2	David Leitch	20th Century Fox	co-production with Marvel Entertainment, The Donners' Company and Maximum Effort	$110 million	$785.8 million
2019	Dark Phoenix	Simon Kinberg	20th Century Fox	co-production with Marvel Entertainment, The Donners' Company and Hutch Parker Entertainment	$200 million	$252.4 million

==== 2020s ====
Year	Title	Director	Distributor	Notes	Budget	Gross
2020	The New Mutants	Josh Boone	20th Century Studios	co-production with Marvel Entertainment and Sunswept Entertainment	$67–80 million	$49.1 million
2022	The 355	Simon Kinberg	Universal Pictures	co-production with Freckle Films and FilmNation Entertainment	$40–75 million	$27.9 million
2022	Death on the Nile	Kenneth Branagh	20th Century Studios	co-production with Scott Free Productions and The Mark Gordon Company	$90 million	$137.3 million
2023	A Haunting in Venice	Kenneth Branagh	20th Century Studios	co-production with The Mark Gordon Company and Scott Free Productions	$60 million	$122.3 million
2024	Lift	F. Gary Gray	Netflix	co-production with Hartbeat Productions and 6th & Idaho Productions	$100 million	—N/a
2024	Deadpool & Wolverine	Shawn Levy	Marvel Studios	uncredited; co-production with 21 Laps Entertainment and Maximum Effort	$200 million	$1.338 billion
2025	The Running Man	Edgar Wright	Paramount Pictures	co-production with Complete Fiction	$110 million	$69 million

==== Upcoming ====
Release date	Title	Director	Distributor	Notes
2027	The Take	Fernando Meirelles	Netflix	

=== Television ===
==== 2010's ====
Years	Title	Creators	Network	Notes	Seasons	Episodes
2016–2019	Designated Survivor	David Guggenheim	ABC (seasons 1-2); Netflix (season 3)	co-production with The Mark Gordon Company (seasons 1-2), Entertainment One, ABC Studios (seasons 1-2) and Baer Bones (season 3)	3	53
2017–2019	Legion	Noah Hawley based on Legion by: Chris Claremont; Bill Sienkiewicz	FX	co-production with 26 Keys Productions, The Donners' Company, Bad Hat Harry Productions (season 1), Marvel Television and FX Productions	3	27
2017–2019	The Gifted	Matt Nix based on X-Men by: Stan Lee; Jack Kirby	Fox	co-production with Flying Glass of Milk Productions, The Donners' Company, Bad Hat Harry Productions, Marvel Television and 20th Century Fox Television	2	29
2019–2020	The Twilight Zone	based on The Twilight Zone created by: Rod Serling developed by: Simon Kinberg; Jordan Peele; Marco Ramirez	CBS All Access	co-production with Monkeypaw Productions and CBS Television Studios	1	10

==== 2020's ====
Years	Title	Creators	Network	Notes	Seasons	Episodes
2021–present	Invasion	Simon Kinberg; David Weil	Apple TV+	co-production with Boat Rocker Media and Apple Studios (season 2)	2	20
2024–present	Sugar	Mark Protosevich	Apple TV+	co-production with Apple Studios, Protokino and Chapel Place Productions	1	8
2026	Maximum Pleasure Guaranteed	David J. Rosen	Apple TV+	co-production with Apple Studios and Counterpoint Studios	1	10
