= Vanessa Ifediora =

Irish actor

- Born: Belfast, Northern Ireland, UK
- Occupations: Actress, photographer, poet
- Years active: 2018–present

Vanessa Ifediora is an Irish actress, photographer, and poet. She is known for her roles in Belfast and Derry Girls.

== Early life ==
Ifediora was born in Belfast. She is of Irish and Nigerian heritage. Ifediora lived in Japan for a several years and speaks conversational Japanese. She has depression and maladaptive daydreaming, which she treated effectively with the medication escitalopram. She also took up photography to help with her recovery and is now a freelance photographer. Ifediora has spoken about the racism she experienced growing up in Belfast and later when living in Cork. She moved to Dublin in 2017, which she described as "a different world" where she encountered less racism. She now lives in Belfast.

== Career ==
Ifediora studied acting at the Irish Film Academy in Dublin. In 2020, Ifediora featured on the single Sowing Acorns by Emma Langford.

== Selected filmography ==
| Year | Title | Role |
|---|---|---|
| 2023 | A Haunting in Venice | Sister Maria Felicitas |
| 2023 | Royal Rendezvous | Dee |
| 2022 | Bloodlands | Judith Kenny |
| 2022 | Derry Girls | Laurie |
| 2022 | Conversations with Friends | Nurse |
| 2021 | Foundation | Imperial Herald |
| 2021 | Belfast | Miss Lewis |
| 2020 | The Deceived | Sonographer |
| 2020 | Miss & Missus | Aine |
| 2019 | Colour Blind | Annarose |
| 2018 | Feel | Interviewer |
