= Michael Green (writer) =

American television and film writer, as well as a comic book scripter

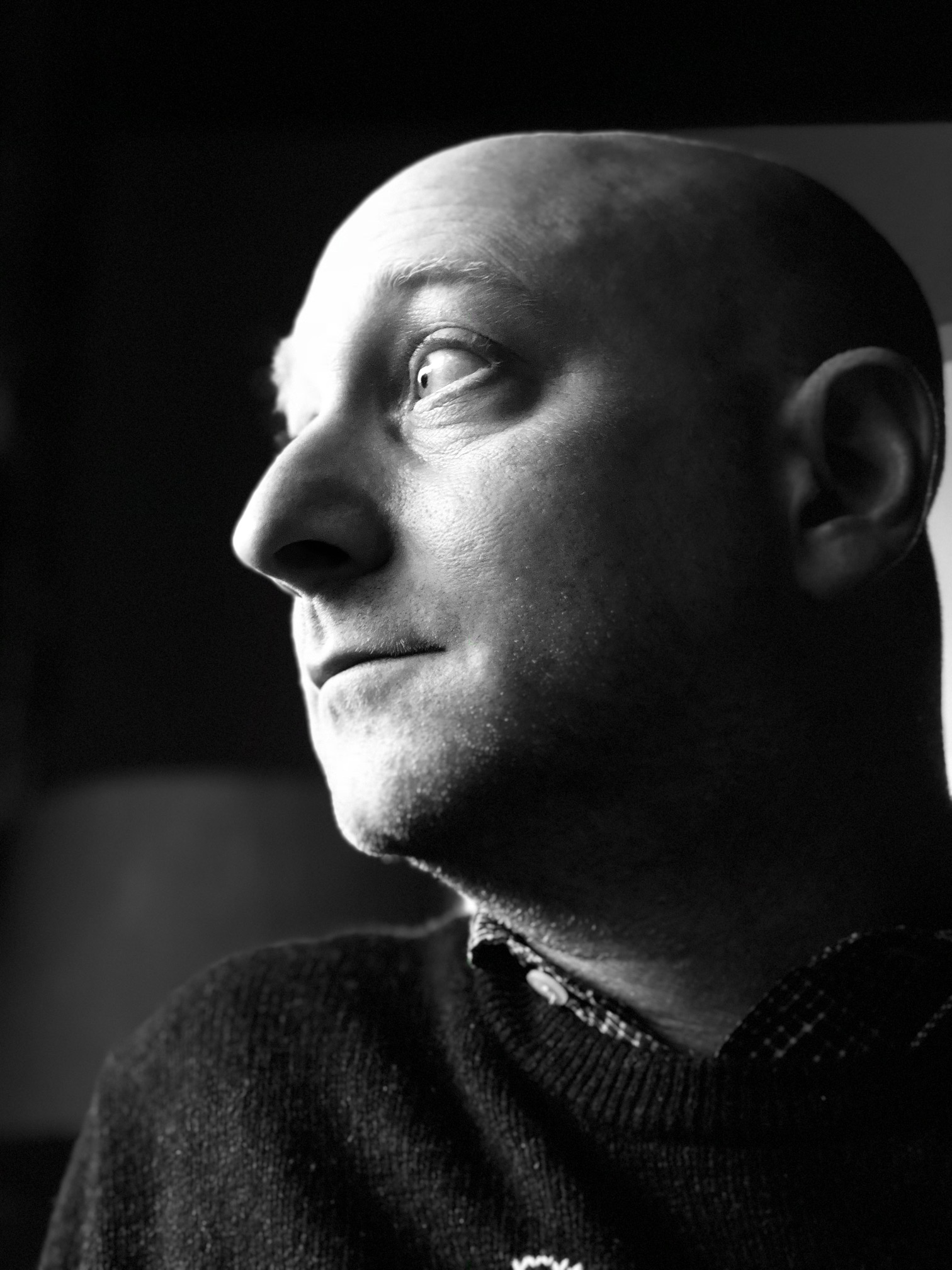
- Born: United States
- Occupations: Screenwriter; television writer; comic book writer
- Spouse: Amber Noizumi
- Writing career
- Language: English
- Genres: Film, television, comic books

Michael Green is an American writer and producer. In addition to writing for television and comic books, Green has written or co-written several feature film screenplays, including Logan, Alien: Covenant, Blade Runner 2049 (all 2017) and the Hercule Poirot film series (2017–present). For Logan, which he co-wrote with James Mangold and Scott Frank, Green was nominated for an Academy Award for Best Adapted Screenplay.

== Early life and education ==
Green grew up in Mamaroneck, New York, the son of a real estate developer. His family is Jewish, and his mother is Israeli. He attended Stanford University. After graduating, Green returned to New York and was hired for a junior development job at HBO, where he spent his workday reading other writers' scripts.

== Career ==
Green's first television writing credit was on Sex and the City. He was the creator and writer of the 2009 NBC series Kings, a drama based on the biblical story of King David but set in an alternate present. Other television credits also include Everwood, Smallville, Jack and Bobby and Heroes.

In 2007, Green, along with the rest of the Heroes writing staff, was nominated for an Emmy Award for Outstanding Drama Series and the WGA Award for New Series. Heroes won for Favorite New TV Drama at the 33rd People's Choice Awards.

In 2009, Green was hired by 20th Century Fox to pen an early draft of Fantastic Four with Akiva Goldsman producing.

Green's feature writing career began with Green Lantern in 2011. He wrote or co-wrote four films released in 2017: James Mangold's Logan, Ridley Scott's Alien: Covenant, Denis Villeneuve's Blade Runner 2049, and Kenneth Branagh's Murder on the Orient Express.

He developed, wrote and is an executive producer for the Starz series American Gods with Bryan Fuller. It is adapted from Neil Gaiman's novel of the same name.

Green later adapted two additional Agatha Christie mysteries, Death on the Nile (2022) and A Haunting in Venice (2023). As of November 2023 Green was a non-writing executive producer on Marvel Studios's Blade. In 2023, he signed an overall deal with Netflix and co-created the adult animated series, Blue Eye Samurai. Currently, Green is developing season two of Blue Eye Samurai with co-creator Amber Noizumi. In 2024, Blue Eye Samurai won six Annie Awards, an Artios Award and four Emmy awards including Outstanding Animated Program.

== Comic books ==
A contributor to DC Comics, Green is the author and co-author of several graphic novels, including Batman: Lovers and Madmen. He co-wrote Superman/Batman and the New 52 reboot of Supergirl, with Mike Johnson as well as the Blade Runner comic series Blade Runner 2019.

== Filmography ==
=== Television ===
Year	Title	Writer	Producer	Notes
1998	Sex and the City	Yes	No	1 episode
1998	Cupid	Yes	No	2 episodes
1999	Snoops	Yes	No	12 episodes; Also executive story editor
2001	First Years	No	co-producer	
2001–02	Smallville	Yes	Yes	21 episodes
2004–05	Jack & Bobby	Yes	consulting	21 episodes
2002–05	Everwood	Yes	Yes	66 episodes; Also supervising producer, and co-executive producer
2006–07	Heroes	Yes	co-executive	33 episodes
2009	Kings	Yes	executive	13 episodes Also creator
2012	The River	Yes	executive	12 episodes
2015	87th Academy Awards	Yes	No	TV special
2017–19	American Gods	Yes	executive	14 episodes Also developer
2019	Raising Dion	No	executive	9 episodes
2023–present	Blue Eye Samurai	Yes	executive	Also creator
2026	Blade Runner 2099	No	executive	Post-production

=== Film ===
Year	Title	Notes
2011	Green Lantern: Emerald Knights	Direct-to-video
2011	Green Lantern	
2017	Logan	Nominated for the Academy Award for Best Adapted Screenplay
2017	Alien: Covenant	Story only
2017	2036: Nexus Dawn	Short film
2017	Blade Runner 2049	
2017	Murder on the Orient Express	
2020	The Call of the Wild	
2021	Jungle Cruise	
2022	Death on the Nile	
2023	A Haunting in Venice	
2023	Extraction 2	Additional Literary Material (uncredited)
2024	Fly Me to the Moon	Additional Literary Material (uncredited)
2024	Carry-On	Additional Literary Material (uncredited)

== Awards and nominations ==
- 2007 Emmy Award: Outstanding Drama Series – Heroes, nomination shared with Tim Kring, (executive producer), Dennis Hammer (executive producer), Allan Arkush (executive producer), Greg Beeman (co-executive producer), Jesse Alexander (co-executive producer), Jeph Loeb (co-executive producer), Bryan Fuller (co-executive producer), Natalie Chaidez (co-executive producer), James Chory (produced by), Adam Armus (supervising producer), and Nora Kay Foster
- 2007 Writers Guild of America Award: New Series – Heroes
- 2018 Academy Awards: Best Adapted Screenplay nomination shared with James Mangold and Scott Frank for Logan
- 2024 Emmy Award: Outstanding Animated Program – Blue Eye Samurai: The Tale of the Ronin and the Bride (shared with Amber Noizumi, Erwin Stoff, Jane Wu, Nick Read and Michael Greenholt)
