= A Haunting in Venice =

2023 film by Kenneth Branagh

- North American theatrical release poster
- Directed by: Kenneth Branagh
- Screenplay by: Michael Green
- Based on: Hallowe'en Party by Agatha Christie
- Produced by: Kenneth Branagh; Judy Hofflund; Ridley Scott; Simon Kinberg
- Starring: Kyle Allen; Kenneth Branagh; Camille Cottin; Jamie Dornan; Tina Fey; Jude Hill; Ali Khan; Emma Laird; Kelly Reilly; Riccardo Scamarcio; Michelle Yeoh
- Cinematography: Haris Zambarloukos
- Edited by: Lucy Donaldson
- Music by: Hildur Guðnadóttir
- Production companies: Kinberg Genre; The Mark Gordon Company; Scott Free Productions; Agatha Christie Limited
- Distributed by: 20th Century Studios
- Release dates: 11 September 2023 (United Kingdom — Odeon Luxe Leicester Square); 15 September 2023 (United States)
- Running time: 103 minutes
- Countries: United Kingdom; United States
- Language: English
- Budget: $60 million
- Box office: $122.3 million

A Haunting in Venice is a 2023 British mystery supernatural horror film produced and directed by Kenneth Branagh from a screenplay by Michael Green, loosely based on the 1969 Agatha Christie novel Hallowe'en Party. The third installment of the Hercule Poirot film series, it is a sequel to the 2017 film Murder on the Orient Express and the 2022 film Death on the Nile. The ensemble cast includes Branagh reprising his role as Hercule Poirot, alongside Kyle Allen, Camille Cottin, Jamie Dornan, Tina Fey, Jude Hill, Ali Khan, Emma Laird, Kelly Reilly, Riccardo Scamarcio, and Michelle Yeoh.

A Haunting in Venice premièred at the Odeon Luxe Leicester Square cinema in London on 11 September 2023, and was subsequently released theatrically in the United States on 15 September by 20th Century Studios. The film received positive reviews from critics and grossed $122.3 million worldwide.

== Plot ==
In 1947, Hercule Poirot lives in retirement in post-war Venice, employing ex-police officer Vitale as a bodyguard. On Halloween, mystery writer Ariadne Oliver convinces Poirot to attend a séance at the palazzo of opera singer Rowena and expose medium Joyce Reynolds as a fraud. Rowena has hired Joyce to help her commune with her daughter Alicia, who reportedly committed suicide after her fiancé, chef Maxime, broke off their engagement. Among the guests in attendance are Maxime, Rowena's housekeeper Olga, Drake family doctor Leslie and his son Leopold, and Joyce's Romani assistant, Desdemona Holland.

During the séance, Poirot deduces that Joyce has two assistants, revealing Desdemona's half-brother Nicholas hiding in the chimney. Joyce suddenly speaks in Alicia's voice and reveals she was murdered by one of the guests. Poirot attempts to confront Joyce, who tells him to lighten up and gives him her mask and robe. Seconds after an unknown assailant nearly drowns Poirot when he is apple bobbing, Joyce is found impaled on a statue in the courtyard.

With a storm cutting off the palazzo, Poirot interviews the guests, during which he witnesses manifestations of Alicia's ghost and hears a young girl humming a tune. The investigation yields perplexing results:

- The severely traumatized war veteran Leslie is in love with Rowena.
- Maxime, who was not initially invited, broke off his engagement because Rowena did not approve of him, and Alicia was obsessed with keeping her mother happy.
- Leopold claims to hear voices from the spirits of children left to die of plague back when the palazzo was an orphanage, as well as the voice Poirot has been hearing. The spirits are said to haunt and kill any doctors or nurses who set foot within it.
- Joyce had served as a nurse during World War I.
- Nicholas and Desdemona have been stealing from Joyce and intend to use the money to travel to St. Louis, Missouri. Nicholas claims his showmanship was in support of Joyce's genuine visions, but Desdemona says it was all fake.

When the guests come across an underground chamber containing the skeletal remains of the dead children, Leslie suffers a panic attack and nearly kills Maxime. He is locked inside the music room to recover, Rowena giving Poirot the only key. After examining Maxime's invitation, Poirot deduces Oliver sent it and is conspiring with Vitale. Vitale, who investigated Alicia's death, gave Joyce private details, while Oliver had hoped to use Poirot's incapability of explaining the supernatural as a plot for her next book. Leslie is then found stabbed to death.

Gathering the remaining guests together, Poirot reveals Rowena is the murderer. Obsessed with keeping Alicia for herself, she cut her off from contact with Maxime after learning they planned to reconcile and used small amounts of poisonous honey to weaken and then care for her. One night, Olga unknowingly gave Alicia tea containing a fatal dose of the honey. Rowena, fearful of exposure, staged Alicia's suicide. When she began receiving blackmail threats, Rowena suspected either Joyce or Leslie. She pushed Joyce to her death after mistakenly attempting to drown Poirot and forced Leslie into stabbing himself via the palazzo's internal phone line by threatening to kill Leopold, hoping to pass off both deaths as part of the children's curse. When Poirot confronts Rowena on the roof, Alicia's ghost seems to appear to them both, pulling Rowena down off the building to her death.

As dawn breaks, Poirot ends his friendship with Ariadne, elects not to unmask Vitale's involvement in the séance, keeping him on as a bodyguard, and privately exposes Leopold as the blackmailer. Leopold explains he understood the poisoning signs his father missed, making the connection after realizing Rowena's first starring role was in an opera whose lead character is the "king of poisons". Poirot suggests Leopold and Olga clear their consciences by using the money to help the Holland siblings to start a new life in America. After noting the possibility of an afterlife, he then returns home to accept new cases.

== Cast ==
- Kyle Allen as Maxime Gérard, the former fiancé of Alicia Drake; Alicia mysteriously died after their broken engagement
- Kenneth Branagh as Hercule Poirot, a retired world-renowned Belgian detective
- Camille Cottin as Olga Seminoff, the Drake family's governess and housekeeper
- Jamie Dornan as Dr. Leslie Ferrier, a doctor suffering from psychological trauma
- Tina Fey as Ariadne Oliver, Poirot's friend and a crime novelist
- Jude Hill as Leopold Ferrier, Leslie's precocious son
- Ali Khan as Nicholas Holland, Joyce's assistant and Desdemona's younger half-brother
- Emma Laird as Desdemona Holland, Joyce's assistant and Nicholas's older half-sister
- Kelly Reilly as Rowena Drake, a retired opera singer and Alicia's mother
- Riccardo Scamarcio as Vitale Portfoglio, Poirot's bodyguard and a former police officer
- Michelle Yeoh as Joyce Reynolds, a supposed psychic medium

Additionally, Rowan Robinson stars as Alicia Drake, Rowena's deceased daughter; while Amir El-Masry portrays Alessandro Longo, a young man seeking Poirot's help; and Vanessa Ifediora plays Sister Maria Felicitas, a nun.

== Production ==
=== Development ===
The president of 20th Century Studios, Steve Asbell, revealed in March 2022 that a script for a third Hercule Poirot film had been written by Michael Green, with Branagh set to return as director and star. The film's plot was loosely based on Hallowe'en Party, a lesser-known late Poirot novel. The film was confirmed in October 2022, with Jamie Dornan, Tina Fey, Jude Hill, Kelly Reilly, and Michelle Yeoh in the main cast. Branagh described the film as a "supernatural thriller" rather than a full-fledged horror film.

=== Filming ===
Filming began on 31 October 2022, with production occurring on location Venice as well as on D and Q stages at Pinewood Studios.

=== Locations and sets ===
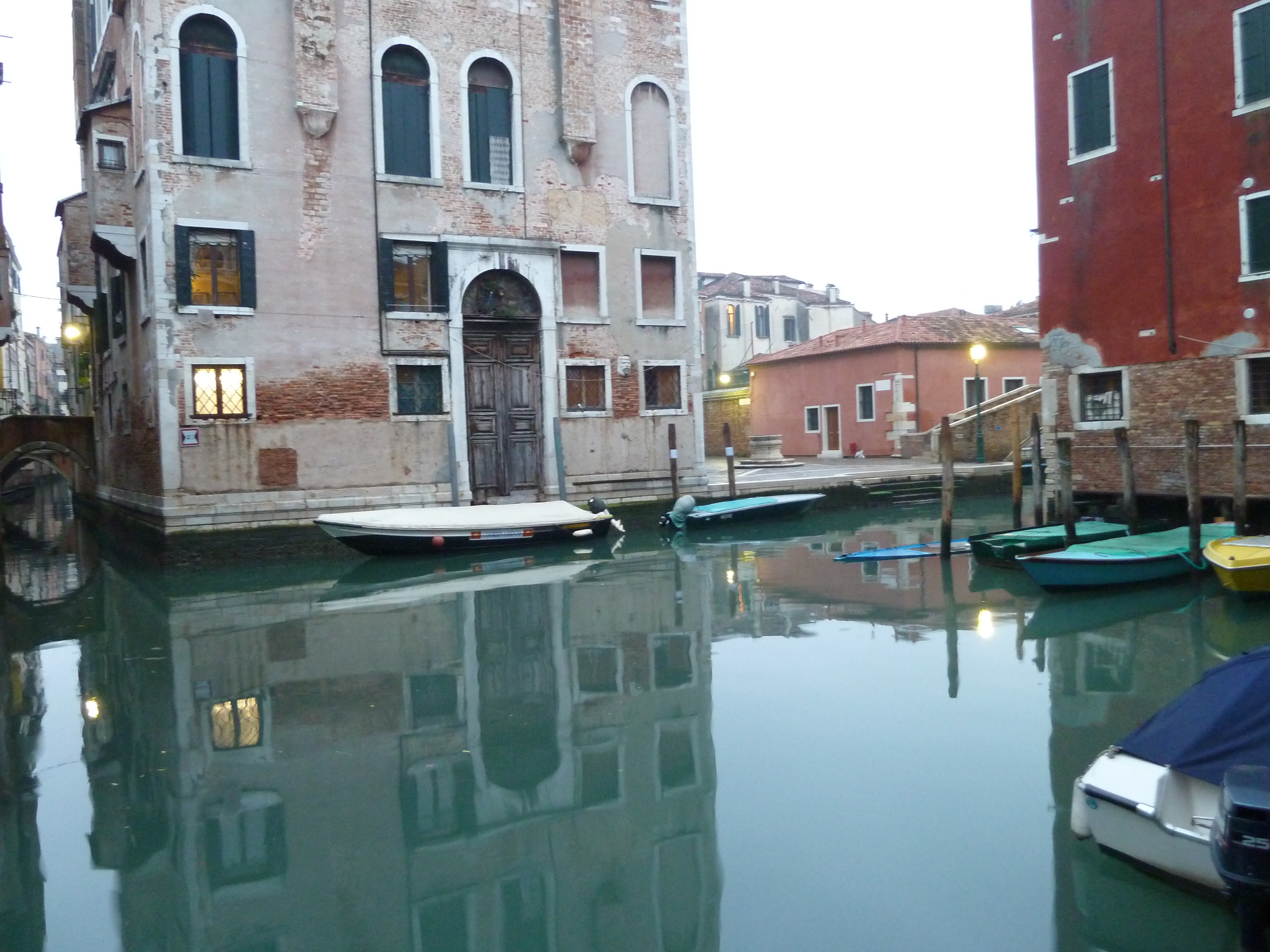
The real Campo San Boldo

For the haunted palazzo, a film set was built in Pinewood Studios, of the immediate surroundings of the palazzo, as well as all the interiors. For inspiration a number of real palaces were used, like the Doge's Palace, the Ca' Sagredo Hotel and the Palazzo Pisani Gritti, also a hotel. The piano nobile (or bel étage) of the building has a fresco inspired by The Wedding of Psyche, a painting by the Pre-Raphaelite artist Edward Burne-Jones. The set of the exterior of the palace was based on the Venetian square Campo San Boldo. Some nighttime scenes were actually shot at that location.

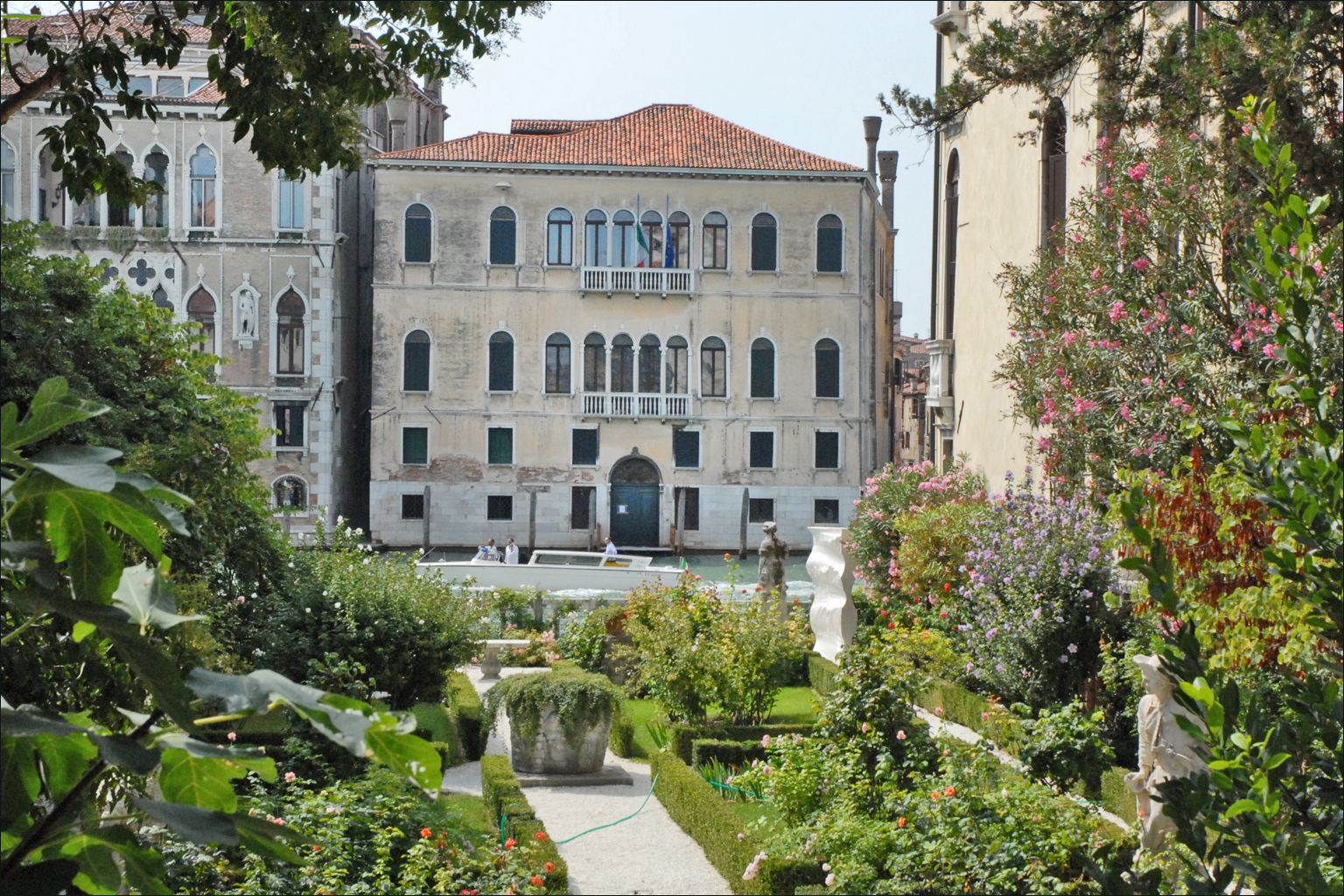
Garden of the Palazzo Malipiero, looking towards the Grand Canal

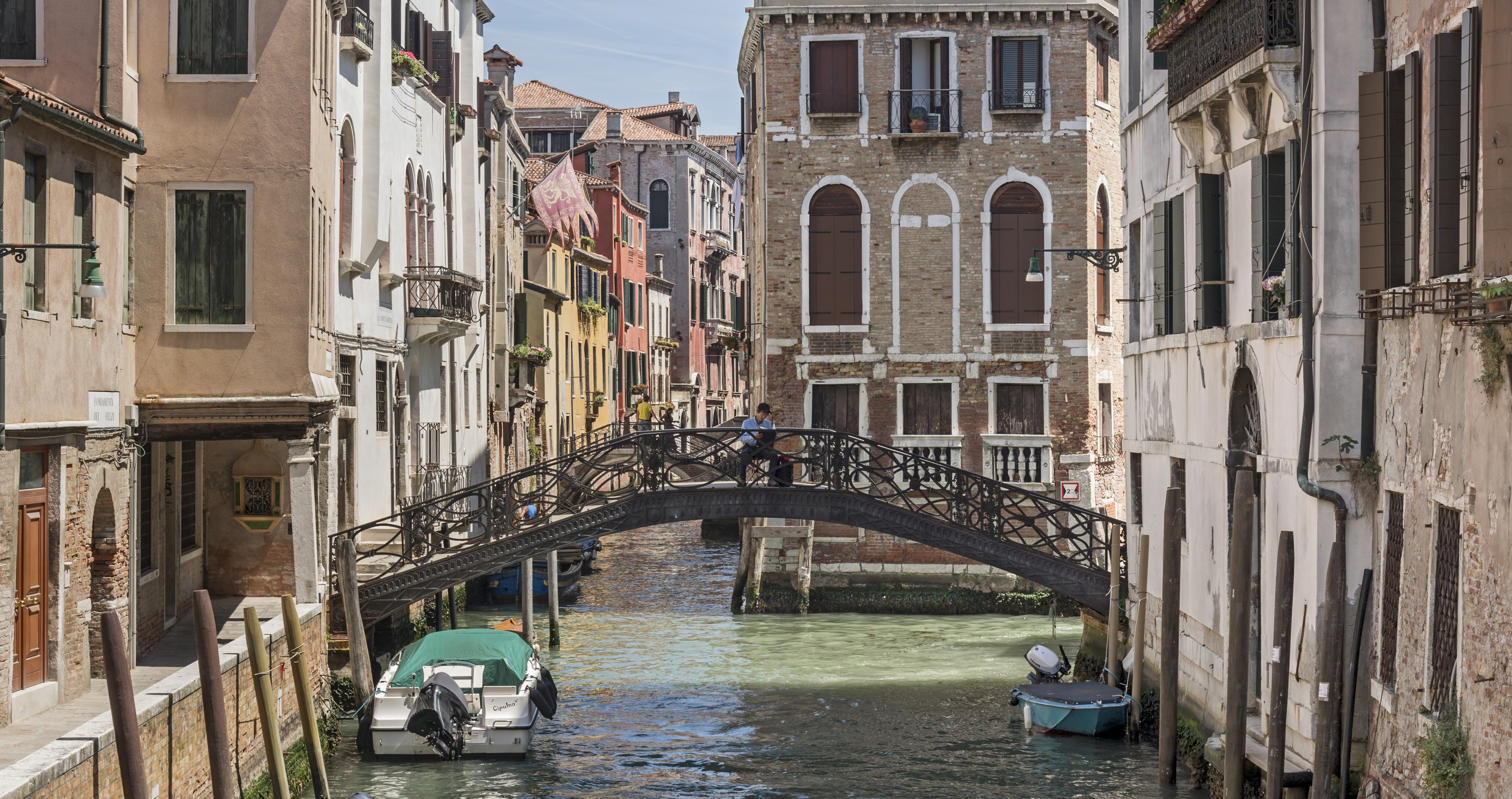
Ponte dei Conzafelzi

Another set of the palazzo was built in the English town of Reading. This was a one third scale model, to be used for scenes of water splashing against the palace.

The home of Poirot consisted of several locations. The roof terrace, which can be seen at the beginning and the end of the film, is part of the Venice Conservatory. The garden belongs to the Palazzo Malipiero. The Palazzo Malipiero is in the Campo San Samuele. Apart from the garden of the palace other exteriors can be seen in the film, for instance in the scene where Poirot tries to escape the crowd of potential clients waiting at his front door.

San Giorgio Maggiore Island was used for a market scene. The Campiello dei Miracoli and Campo Santa Maria Nova were used for the scene where Ariadne Oliver tries to entice Poirot to participate in a séance. The Piazza San Marco can be seen early in the film, just like the top bell and the figures of St Mark's Clocktower, also on the square.

The Grand Canal was used in the film as well as some of the smaller canals, like Rio dei Mendicanti and Rio del Pestrin. Poirot crosses the iron bridge, Ponte dei Conzafelzi, on this latter canal.

=== Music ===
Hildur Guðnadóttir composed the score for the film in April 2023, marking the first in the series not to be composed by Branagh's frequent collaborator Patrick Doyle. The film's soundtrack album was released by Hollywood Records on 15 September 2023.

== Release ==
=== Theatrical ===
A Haunting in Venice had its red carpet cinematic première at the Odeon Luxe Leicester Square at the West End London on 11 September 2023, but none of the cast members were in attendance due to the 2023 SAG-AFTRA strike. The film was released in the United States on 15 September by 20th Century Studios.

=== Home media ===
The film was released on digital platforms on 31 October, followed by a Blu-ray and DVD release on 28 November 2023.

A Haunting in Venice ranked No. 6 on iTunes and No. 3 on Vudu streaming services for the week ending 8 November. It debuted at No. 2 on the Official Film Chart in the UK for the week ending 8 November. The film later ranked No. 2 on the UK home entertainment sales chart for the week ending 22 November. The movie debuted at No. 8 on the overall disc sales chart and No. 11 on the Blu-ray chart for the week ending 2 December 2023. A Haunting in Venice generated 49% of its first-week unit sales from HD Blu-ray, as it did not have a 4K UHD disc release.

== Reception ==
=== Box office ===
A Haunting in Venice grossed worldwide a total of US$122.3 million. In the United Kingdom, it became the second highest-grossing horror film of 2023, grossing approximately US$12.5 million. In the United States and Canada, A Haunting in Venice grossed US$42.5 million. It was projected to gross around $12 million from 3,305 theaters in its opening weekend. The film made $5.5 million on its first day, including $1.2 million from Thursday night previews (up from Nile's $1.1 million). It went on to debut to $14.3 million, an improvement from Nile's $12.9 million opening, and finished second behind holdover The Nun II. The film made $6.3 million in its second weekend, finishing in third.

=== Critical response ===
United States

On the review aggregator website Rotten Tomatoes, 75% of 293 critics' reviews are positive, with an average rating of 6.5/10. The website's consensus reads: "A darker and spookier spin on Branagh's Poirot, A Haunting in Venice is a decent Hallowe'en snack whose undemanding mystery gets a lift from nifty visuals and an all-star cast." US aggregator Metacritic, which uses a weighted average, assigned the film a score of 63 out of 100, based on 52 critics, indicating "generally favorable" reviews. Audiences surveyed by CinemaScore gave the film an average grade of "B" on an A+ to F scale, same as the first two installments, while those polled at PostTrak gave it a 73% overall positive score, with 48% saying they would definitely recommend the film.

Jason Zinoman, writing for The New York Times, called the film a "whodunit with a splash of horror" and wrote: "In straddling genres, Haunting can get stuck in the middle. But there's fun to be had there. What's consistent is the elegant visuals – striking cinematography by Haris Zambarloukos – which mark this movie's real genre as lavish old-fashioned Hollywood entertainment." Justin Chang of the Los Angeles Times said: "What lingers from this movie isn't the usual assemblage of clues and red herrings [..] but a free-floating air of grief, much of it rooted in the characters' turbulent memories of the war just a few years earlier". Similar sentiment was echoed by Ann Hornaday of The Washington Post who described the film as "moody"; they both praised the cast's performances.

Matt Zoller Seitz acclaimed the screenplay, direction and production values and said: "Movies are rarely directed in this style anymore". He added that it was an "empathetic portrayal of the death-haunted mentality of people from Branagh's parents' generation". Seitz and critic Michael Phillips (the Chicago Tribune) named it best of Branagh's Hercule Poirot films. The latter found the cast's acting "pretty crafty".

Some critics pointed out that the film struggled in its character development. Kristen Lopez, writing for TheWrap, felt that almost all the characters were underdeveloped due to the attention given to the production values, but praised the performances, singling out Reilly, Dornan and Yeoh.

In a negative review, critic Caryn James found the film "uninvolving" and said: "The new film is much pokier in its pacing, with duller characters". She commended Branagh, Fey and Cottin's performances, while stating that so many actors in the cast were "sleepwalking". In an equally negative review, David Fear of Rolling Stone called the film "anemic and sluggish" and said audiences would be "bored to death."

United Kingdom and other territories

About the performances, Mark Kermode said: " [...] everyone is given a 110 percent but not in a completely scenery chewing fashion, in a way that mixes old-fashioned and newfangled". The Guardian's chief film critic Peter Bradshaw also thought the film wasted its cast, awarding it two out of five stars.

Saibal Chatterjee wrote for NDTV: "A Haunting In Venice, a couple of jump scares notwithstanding, may not chill you to the bones but as a story focused on the emotional and psychological fallout of a devastating war, it works brilliantly".

=== Accolades ===
Award	Date of ceremony	Category	Recipient(s)	Result	Ref.
British Film Designers Guild Awards	25 February 2024	Best Production Design – Major Motion Picture – Period	John Paul Kelly, Peter Russell and Celia Bobak	Won	
Hollywood Music in Media Awards	November 15, 2023	Original Score — Horror/Thriller Film	Hildur Guðnadóttir	Won	
International Film Music Critics Association Awards	22 February 2024	Best Original Score For a Horror/Thriller Film	Hildur Guðnadóttir	Nominated	
Las Vegas Film Critics Society	13 December 2023	Youth in Film (Male)	Jude Hill	Won	
San Diego Film Critics Society	19 December 2023	Best Performance by an Ensemble	The cast of A Haunting in Venice	Runner-up	
San Diego Film Critics Society	19 December 2023	Best Youth Performance (for a performer under the age of 18)	Jude Hill	Nominated	
Irish Film and Television Awards	April 20, 2024	Best Production Design	John Paul Kelly	Won	

== Future ==
In October 2024, executive producer James Prichard hinted at possible future installments, stating that much like A Haunting in Venice, future films could potentially break from the norm and add other elements besides the supernatural. "If Ken [Branagh] wants to do more, and Michael [Green] wants to write more, we'll certainly do another. There's a lot of material still to go, so we're not going to run out of inspiration."

That same month, 20th Century Studios boss Steve Asbell confirmed that other Agatha Christie stories will be adapted including And Then There Were None, The Witness for the Prosecution, and a Miss Marple film. In September 2026, Branagh expressed interest in adapting Hercule Poirot's Christmas.
