= Murder on the Orient Express (2017 film) =

2017 film by Kenneth Branagh

- Theatrical release poster
- Directed by: Kenneth Branagh
- Screenplay by: Michael Green
- Based on: Murder on the Orient Express by Agatha Christie
- Produced by: Ridley Scott; Mark Gordon; Simon Kinberg; Kenneth Branagh; Judy Hofflund; Michael Schaefer
- Starring: Tom Bateman; Kenneth Branagh; Penélope Cruz; Willem Dafoe; Judi Dench; Johnny Depp; Josh Gad; Derek Jacobi; Leslie Odom Jr; Michelle Pfeiffer; Olivia Colman; Daisy Ridley
- Cinematography: Haris Zambarloukos
- Edited by: Mick Audsley
- Music by: Patrick Doyle
- Production companies: Scott Free Productions; Kinberg Genre; The Mark Gordon Company
- Distributed by: 20th Century Fox
- Release dates: November 2, 2017 (Royal Albert Hall); November 10, 2017 (United States)
- Running time: 114 minutes
- Countries: United States; Malta
- Language: English
- Budget: $55 million
- Box office: $353 million

Murder on the Orient Express is a 2017 mystery film co-produced and directed by Kenneth Branagh from a screenplay by Michael Green, based on the 1934 novel of the same name by Agatha Christie. It is the first installment of the Hercule Poirot film series. The film stars an ensemble cast with Branagh as Hercule Poirot, alongside Tom Bateman, Penélope Cruz, Willem Dafoe, Judi Dench, Johnny Depp, Josh Gad, Derek Jacobi, Leslie Odom Jr, Michelle Pfeiffer, Olivia Colman, and Daisy Ridley. The plot follows Poirot, a world-renowned Belgian detective, as he investigates a murder on the luxury Orient Express train service in the 1930s.

Principal photography began in November 2016 in the United Kingdom; it is one of the few productions in recent decades to have used 65 mm film cameras. Murder on the Orient Express had its world premiere on November 2, 2017, at the Royal Albert Hall in London, and was released theatrically in the United Kingdom on November 3, 2017, and in the United States on November 10, 2017, by 20th Century Fox. The film grossed over $353 million worldwide and received mixed reviews from critics, with praise for the cast performances and production values, but criticism for the screenplay and redundancy to previous adaptations. Two sequels, Death on the Nile (2022) and A Haunting in Venice (2023), were released to improved critical reception but diminishing commercial performance.

== Plot ==
In 1934, famed Belgian detective Hercule Poirot solves a theft at the Church of the Holy Sepulchre in Jerusalem. Intending to return to London, his friend Bouc arranges accommodations for Poirot aboard the Simplon-route train, the Orient Express. Alongside Bouc, Poirot's fellow passengers include widow Caroline Hubbard; businessman Edward Ratchett, his manservant Edward Masterman and secretary Hector MacQueen; elderly Russian Princess Natalia Dragomiroff and her maid Hildegarde Schmidt; Hungarian diplomat Count Rudolf Andrenyi and his wife Elena; physician John Arbuthnot; Mary Debenham, a governess; Pilar Estravados, a Spanish missionary; Cuban-American car salesman Biniamino Marquez; and Gerhard Hardman, an Austrian university professor.

Having received threatening letters, Ratchett attempts to hire Poirot to protect him during the journey, but Poirot declines, not wanting to do business with a suspicious character. An avalanche derails the train's engine, stranding the passengers until a rescue crew can re-rail the locomotive. During the night, Poirot is awakened by strange noises in the hall next to his cabin and sees someone in a red kimono rushing down the aisleway. Ratchett is found murdered the following morning, stabbed a dozen times.

Poirot and Bouc work together to hunt the murderer. Poirot discovers the burned remnants of one of Ratchett's threatening notes, and from it deduces that Ratchett was really John Cassetti, the man responsible for the kidnap and murder of Daisy Armstrong, an infant child. Daisy's death caused her mother, Sonia, to go into premature labour, killing her and the baby, and out of grief her father, Colonel John Armstrong, killed himself. The family maid, Susanne, accused of complicity in Daisy's murder, also committed suicide.

Poirot finds a bloodstained handkerchief with a monogrammed "H", and a conductor uniform button in Mrs. Hubbard's cabin, leading him to find the uniform and kimono planted in his suitcase. Hubbard is later stabbed from behind and cannot identify the culprit. Poirot's interrogations of the passengers identifies direct connections between them and the Armstrong family. While interviewing Debenham, Poirot is shot in the shoulder by Arbuthnot, who confesses to the murder; Bouc incapacitates him before he can kill Poirot. However, Poirot quickly surmises that Arbuthnot, a former skilled army sniper, deliberately missed a killing shot.

Poirot gathers and confronts the passengers outside the train, uncovering their true identities:

- MacQueen's district attorney father was pressured into prosecuting Susanne, but his career was destroyed when she was posthumously exonerated.
- Hardman, in actuality a former police officer named Cyrus, was in love with Susanne.
- Pierre Michel, the train's conductor, was Susanne's brother.
- Arbuthnot and the terminally ill Masterman were Colonel Armstrong's comrades.
- Marquez, Schmidt, and Estravados worked for the Armstrongs as their chauffeur, cook, and nursemaid respectively.
- Countess Andrenyi is Sonia's sister, Helena.
- Debenham was Daisy's and Helena's governess.
- Dragomiroff was Daisy's godmother.
- Hubbard is actually Linda Arden, a former stage actress, Sonia's and Helena's mother, and Daisy's grandmother.

Poirot concludes that they murdered Cassetti together, each stabbing him once. Hubbard takes the blame for planning the murder and recruiting the others. Debenham wore the kimono and Arbuthnot superficially stabbed Hubbard to mislead Poirot. Agreeing their cause was just, but compelled to tell the truth, Poirot challenges the passengers to shoot him dead so they will get away with the murder. Instead, Hubbard grabs the gun and attempts suicide, but realises it is unloaded; Poirot was testing the suspects' characters.

With the locomotive back on the tracks, Poirot surmises that justice is impossible in this case, as Cassetti deserved death. For the first time, Poirot must live with a lie and imbalance. He presents the lone escaped killer theory to the Yugoslavian police, allowing the others to remain on the train. As he disembarks, a British Army messenger delivers a note asking him to investigate a death on the Nile.

== Cast ==
- Tom Bateman as Bouc, Poirot's friend and nephew of the owner of the Orient Express
- Kenneth Branagh as Hercule Poirot, a world-renowned Belgian detective and former police officer
- Penélope Cruz as Pilar Estravados, the Armstrongs' Spanish nurse. The character replaces the Swedish nurse, Greta Ohlsson, and assumes the name of an unrelated character from Hercule Poirot's Christmas.
- Willem Dafoe as Cyrus Bethman Hardman, who initially pretends to be an Austrian university professor named Gerhard Hardman, but is later revealed to be the American lover of Susanne Michel, the Armstrongs' maid who committed suicide after being wrongly accused of killing Daisy.
- Judi Dench as Princess Natalia Dragomiroff, Daisy Armstrong's godmother and close friend of Arden
- Johnny Depp as Edward Ratchett, revealed to be a notorious gangster, John Cassetti, who kidnapped and murdered Daisy Armstrong
- Josh Gad as Hector MacQueen, Ratchett's secretary, whose father was the prosecutor of Susanne Michel, the Armstrongs' maid.
- Derek Jacobi as Edward Henry Masterman, Ratchett's valet/butler and former valet to Col. Armstrong.
- Leslie Odom Jr. as Dr Arbuthnot, Debenham's secret lover, who was an army sniper and Col. Armstrong's close friend. (This character is an amalgamation of two characters from the novel, Col. Arbuthnot and Dr Constantine.)
- Michelle Pfeiffer as Caroline Hubbard, revealed to be the noted actress Linda Arden, who is the mother of Sonia Armstrong and Helena Andrenyi, and Daisy Armstrong's grandmother
- Daisy Ridley as Mary Debenham, a governess who was Sonia Armstrong's personal secretary and Daisy's governess
- Marwan Kenzari as Pierre Michel, the conductor and brother of Susanne, the Armstrongs' maid.
- Olivia Colman as Hildegarde Schmidt, the maid of the princess and the former cook for the Armstrongs
- Lucy Boynton as Countess Helena Andrenyi (née Goldenberg), Sonia Armstrong's younger sister
- Manuel Garcia-Rulfo as Biniamino Marquez, a car salesman and the Armstrong chauffeur. (This character replaces Antonio Foscarelli.)
- Sergei Polunin as Count Rudolph Andrenyi, Helena's husband

Additionally, Phil Dunster and Miranda Raison portray Daisy's parents, Col. John and Sonia Armstrong seen in a flashback scene.

== Production ==
=== Development ===
20th Century Fox announced the project in December 2013. Michael Green wrote the screenplay for a new film adaptation of Murder on the Orient Express. On 16 June 2015, it was reported Fox was in talks with Kenneth Branagh to direct. On 20 November 2015, it was announced that Branagh would both direct the film and star in the role of detective Hercule Poirot. He later said that he "enjoyed finding the sort of obsessive-compulsive in [Poirot] rather than the dandy."

In June 2016, Angelina Jolie entered into "talks" to join the cast of the film, in the role of Mrs Caroline Hubbard. However, it was later reported that Jolie had passed on the role and that Charlize Theron, among others, was in consideration for the role. In August 2016, Leslie Odom Jr joined the cast. In September 2016, Tom Bateman, Johnny Depp, Michelle Pfeiffer, Daisy Ridley, Michael Peña, Judi Dench, Lucy Boynton and Derek Jacobi joined the cast. In October 2016, Josh Gad and Marwan Kenzari joined the cast. In November 2016, Penélope Cruz joined the cast. In December 2016, Sergei Polunin joined the cast. In January 2017, Willem Dafoe and Manuel Garcia-Rulfo joined the cast with the latter replacing Peña, who had dropped out of the project.

=== Filming ===
Principal photography on the film began on November 22, 2016, in the United Kingdom, and concluded in May 2017. It used some of the same 65 mm film cameras as Christopher Nolan's Dunkirk, which Branagh had acted in shortly before the production. The two were among the very few to be shot on 65 mm film since Branagh's Hamlet in 1996, and the only ones released in 2017. While in post-production, Branagh "was Skyped in from thousands of miles away" to watch Pfeiffer record an original song called "Never Forget" for the film's finale. "As soon as we added it on to the end of the film, it joined seamlessly and gave a moment of reflection and consideration that the film needed and wanted," said Branagh.

=== Prop train ===
The film featured a meticulously-crafted prop train, built specifically for the movie. This prop train, a replica of the French SNCF steam train, included an engine, tender, restaurant car, baggage car, and a salon with a bar. It was constructed and dressed to withstand the filming process, including movement on the tracks and intricate tracking shots. After filming, the prop train was purchased and repurposed into a tearoom experience in the Lake District, offering dining and a unique glimpse into the film's set design.

== Release ==
A first look at the film and cast was released on May 3, 2017, in an exclusive article by Entertainment Weekly.

Murder on the Orient Express was released in the United Kingdom on November 3, 2017, and in the United States on November 10, 2017, by 20th Century Fox. The film was released on digital HD on February 20, 2018, and on Ultra HD Blu-ray, DVD and Blu-ray on February 27, 2018.

== Reception ==
=== Box office ===
Murder on the Orient Express grossed worldwide a total of US$353 million against a production budget of US$55 million.

In North America, Murder on the Orient Express grossed US$103 million. It was released alongside Daddy's Home 2, and was projected to gross around $20 million from 3,341 cinemas in its opening weekend. The film made $10.9 million on its first day, including $1.6 million from Thursday night previews at 2,775 cinemas. It ended up grossing $28.7 million, finishing third at the box office, behind holdover Thor: Ragnarok, and Daddy's Home 2. On the film's opening weekend, 51% of the audience was over the age of 35. In its second weekend, the film took in $13.8 million (a drop of 51.9%), finishing fifth, behind Justice League, Wonder, Thor: Ragnarok and Daddy's Home 2.

=== Critical response ===
Murder on the Orient Express received mixed reviews from critics. On review aggregator Rotten Tomatoes, the film has an approval rating of 60% based on 301 reviews, with an average rating of 6.1/10. The website's critical consensus reads: "Stylish production and an all-star ensemble keep this Murder on the Orient Express from running off the rails, even if it never quite builds up to its classic predecessor's illustrious head of steam." On Metacritic the film has a weighted average score of 52 out of 100, based on 46 critics, indicating "mixed or average reviews". Audiences polled by CinemaScore gave the film an average grade of "B" on an A+ to F scale.

Leah Greenblatt of Entertainment Weekly gave the film a B+, calling it "a lushly old-fashioned adaptation wrapped in a veritable turducken of pearls, monocles, and international movie stars." Blake Goble of Consequence of Sound said, "Handsomely staged, exceptionally well-cast, and reasonably faithful, Branagh has revived Murder on the Orient Express in a highly pleasing fashion." Trace Thurman of Bloody Disgusting gave the film three and a half skulls and said, "For those looking for an involving murder mystery that is respectful of its source material and filled with an all-star cast, look no further than Murder on the Orient Express." Matt Goldberg of Collider gave the film a B−, calling it a "handsomely crafted production," albeit one that "falls apart at the climax of the film." Jo Livingstone of The New Republic praised the film's "stylized gorgeousness," but wrote that Branagh's change of "Poirot's fussiness ... into obsessive compulsive tendencies" was "less distinct and, ultimately, less interesting".

On the negative side, Matthew Jacobs of The Huffington Post was impressed by the cast, but ultimately felt "Agatha Christie's whodunit has no steam." Peter Travers of Rolling Stone found that there were many dull moments and that the film was a needless remake. Richard Roeper of the Chicago Sun-Times gave the film two and a half stars, and stated that he felt it focused too much on Poirot to the detriment of the other characters, adding, "Never let it be said the director misses an opportunity to place his star front and center, unfortunately relegating just about everyone else in the obligatory international all-star cast to a paper-thin character with one or at most two defining personality traits." Ignatiy Vishnevetsky of The A.V. Club rated the film a C+ and complained that Branagh's "erratic direction—more interested in cut glass and overhead shots than in suspicions and uncertainties—bungles both the perfect puzzle logic of the crime and its devious solution." Christopher Orr of The Atlantic said the film was "visually sumptuous yet otherwise inert" and summed up, "Murder on the Orient Express is not a bad movie per se, merely one that feels self-indulgent and thoroughly unnecessary."

=== Accolades ===
Award	Date of ceremony	Category	Recipient(s)	Result	Ref(s)
Art Directors Guild Awards	January 27, 2018	Excellence in Production Design for a Period Film	Jim Clay	Nominated	
Costume Designers Guild	February 20, 2018	Excellence in Period Film	Alexandra Byrne	Nominated	
Critics' Choice Movie Awards	January 11, 2018	Best Production Design	Jim Clay & Rebecca Alleway	Nominated	
Empire Awards	March 18, 2018	Best Make-up and Hairstyling	Murder on the Orient Express	Nominated	
Houston Film Critics Society	January 6, 2018	Best Original Song	"Never Forget"	Nominated	
London Film Critics Circle	January 28, 2018	British/Irish Actress of the Year	Judi Dench	Nominated	
Satellite Awards	February 11, 2018	Best Costume Design	Alexandra Byrne	Nominated	
Saturn Awards	June 27, 2018	Best Thriller Film	Murder on the Orient Express	Nominated	
Seattle Film Critics Society	December 18, 2017	Best Production Design	Jim Clay & Rebecca Alleway	Nominated	
Teen Choice Awards	August 12, 2018	Choice Drama	Murder on the Orient Express	Nominated	
Teen Choice Awards	August 12, 2018	Choice Drama Actor	Leslie Odom Jr.	Nominated	
Teen Choice Awards	August 12, 2018	Choice Drama Actress	Daisy Ridley	Nominated	

== Sequels ==
=== Death on the Nile ===
In 2015, Christie's great-grandson James Prichard, chairman of Agatha Christie Limited, expressed enthusiasm for sequels, citing the positive collaboration with Branagh and the production team. In May 2017, Branagh expressed interest in further installments if the film were successful. On 20 November 2017, 20th Century Fox announced that a sequel, Death on the Nile, based on the Christie's 1937 novel, was in active development, with Michael Green, screenwriter of the first film, returning to write the script.

Death on the Nile underwent several delays, due in part to Disney's acquisition of 20th Century Fox and the COVID-19 pandemic. Other than Branagh, only Bateman returned from the first film to play Bouc again. The cinematic release was on 11 February 2022.

=== A Haunting in Venice ===
20th Century Studios president Steve Asbell confirmed in March 2022 that a third installment was in development. A Haunting in Venice was officially announced 10 October 2022, as an adaptation of the 1969 Hallowe'en Party, "one of the lesser-known novels" by Christie, relocated to post-war Venice.

Branagh returned to direct and star as Poirot, with Michael Green returning as screenwriter. The film starred a new cast of Kyle Allen, Camille Cottin, Jamie Dornan, Tina Fey, Jude Hill, and Michelle Yeoh, amongst others. Production began in November 2022, and the film was released on 15 September 2023.
