= Belfast (film) =

2021 film by Kenneth Branagh

- Theatrical release poster
- Directed by: Kenneth Branagh
- Written by: Kenneth Branagh
- Produced by: Laura Berwick; Kenneth Branagh; Becca Kovacik; Tamar Thomas
- Starring: Caitríona Balfe; Judi Dench; Jamie Dornan; Ciarán Hinds; Colin Morgan; Jude Hill
- Cinematography: Haris Zambarloukos
- Edited by: Úna Ní Dhonghaíle
- Music by: Van Morrison
- Production companies: Northern Ireland Screen; TKBC
- Distributed by: Focus Features (United States); Universal Pictures (International)
- Release dates: 2 September 2021 (Telluride); 21 January 2022 (United Kingdom)
- Running time: 97 minutes
- Countries: United Kingdom; United States
- Language: English
- Budget: $10–15 million
- Box office: $49 million

Belfast is a 2021 coming-of-age film written and directed by Kenneth Branagh. The film stars Caitríona Balfe, Judi Dench, Jamie Dornan, Ciarán Hinds, Colin Morgan and Jude Hill in his feature film debut. The film, which Branagh has described as his "most personal", follows a young boy's childhood in Belfast, Northern Ireland, at the beginning of The Troubles in 1969.

Belfast had its world premiere at the 48th Telluride Film Festival on 2 September 2021; shortly thereafter, it won the People's Choice Award at the 2021 Toronto International Film Festival. The film was released in the United States on 12 November 2021 by Focus Features, and in the United Kingdom and Ireland on 21 January 2022, by Universal Pictures. It received generally positive reviews from critics for Branagh's direction and screenplay, cinematography, and the performances of the cast, and grossed $49 million worldwide.

The film received seven nominations at the 94th Academy Awards, including Best Picture, winning for Best Original Screenplay. It was named one of the best films of 2021 by the National Board of Review and tied with The Power of the Dog for a leading seven nominations at the 79th Golden Globe Awards, including Best Motion Picture – Drama, and won for Best Screenplay. It also tied with West Side Story for a leading eleven nominations at the 27th Critics' Choice Awards, including Best Picture, and also received six nominations at the 75th British Academy Film Awards, winning Outstanding British Film.

== Plot ==
Buddy is a nine-year-old boy living with his family—mother "Ma", elder brother Will, and paternal grandparents "Granny" and "Pop"—in Belfast, while his father "Pa" works overseas in England. During the August 1969 riots, a group of Protestant loyalists attack the homes and businesses of Catholics on Buddy's street. The residents of the street set up a barricade to prevent further conflict and Pa returns home from England to check up on the family's wellbeing. The family attends church, where the minister delivers a harsh fork in the road speech; the rhetoric is continually reflected upon by Buddy throughout the film. Buddy develops feelings for a fellow high-achieving classmate, Catherine, a Catholic, and they eventually become friends.

Local criminal and sectarian rabble-rouser Billy Clanton approaches Pa demanding his involvement in "the cause"; when Pa refuses, Billy becomes aggressive and incessantly approaches Buddy. Meanwhile, the family struggles to pay off their accumulated tax bill. Pa dreams of emigrating to Sydney or Vancouver, a prospect met with distress from Ma. However, she can no longer deny the option of leaving Belfast as the conflict worsens and Pa is offered a promotion and housing deal in England from his employers. At Christmas, they attempt to discuss the matter with the boys, but Buddy breaks down at the thought of leaving.

Buddy and his cousin Moira attempt to steal chocolates from a sweet shop, but the plan goes awry. When later questioned by the police, he does not reveal his co-conspirators. Following this, Moira recruits him into her local gang, who turn out to be Ulster loyalists that loot a supermarket during a riot. A reluctant Buddy is coerced into stealing a box of laundry detergent before he returns home and informs Ma of his activities. Ma berates him and drags both Buddy and Moira back to the looting to return their stolen items.

Billy then appears and takes Ma and Buddy hostage as leverage for his escape. Pa and Will arrive, as does the British army, which has come to end the riot. This initiates a standoff with Billy, who attempts a shootout until Pa and Will disarm him, at which point he is arrested and swears retribution. When realising that they are no longer safe in Belfast, the family decides to leave for England. Before they do so, Pop dies after a period in hospital. Before departing, Buddy bids farewell to Catherine. He later wonders whether he could have pursued a future with her despite her being a Catholic. Pa responds that it would not make any difference as far as he was concerned. As Granny watches, the family boards a bus for the airport, Granny silently encouraging them to go forward towards the future and not to look back.

== Cast ==
- Jude Hill as Buddy
- Caitríona Balfe as "Ma", Buddy's mother
- Jamie Dornan as "Pa", Buddy's father
- Judi Dench as "Granny", Buddy's grandmother
- Ciarán Hinds as "Pop", Buddy's grandfather
- Lewis McAskie as Will, Buddy's older brother
- Colin Morgan as Billy Clanton
- Lara McDonnell as Moira
- Michael Maloney as Frankie West
- Olive Tennant as Catherine
- Gerard Horan as Mackie
- Josie Walker as Aunt Violet
- Turlough Convery as Minister
- Vanessa Ifediora as Miss Lewis
- Conor MacNeill as McLaury
- Drew Dillon as Mr Kavanagh
- Victor Alli as Soldier
- Gerard McCarthy as Bobby Frank
- Ian Dunnett Jnr as Uncle Tony
- John Sessions as Joseph Tomelty playing Jacob Marley
- Mark Hadfield as George Malpass playing Ebenezer Scrooge
- Serrana Su-Ling Bliss as Sharon Nicholas

== Production ==
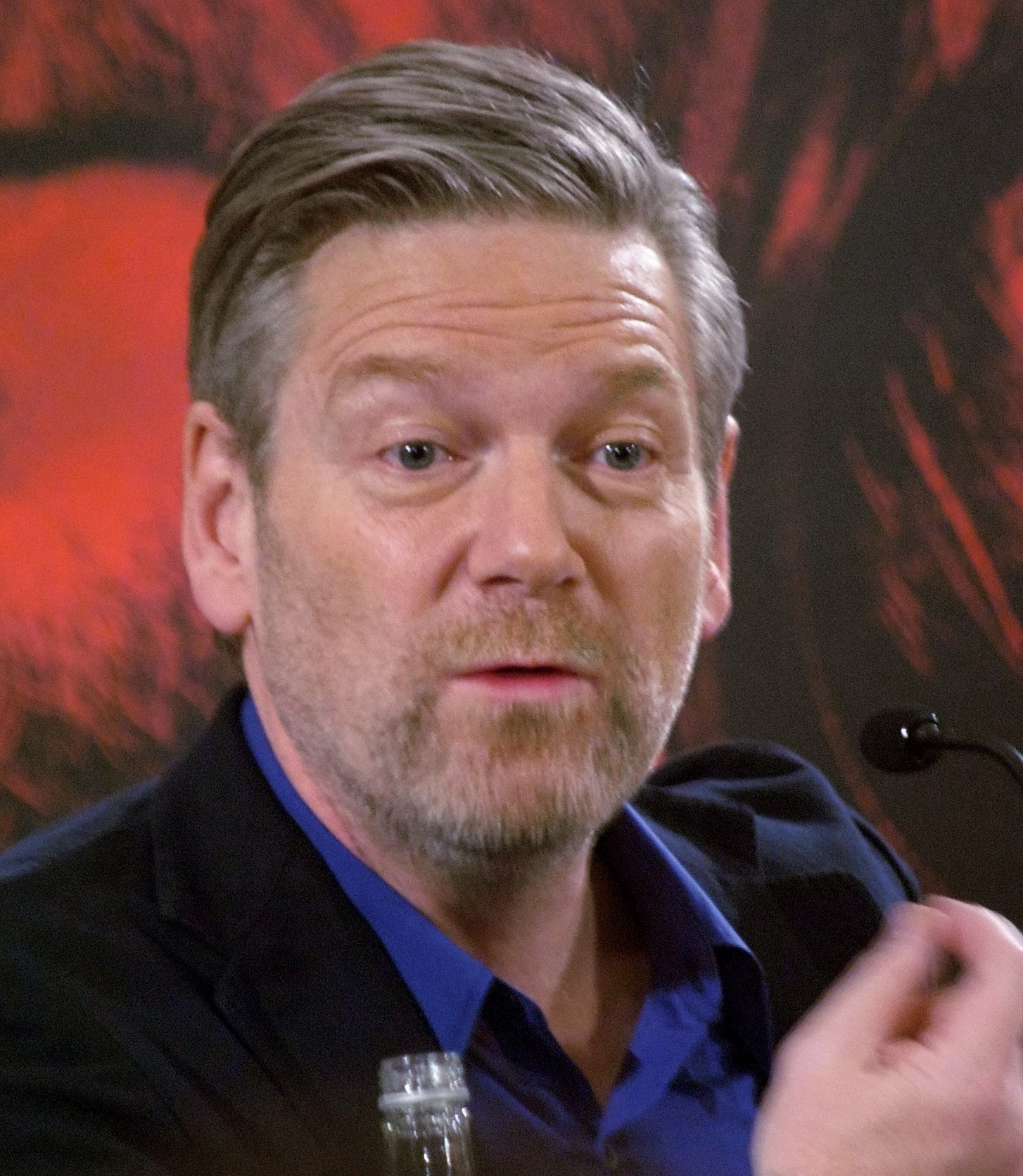
Writer, director and co-producer Kenneth Branagh

Kenneth Branagh started working on the film in March 2020. In July 2020, Branagh announced that he would write and direct the film. In September 2020, Judi Dench, Caitríona Balfe, Jamie Dornan, Ciarán Hinds and Jude Hill joined the cast of the film.

=== Filming ===
Principal photography began in September 2020 during the COVID-19 pandemic. Filming initially took place in and around London before moving to Belfast. The entire film was shot in seven weeks. Production concluded by October 2020.

Belfast was shot digitally using the large format Arri Alexa Mini LF camera and Panavision System 65 lenses. The film was shot in colour and converted to black-and-white in post-production. Cinematographer Haris Zambarloukos had a preference for shooting in colour as it enables greater flexibility in the colour correction process. Zambarloukos said the decision that a majority of the film would be in black-and-white was made because it "filters out any unnecessary noise" and "lifts the veil on the soul a little bit better than color can", for it allows actor performances to be brought to the forefront. Natural light was used during photography, a break from the more complicated lighting setups director Kenneth Branagh had worked with on prior larger studio films. Zambarloukos was inspired by cinematographer Joseph Walker's use of slightly increased exposure to allow for increased contrast in black-and-white photography.

=== Music ===
The film features music by Belfast native Van Morrison, including the score he composed, dominated by electric guitar and saxophone, eight of his classic songs, and a new song he wrote for the film, "Down to Joy". It is Branagh's first film since Peter's Friends not to be composed by Patrick Doyle.

== Release ==
Belfast had its world premiere at the Telluride Film Festival on 2 September 2021, where it became the festival's most often-screened film of that year. It also screened at the 2021 Toronto International Film Festival on 12 September 2021, where it won the People's Choice Award. By the end of its run, it was screened at film festivals in Chicago, Hamburg, London, Middleburg, Mill Valley, Philadelphia, San Diego and Vancouver. It held its Los Angeles premiere at the Academy Museum of Motion Pictures on 8 November 2021. The film was released on 12 November 2021 through Focus Features in the United States, and on 21 January 2022 in Ireland and the United Kingdom through Universal Pictures.

Belfast was then released on digital download on iTunes and Amazon Prime Video on 8 February 2022; this was followed by a Blu-ray and DVD release on 1 March 2022 in the United States by Universal Pictures Home Entertainment (through Studio Distribution Services LLC) and on 25 April 2022 in the United Kingdom by Warner Bros. Home Entertainment.

== Reception ==
=== Box office ===
Belfast grossed $49 million worldwide, with over $19 million coming from the UK. The United States and Canada were the film's largest international markets, with a combined gross of $9.3 million.

The film had a strong debut in the UK and Ireland, opening in second place just behind Spider-Man: No Way Home, with £2.2 million. It was the eighth-widest release of all time in the territory, and was the top film at 412 of the 705 locations it played at. It performed especially well in the Republic of Ireland and Northern Ireland, which accounted for 20 per cent of its total takings. Its location average in Northern Ireland was £8,801, compared to £3,121 across the rest of the market. In its seventh weekend, Belfast surpassed the £14.4 million gross of Schindler's List, to become the highest-grossing black-and-white film of the modern era. The film ultimately grossed £15.6 million in the UK and Ireland.

In the US and Canada, Belfast was projected to gross around $1 million from 588 cinemas in its opening weekend. It went on to debut to $1.8 million, finishing eighth at the box office. It averaged $3,111 per-venue, one of the best of figures of 2021 for an indie total; 73% of the audience was over 35. In its second weekend the film fell 47% to $940,000. The film made $1.3 million over the five-day Thanksgiving frame, including $958,770 in its third weekend, finishing eleventh. In its twelfth weekend, the film had an expansion to 200 theatres, grossing an estimated $120,000.

In the weekend after earning six BAFTA nominations, the film grossed $3.23 million from seven markets. The following weekend, the film earned $2.2 million from seven markets.

=== Critical response ===
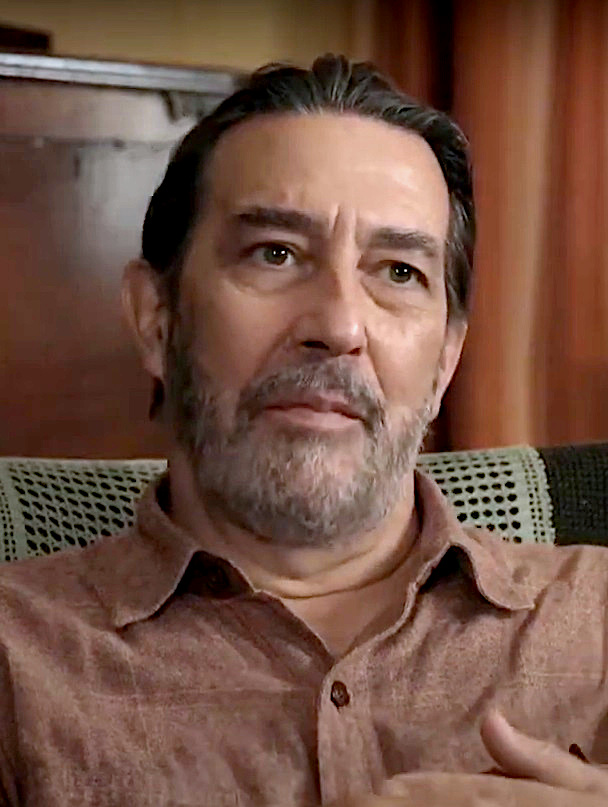
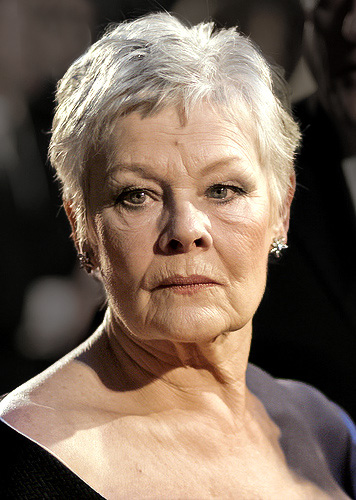
Ciarán Hinds and Judi Dench received Academy Award nominations for Best Supporting Actor and Actress for their performances.

On the review aggregator website Rotten Tomatoes, the film holds an approval rating of 86% based on 330 reviews, with an average rating of 7.80/10. The website's critics consensus reads: "A deeply personal project for writer-director Kenneth Branagh, Belfast transcends its narrative deficits with powerful performances and directorial craft." On Metacritic, the film has a weighted average score of 75 out of 100, based on 55 critics, indicating "generally favorable reviews". Audiences polled by CinemaScore gave the film an average grade of "A−" on an A+ to F scale, while 79% of filmgoers at PostTrak said they would definitely recommend it.

Reviewing the film, Kevin Maher of The Times gave it 5/5 stars and wrote: "It's a film of formal beauty, letter-perfect performances, complex and textured writing (also from Branagh) and enough comedic one-lines and Van Morrison musical montages to make you forget that you are watching a drama about seething sectarian hatreds". Peter Bradshaw of The Guardian also gave the film 5/5 stars and addressed it as "a seductive piece of myth-making from Branagh". Writing for TheWrap, Steve Pond praised the performances of Dornan and Balfe, and said: "The film feels true in the way it must be exploring Branagh's memories of a tumultuous and confusing time, and the way it pays tribute to a vibrant community as that community is irrevocably changed." Stephanie Zacharek of Time said that it was hard to resist the film's affectionate energy. Leah Greenblatt of Entertainment Weekly said that "Branagh's genuine affection and nostalgia for his subject suffuse the movie; if only the misty romanticism of his story could match it" and gave the film a "B−" score.

David Ehrlich of IndieWire, who gave the film a "C" grade, wrote: "It was the best of times, it was the worst of times, and this scattershot crowd-pleaser renders them both in such broad strokes that it seems as if Branagh can only imagine the Belfast of his youth as a brogue-accented blend of other movies like it."

Filmmaker Simon Curtis praised the film, saying "It is a film about pain that comes with emigration, but there is a joyous quality to Belfast, and seeing so many of Ken [Branagh]’s frequent collaborators on both sides of the camera, the sense of a family making the film bounces off the screen as well."

=== Accolades ===
At the 2021 Toronto International Film Festival, the film won the People's Choice Award. At the Middleburg Film Festival, the Best Narrative Feature award went to Belfast. Kenneth Branagh won for Best Screenplay at the 79th Golden Globe Awards. The film won the Outstanding British Film Award at the 75th BAFTA Awards.

At the 94th Academy Awards, the film was nominated for seven Academy Awards, including Best Picture, Best Director, Actor in a Supporting Role (for Hinds) and Actress in a Supporting Role (for Dench). At the age of 87, Judi Dench became the second oldest nominee in the category of Best Supporting Actress for her performance, after Gloria Stuart was nominated in the same category for her role in Titanic (1997). Branagh became the first person to have been nominated in a total of seven different categories with his nominations in the Best Picture and Best Original Screenplay categories for his work on the film.
