= Ali Khan (British actor) =

British actor (born 2001)

- Born: 18 May 2001 (age 25); Nottingham, England
- Education: King's College London
- Years active: 2017–present

Ali Khan (born 18 May 2001) is a British actor. On television, he is known for his role in the BBC Three series Red Rose (2022) and the Channel 4 sitcom Everyone Else Burns (2023). His films include A Haunting in Venice (2023).

== Early life and education ==
Khan was born in Nottingham and began taking acting classes at the Television Workshop at the age of 9. His family roots lie in Poonch, Azad Kashmir, Pakistan. He attended Trent College, where he was a Drama Scholar and completed A Levels in Politics, Geography, and History in 2019. He went on to graduate from King's College London in 2022 with a Bachelor of Arts in History, being personally impacted by Dr Reza Zia-Ebrahimi's seminars on Race, Orientalism and Islamophobia.

== Career ==
In 2017, Khan made his feature film debut in Pin Cushion starring Joanna Scanlan and Lily Newmark. He later made his television debut in 2022 with a main role as Tariq "Taz" Sadiq in the BBC Three horror series Red Rose, as well as guest appearances in the Paramount+ series Halo and the Sky Comedy series Rosie Molloy Gives Up Everything. He also appeared in the Netflix film The School for Good and Evil as Chaddick.

The following year, Khan played Joshua in the Channel 4 sitcom Everyone Else Burns and Nicholas Holland alongside Emma Laird as Desdemona Holland in Kenneth Branagh's film A Haunting in Venice.

== Filmography ==
=== Film ===
Year	Title	Role	Notes
2017	Pin Cushion	Callum	
2018	The Things We Do	Zahir	Short film
2019	6 Underground	Attack Helper	
2022	The School for Good and Evil	Chaddick	Netflix film
2023	A Haunting in Venice	Nicholas Holland	
2025	Brides	Samir	
2025	Peak Male Excellence	Rohan	Short film

=== Television ===
Year	Title	Role	Notes
2022	Halo	Attu	Episode: "Homecoming"
2022	Red Rose	Tariq "Taz" Sadiq	Main role
2022	Rosie Molloy Gives Up Everything	Freddy	1 episode
2023–present	Everyone Else Burns	Joshua	Main role
2024	Showtrial	Mani Malik-Cohen	5 episodes
2026	Grace	Jayden Siddiqui	1 episode
