= Death on the Nile (2022 film) =

2022 film by Kenneth Branagh

- Theatrical release poster
- Directed by: Kenneth Branagh
- Screenplay by: Michael Green
- Based on: Death on the Nile by Agatha Christie
- Produced by: Ridley Scott; Kenneth Branagh; Judy Hofflund; Kevin J. Walsh
- Starring: Tom Bateman; Annette Bening; Kenneth Branagh; Russell Brand; Ali Fazal; Dawn French; Gal Gadot; Armie Hammer; Rose Leslie; Emma Mackey; Sophie Okonedo; Jennifer Saunders; Letitia Wright
- Cinematography: Haris Zambarloukos
- Edited by: Úna Ní Dhonghaíle
- Music by: Patrick Doyle
- Production companies: Scott Free Productions; Kinberg Genre; Mark Gordon Pictures
- Distributed by: 20th Century Studios
- Release dates: February 9, 2022 (France and South Korea); February 11, 2022 (United Kingdom and United States)
- Running time: 127 minutes
- Countries: United Kingdom; United States
- Language: English
- Budget: $90–100 million
- Box office: $137.3 million

Death on the Nile is a 2022 mystery film directed by Kenneth Branagh from a screenplay by Michael Green, based on the 1937 novel of the same name by Agatha Christie, and the second big screen adaptation of Christie's novel, following the 1978 film.

As a sequel to Murder on the Orient Express (2017) and the second installment of the Hercule Poirot film series, it was produced by Branagh, Ridley Scott, Judy Hofflund, and Kevin J. Walsh. It stars an ensemble cast with Branagh and Tom Bateman reprising their roles as Hercule Poirot and Bouc, respectively, alongside Annette Bening, Russell Brand, Ali Fazal, Dawn French, Gal Gadot, Armie Hammer, Rose Leslie, Emma Mackey, Sophie Okonedo, Jennifer Saunders, and Letitia Wright.

Death on the Nile was released in the United Kingdom and the United States on February 11, 2022, after several delays due to the COVID-19 pandemic. The film received mixed reviews from critics and grossed $137.3 million. A sequel, A Haunting in Venice, followed in 2023. Branagh once again directed and starred as Poirot.

== Plot ==
Flashback to Belgium at the Yser Bridge on October 31, 1914, in the front lines of World War I. Hercule Poirot's captain has been given a mission considered certain death for all of his men. Poirot suggests his captain follow a strategy that will accomplish the mission safely. It succeeds, but when his captain steps on a mine, Poirot is caught in the explosion. His fiancée Katherine visits him in the hospital, who reassures him that she still loves him despite his facial injury and that he can grow a moustache to conceal it.

In 1937, at a London club, Poirot watches blues singer Salome Otterbourne perform. He notices Jacqueline "Jackie" de Bellefort introducing her fiancé Simon Doyle to her childhood friend heiress Linnet Ridgeway. After meeting Simon, Linnet agrees to hire him as her land agent.

Six weeks later, in Egypt, Poirot encounters his friend Bouc with Bouc's mother Euphemia, all of whom attend the wedding of Linnet and Simon. Others join their honeymoon trip: Linnet's maid Louise Bourget; Salome and her niece/manager Rosalie, Linnet's schoolfriend; Linnet's godmother Marie Van Schuyler with her nurse Mrs. Bowers; Linnet's financial manager and cousin Andrew; and Linnet's former fiancé Dr. Linus Windlesham. Jackie has also stalked the couple to Egypt and continues to follow the couple around.

To escape Jackie, the group boards the cruise ship S.S. Karnak. Linnet asks Poirot for protection from Jackie and confesses that she distrusts her guests. Bouc reveals he is dating Rosalie, despite his mother's disapproval, and teases Poirot about his attraction to Salome.

The party disembarks from the Karnak to visit the Abu Simbel Temples. After a boulder falls off a column and nearly crushes Linnet and Simon, the guests return to the Karnak to discover Jackie has boarded. When Linnet goes to sleep, Simon confronts her, who shoots him in the leg. When she attempts to shoot herself, Rosalie and Bouc intervene, taking Jackie to Mrs. Bowers. Windlesham treats Simon.

The following morning, Louise discovers Linnet has been shot in the head and her valuable necklace has been stolen. Poirot, assisted by Bouc, interrogates the guests, each of whom bears a vendetta against Linnet or would benefit from her death. The area around the boat is dredged and the murder weapon is found, wrapped in Van Schuyler's scarf. Poirot also reveals that Euphemia hired him to investigate Rosalie. When Rosalie storms off, she discovers Louise's body with money and her throat slit. Poirot suspects Louise blackmailed Linnet's killer.

Poirot and Simon interrogate Bouc. He found Linnet dead and stole her necklace to gain financial freedom from his mother, but panicked, putting it in Euphemia's belongings. Bouc witnessed Louise's murder, but as he is about to reveal the killer, he is fatally shot through the throat. Poirot chases the hooded killer, who escapes, leaving behind only the gun.

Locking the remaining guests in the boat's saloon, Poirot reveals that Simon killed Linnet, with Jackie as the mastermind. They are still lovers and arranged Simon's romance with Linnet to inherit her wealth. Simon drugged Poirot's champagne, and Jackie shot a blank at Simon, who faked his injury with paint stolen from Euphemia. While Jackie distracted Bouc and Rosalie, Simon killed Linnet, returned to the saloon, and shot his own leg, muffled by the scarf. Jackie later killed Louise with Windlesham's scalpel and Bouc with Andrew's gun.

A final piece of evidence is the handkerchief used in the fake shooting, recovered along with the gun, which has faded to pink instead of brown, proving the stains are not blood. Faced with Poirot's irrefutable proof, Jackie embraces Simon, shooting him through the back and thus killing them both with one shot. As the passengers disembark, Poirot is unable to voice his feelings to Salome.

Six months later, a clean-shaven Poirot visits Salome's club to watch her rehearse.

== Cast ==
- Tom Bateman as Bouc, Hercule Poirot's friend
- Annette Bening as Euphemia, a renowned painter and Bouc's mother
- Kenneth Branagh as Hercule Poirot, a world-renowned Belgian detective
- Russell Brand as Linus Windlesham, a doctor and Linnet's former fiancé
- Ali Fazal as Andrew Katchadourian, Linnet's cousin and financial manager
- Dawn French as Mrs. Bowers, Marie Van Schuyler's nurse and lover
- Gal Gadot as Linnet Ridgeway-Doyle, a wealthy heiress and Simon's wife
- Armie Hammer as Simon Doyle, Linnet's husband and Jackie's lover
- Rose Leslie as Louise Bourget, Linnet's personal maid
- Emma Mackey as Jacqueline "Jackie" de Bellefort, Simon's scorned ex-lover and Linnet's ex-friend
- Sophie Okonedo as Salome Otterbourne, a renowned jazz singer
- Jennifer Saunders as Marie Van Schuyler, Linnet's godmother and a socialite-turned-communist
- Letitia Wright as Rosalie "Rosie" Otterbourne, Salome's niece and business manager
- Susannah Fielding as Katherine, Poirot's lover who is killed during World War I

== Production ==
=== Development ===
In 2015, Christie's great-grandson James Prichard, chairman of Agatha Christie Limited, expressed enthusiasm for sequels, citing the positive collaboration with Branagh and the production team. In May 2017, Branagh expressed interest in further installments if the first film were successful. On November 20, 2017, it was announced that 20th Century Fox was developing Death on the Nile as a sequel to their version of Murder on the Orient Express with Michael Green returning to pen the script and Kenneth Branagh set to return as Poirot, and as the film's director.

In September 2018, Gal Gadot joined the cast. That same month, Paco Delgado was hired to design the costumes. In October 2018, Armie Hammer joined the cast, and Tom Bateman was confirmed to reprise his role as Bouc for the film. In January 2019, Jodie Comer had joined the cast. In April 2019, Letitia Wright joined the cast. Annette Bening was in talks to join in June. Russell Brand joined the cast in August 2019. Ali Fazal, Dawn French, Rose Leslie, Emma Mackey, Sophie Okonedo and Jennifer Saunders were added in September, with Comer not being involved.

=== Filming ===
Principal photography began on September 30, 2019, at Longcross Studios in Surrey, England. The film was supposed to be filmed in Morocco instead of Egypt, but filming took place only in England.

A boat was recreated, as well as Abu Simbel. A replica of the Tiffany Yellow Diamond was used for the film. Shooting lasted until December 18, 2019.

=== Post-production ===
Úna Ní Dhonghaíle served as the editor for Death on the Nile. Double Negative (DNEG) provided the visual effects for the film, with Academy Award-winning special effects artist George Murphy as the overall visual effects supervisor. Additional VFX were provided by Lola VFX and Raynault VFX.

=== Music ===
In January 2019, Patrick Doyle, a frequent collaborator on Branagh's films (including the film's predecessor), was announced as the composer for the film. The singing voice of Salome in the nightclub scenes is voiced by Sister Rosetta Tharpe and Mavis Staples.

== Release ==
=== Theatrical ===
The film had its world premiere in France and South Korea on February 9, 2022. After having been rescheduled several times owing to the COVID-19 pandemic, Death on the Nile was theatrically released on February 11, 2022, by 20th Century Studios. The film was originally set to be released on December 20, 2019, before being rescheduled to October 9, 2020, due to production issues. It was then pushed back two weeks to October 23, and again to December 18, in response to the domestic box office underperformance of Tenet during the COVID-19 pandemic. In November 2020, the studio removed the film, along with Free Guy, from its upcoming release schedule until further notice. The next month, the film was rescheduled to September 17, 2021. In March 2021, it was then moved to the current February 2022 date. The film was banned in Lebanon and Kuwait due to Gadot's former association with the Israel Defense Forces. The film was allowed to be released in Saudi Arabia and Tunisia. The film was released in China on February 19, 2022, making it the first Hollywood blockbuster to be released in the Chinese market after The Matrix Resurrections, which was released on January 14, 2022.

=== Marketing ===
Disney spent $18 million on television commercials promoting the film by the time it premiered in theaters. The film's promotion was complicated by the sexual assault allegations against Armie Hammer and to a lesser extent by the anti-vaccine stances of Russell Brand and Letitia Wright. Vanity Fair described the film's "P.R. Journey" as a "nightmare". Hammer did no promotional interviews, appeared only briefly in the trailer and, unlike other cast members, was not featured on an individual character poster.

Social media analytic RelishMix said the film had a social media reach of 217.9 million interactions, "at social norms for a campaign that began 18 months ago in August 2020 and wrestled with Covid re-dates and other headline news, such as Armie Hammer." Deadline Hollywood said Disney's marketing campaign was "anchored on a socially media quiet Gadot, who was more active during Red Notice."

=== Home media ===
Death on the Nile released digitally on March 29, 2022, and on Blu-ray, DVD, and Ultra HD Blu-ray on April 5 by 20th Century Studios Home Entertainment. The film was subsequently released on Hulu and HBO Max on March 29, 2022.

On iTunes and Vudu, Death on the Nile ranked sixth for the week ending April 4, 2022, following its premium digital release on March 29. For the week ending April 11, the film ranked fifth on the iTunes chart, eighth on the Google Play chart, and tenth on the Vudu chart. On physical media, the film debuted at No. 5 on the NPD VideoScan First Alert chart and No. 4 on the Blu-ray Disc chart for the week ending April 9. Of its total unit sales, 56% were in HD formats, with 45% from regular Blu-ray and 11% from 4K Ultra HD. Overall, it ranked eighth on the top 10 list of physical-media sales for April 2022, according to the NPD Group's VideoScan tracking service.

The streaming aggregator Reelgood, which tracks real-time data from 20 million U.S. users for original and acquired content across SVOD and AVOD services, reported that Death on the Nile was the most-streamed film during the week of April 6, 2022. JustWatch, a guide to streaming content with access to data from more than 20 million users around the world, announced that it was the second most-streamed film in the U.S. from April 4–10. Whip Media, which tracks viewership data for the more than 25 million worldwide users of its TV Time app, reported that Death on the Nile was the most-streamed film in the U.S. for the week ending April 10.

== Reception ==
=== Box office ===
Death on the Nile grossed $45.6 million in the United States and Canada, and $91.6 million in other territories, for a worldwide total of $137.3 million.

In the United States and Canada, Death on the Nile was released alongside Marry Me and Blacklight, and was projected to gross $11–17 million from 3,280 theaters in its opening weekend. The film grossed $12.9 million in its opening weekend, finishing first at the box office. Overall audiences during its opening were 51% male, 77% above the age of 25, 47% above 35, and 28% above 45. The ethnic breakdown of the audience showed that 57% were Caucasian, 15% Hispanic and Latino Americans, 13% African American, and 15% Asian or other. The film made $6.6 million in its second weekend, and $4.5 million in its third, placing fourth both times. The film earned $2.75 million in its fourth weekend, $2.4 million in its fifth, and $1.65 million in its sixth. The film dropped out of the box office top ten in its seventh weekend, finishing eleventh with $630,520.

Outside the U.S. and Canada, the film grossed $20.7 million in its opening weekend from 47 international markets. The film opened in China on February 19, 2022. It opened poorly in the country, finishing fourth behind three Chinese holdovers with $5.9 million. Including its Chinese debut, the film earned $19.8 million in its second international weekend. It made an additional $10.6 million from 47 markets in its third weekend, crossing the $100 million mark worldwide, $5.1 million in its fourth, $3 million in its fifth, and $1.6 million in its sixth.

=== Critical response ===
The film received mixed reviews. On the review aggregator website Rotten Tomatoes, 62% of 291 critics' reviews are positive, with an average rating of 5.9/10. The website's consensus reads: "Old-fashioned to a fault, the solidly entertaining Death on the Nile is enlivened by its all-star cast and director-star Kenneth Branagh's obvious affection for the material." Metacritic, which uses a weighted average, assigned the film a score of 52 out of 100, based on 51 critics, indicating "mixed or average" reviews. Audiences polled by CinemaScore gave the film an average grade of "B" on an A+ to F scale, the same as its predecessor, while those at PostTrak gave it a 77% positive score, with 57% saying they would definitely recommend it.

David Rooney of The Hollywood Reporter wrote: "For some of us who look back with affection on John Guillermin's lush 1978 screen version, there's a nagging feeling throughout that Branagh, while hitting the marks of storytelling and design, has drained some of the fun out of it." Owen Gleiberman of Variety called the film "a moderately diverting dessert that carries you right along. It never transcends the feeling that you're seeing a relic injected with life serum, but that, in a way, is part of its minor-league charm." Edward Porter of The Times gave the film three out of five stars, saying that its "gaudy style — combined with the melodrama of the script's modified take on Christie's plot — remains diverting even if some of the supposedly Egyptian backdrops look phoney." Sandra Hall of The Sydney Morning Herald gave the film four out of five stars, writing: "While the gamble Branagh takes in disinterring Poirot's long-neglected sensitive side may be regarded as sacrilege by some, I think it works. Poirot has a yearning heart." Emily Zemler of The Observer, wrote the film had some "palpable tension in the first half...audiences [wait] for something bad to happen, but by the time it actually does more interesting themes" were present. She praised its "old-fashioned panache."

Wendy Ide, also of The Observer, gave the film two out of five stars, writing: "The camera whirls giddily, dizzy from the sparkle and spectacle, but not quite able to conceal the fact that this is an empty bauble of a movie." David Fear of Rolling Stone wrote that the film "has its joys and flaws apart from that Armie factor, but it's almost like trying to assess whether the appetizer course could have been slightly undercooked while an elephant stampedes over the whole dinner table." Joe Morgenstern of The Wall Street Journal wrote that the film "has pizazz and period style in the same way today's big-brand toothpastes have flavor – artificial ingredients give them a taste that's discernible, but too generic to name."

=== Online reception ===
Gal Gadot's delivery of the line "enough champagne to fill the Nile" in one scene became a popular Internet meme. Haaretz's Nissan Shor said of the scene, "This ridiculous statement is inadvertently made with exaggerated pomposity; it's campy, recited in a robotic manner lacking self-awareness, which leaves one no choice but to burst out laughing."

=== Accolades ===
Year	Award	Category	Nominee(s)	Result	Ref.
2022	Saturn Awards	Best Action / Adventure Film	Death on the Nile	Nominated	
2022	People's Choice Awards	Drama Movie of 2022	Death on the Nile	Nominated	
2022	People's Choice Awards	Drama Movie Star of 2022	Gal Gadot	Nominated	
2022	People's Choice Awards	Female Movie Star of 2022	Gal Gadot	Nominated	
2023	Visual Effects Society Awards	Outstanding Supporting Visual Effects in a Photoreal Feature	Death on the Nile	Nominated	
2023	ASCAP Film and Television Music Awards	Top Box Office Films	Patrick Doyle	Nominated	
2023	Irish Film and Television Awards	Best Editing	Úna Ní Dhonghaíle	Nominated	
2023	Ivor Novello Award	Best Original Film Score	Patrick Doyle	Nominated	

== Sequel ==
In a December 2017 interview with the Associated Press, Branagh discussed developing the adaptation of Death on the Nile with the possibility of more films to follow, potentially creating a new "cinematic universe" of Christie films:

"I think there are possibilities, aren't there? With 66 books and short stories and plays, she — and she often brings people together in her own books actually, so innately — she enjoyed that," he says. "You feel as though there is a world — just like with Dickens, there's a complete world that she's created — certain kinds of characters who live in her world — that I think has real possibilities."

Branagh stated that discussions for additional films were ongoing in February 2022, hoping the film series becomes a franchise including other Christie characters, including Jane Marple. By March 2022, 20th Century Studios President Steve Asbell confirmed a third installment was in development. Branagh returned as director and star, while Michael Green once again served as screenwriter. Production for A Haunting in Venice began November 2022, and the film was released September 15, 2023.
