= Haris Zambarloukos =

Greek Cypriot cinematographer

- Χάρης Ζαμπαρλούκος
- Born: 11 March 1970 (age 56); Nicosia, Cyprus
- Years active: 1993–present
- Website: zambarloukos.com

Haris Zambarloukos, B.S.C. (Greek: Χάρης Ζαμπαρλούκος; born 11 March 1970) is a Greek-Cypriot cinematographer, known mostly for his work in British productions, particularly with director Kenneth Branagh.

== Early life and education ==
Born in Nicosia, Zambarloukos obtained his BFA from the Central Saint Martins College of Art and Design in London, and his MFA in cinematography from the AFI Conservatory in 1997.

== Career ==
Zambarloukos worked as a camera intern under Conrad Hall in A Civil Action (1998).

In 2006, he was named one of Variety's "10 Cinematographers to Watch".

Zambarloukos is on the Board of Governors of the British Society of Cinematographers.

== Filmography ==
=== Feature film ===
Key
†	Denotes films that have not yet been released

Year	Title	Director	Notes
2000	Camera Obscura	Hamlet Sarkissian	
2001	Mr In-Between	Paul Sarossy	
2004	Enduring Love	Roger Michell	
2004	Spivs	Colin Teague	
2005	Opa!	Udayan Prasad	
2005	The Best Man	Stefan Schwartz	
2006	Venus	Roger Michell	
2007	Sleuth	Kenneth Branagh	1st collaboration with Branagh
2007	Death Defying Acts	Gillian Armstrong	
2008	Mamma Mia!	Phyllida Lloyd	
2008	The Other Man	Richard Eyre	
2011	Thor	Kenneth Branagh	
2013	Locke	Steven Knight	
2014	Jack Ryan: Shadow Recruit	Kenneth Branagh	
2015	Cinderella	Kenneth Branagh	
2015	Eye in the Sky	Gavin Hood	
2016	Denial	Mick Jackson	
2017	Murder on the Orient Express	Kenneth Branagh	
2020	Artemis Fowl	Kenneth Branagh	
2021	Belfast	Kenneth Branagh	
2022	Death on the Nile	Kenneth Branagh	
2023	Meg 2: The Trench	Ben Wheatley	
2023	A Haunting in Venice	Kenneth Branagh	
2024	Beetlejuice Beetlejuice	Tim Burton	
2026	Ladies First	Thea Sharrock	
2026	Oasis: Don't Look Back in Anger †	Will Lovelace; Dylan Southern	Documentary

== Awards and nominations ==
Year	Award	Category	Title	Result
2021	American Society of Cinematographers	Outstanding Achievement in Cinematography	Belfast	Nominated
2021	British Independent Film Awards	Best Cinematography	Belfast	Nominated
2021	Critics' Choice Movie Awards	Best Cinematography	Belfast	Nominated
2021	Satellite Awards	Best Cinematography	Belfast	Nominated
2021	St. Louis Film Critics Association	Best Cinematography	Belfast	Nominated
2021	Washington D.C. Area Film Critics Association	Best Cinematography	Belfast	Nominated
