= Judy Hofflund =

American film producer

Judy Hofflund is a US film producer. She worked at Creative Artists Agency and became assistant to CAA President Ron Meyer.

In 2013 she said she was quitting the representation business after three decades.

In 2018 she took part in the campaign "Shoot'em with a Camera, Not a Gun" to save grizzly bears from being hunted in Wyoming.

== Filmography ==
She was a producer in all films unless otherwise noted.

=== Film ===
Year	Film	Credit
1999	8mm	
1999	Drop Dead Gorgeous	
1999	Stir of Echoes	
2002	Panic Room	
2006	As You Like It	
2017	Murder on the Orient Express	
2018	All Is True	Executive producer
2020	Artemis Fowl	
2022	Death on the Nile	
2023	A Haunting in Venice	

Thanks

Year	Film	Role
1997	The Matchmaker	Thanks

=== Television ===
Year	Title	Credit	Notes
1998	When Trumpets Fade	Executive producer	Television film
