= Mark Gordon (producer) =

American television director and producer (born 1956)

- Born: Mark Richard Gordon; October 10, 1956 (age 69); Newport News, Virginia, U.S.
- Education: New York University Film School
- Occupations: Film producer, television producer
- Years active: 1981–present
- Spouses: Karen Villeneuve (m. 1997–2003); Sally Whitehill (m. 2011)

Mark Richard Gordon (born October 10, 1956) is an American producer. He is a former president of the Producers Guild of America. In January 2018, Gordon was named president and chief content officer of film and television for Entertainment One, which had acquired his production company, The Mark Gordon Company.

== Early life and education ==
Gordon was born on October 10, 1956, in Newport News, Virginia. He is of Jewish descent. He is a graduate of New York University Film School.

== Career ==
Gordon's first producing effort was the Off-Broadway production of The Buddy System at Circle in the Square downtown.

In the television arena, Gordon is an executive producer on The Rookie and Grey's Anatomy while his past projects include Ray Donovan, Criminal Minds, Designated Survivor, Private Practice, and Army Wives. Gordon's work in television has garnered him a Golden Globe in addition to five Emmy nominations and two wins. In 2015 he was awarded the Norman Lear Award for Lifetime Achievement in Television by the Producers Guild of America.

Gordon's films include Saving Private Ryan, Steve Jobs, Murder on the Orient Express, Death on the Nile, Molly's Game, 2012, The Day After Tomorrow, Speed, Source Code, The Messenger, and The Patriot. Gordon has also taken on the role of executive producer and financier for films such as Lara Croft: Tomb Raider, Hellboy, Wonder Boys, The Painted Veil, A Simple Plan, Primary Colors, and Official Secrets. As a film producer, Gordon is an Academy Award Nominee, a Golden Globe winner, a two-time nominee, and one time BAFTA winner as well as a seven-time nominee and three-time PGA award winner.

Gordon is the President Emeritus of the Producers Guild of America, having been its President from 2010 through 2014.

=== The Mark Gordon Company ===
In 2015, The Mark Gordon Company partnered with Entertainment One to create an independent television and film studio as eOne acquired 51% of the production company for $133 million.

Gordon was CEO of the company, which financed and produced content by Gordon and other producers. In 2018, eOne paid Gordon an additional $240 million to fully own the Mark Gordon Company. Gordon was offered the job of president and chief content officer of film, television and digital at eOne. In July 2019, Gordon left his job as eOne president and chief content officer of film and television by shifting to a producer deal with eOne.

=== Mark Gordon Pictures ===
In 2020, Gordon launched a new production company called Mark Gordon Pictures.
