= Úna Ní Dhonghaíle =

Irish film editor

- Occupations: Film editor, film director
- Years active: 1997–present
- Notable work: The Crown; Stan & Ollie; All Is True; Belfast

Úna Ní Dhonghaíle (pronounced [ˈuːnˠə n̠ʲiː ˈɣɔnˠiːlʲə]) is an Irish film editor and film director.

== Career ==
She won a BAFTA award in 2017 for her work on Netflix's The Crown. She won BAFTA, IFTA and WIFTA awards in 2018 for her work on the Three Girls miniseries.

She was the editor of Kenneth Branagh's 2018 film, All Is True. She was also editor for Branagh's 2021 film Belfast and his 2022 film Death on the Nile. For her work on Belfast, she was nominated for the BAFTA Award for Best Editing.

In recognition of her contribution to the editing craft and her mentoring of up and coming talent, Una received the "Outstanding Contribution Award" at the British Film Editors' Cut Above Awards 2025 on 13 February. The award was announced by BFE governor Col Goudie and presented to Una by director Kenneth Branagh, for whom she edited All is True, Belfast and Death on the Nile.

=== Film ===
Year	Title	Director
2009	Veronika Decides to Die	Emily Young
2018	Rosie	Paddy Breathnach
2018	Stan & Ollie	Jon S. Baird
2018	All is True	Kenneth Branagh
2020	Misbehaviour	Philippa Lowthorpe
2021	Belfast	Kenneth Branagh
2022	Death on the Nile	Kenneth Branagh
2024	Young Woman and the Sea	Joachim Rønning
2024	Paddington in Peru	Dougal Wilson
Cancelled	The Mothership	Matthew Charman
