= Tom Bateman (actor) =

British actor (born 1989)

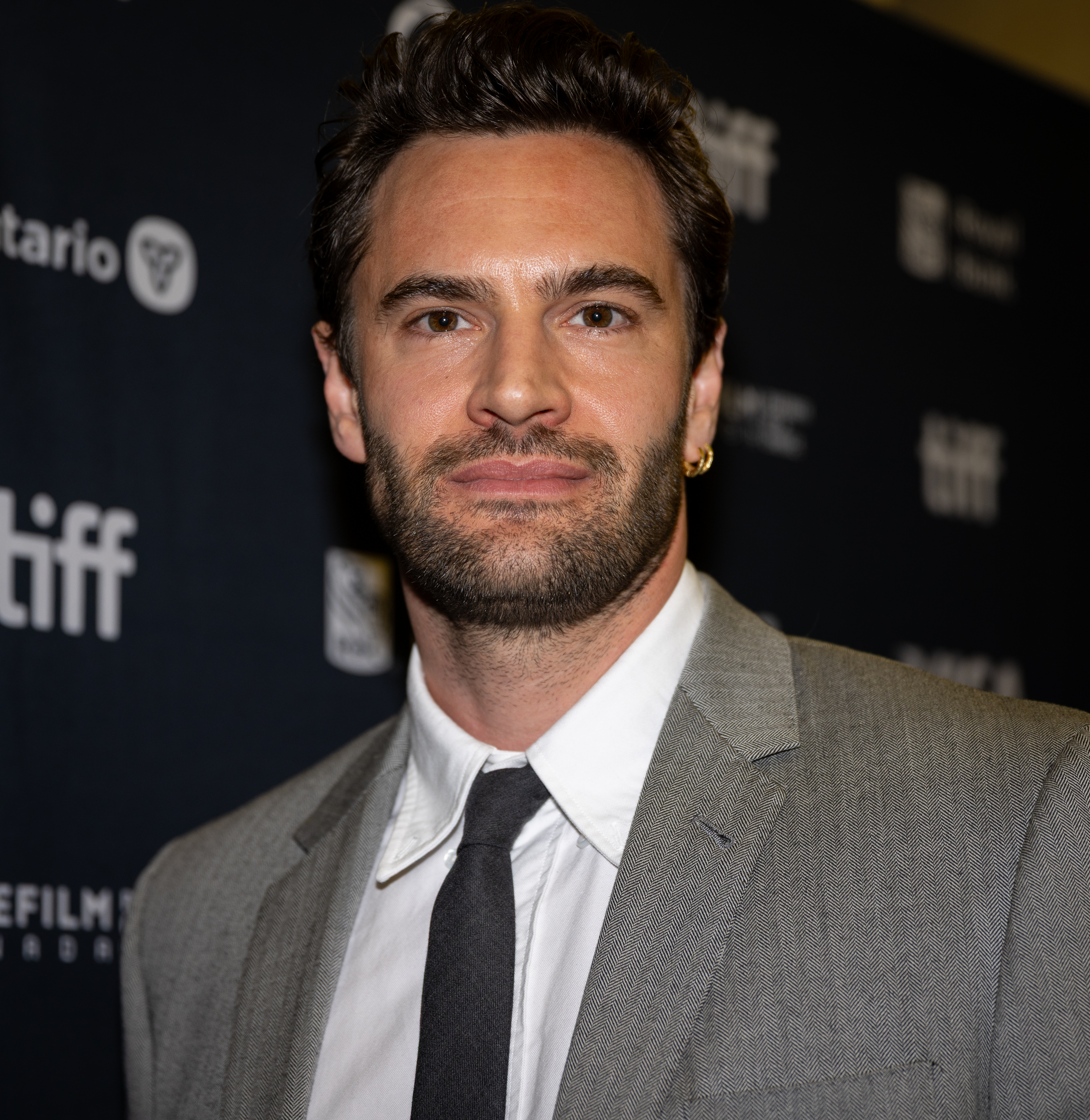
- Bateman at the 2025 Toronto International Film Festival
- Born: 15 March 1989 (age 37); Oxford, Oxfordshire, England
- Education: London Academy of Music and Dramatic Art
- Occupation: Actor
- Years active: 2011–present
- Spouse: Daisy Ridley

Thomas Jonathan Bateman (born 15 March 1989) is a British actor best known for his roles as Giuliano de' Medici in the Starz historical fantasy drama series Da Vinci's Demons (2013–2015), as Bouc in the mystery films Murder on the Orient Express (2017) and Death on the Nile (2022), and as Matt Pierce in the Peacock comedy thriller Based on a True Story (2023–2024).

== Early life ==
Thomas Jonathan Bateman was born in Oxford, Oxfordshire, to a music teacher father and primary-school teacher mother. He has 13 siblings, including a twin brother named Merlin.

Bateman studied drama at the London Academy of Music and Dramatic Art (LAMDA), where he appeared in a production of Much Ado About Nothing with Catherine Tate and David Tennant. He later joined Kenneth Branagh's company at the Garrick Theatre, where he acted alongside Judi Dench in The Winter's Tale.

== Personal life ==
In 2017, Bateman started a relationship with actress Daisy Ridley after meeting on the set of Murder on the Orient Express. During Ridley's promotion of Sometimes I Think About Dying at the Sundance Film Festival in January 2023, she confirmed that she and Bateman had married.

== Filmography ==
=== Film ===
Year	Title	Role	Notes	Ref.
2011	Much Ado About Nothing	Claudio		
2015	Creditors	Michael Redmane		
2015	Branagh Theatre Live: The Winter's Tale	Florizel		
2017	B&B	Marc		
2017	Snatched	James		
2017	Murder on the Orient Express	Bouc		
2017	Hi-Lo Joe	Tony		
2019	Cold Pursuit	Trevor "Viking" Calcote		
2022	Death on the Nile	Bouc		
2022	Thirteen Lives	Chris Jewell		
2024	Magpie	—N/a	Writer and producer	
2025	Hedda	George Tesman		
2026	The Love Hypothesis	Dr. Adam Carlsen		
TBA	The Last Disturbance of Madeline Hynde	TBA	Post-production	

=== Television ===
Year	Title	Role	Notes	Ref.
2013	The Tunnel	Danny Hillier	Recurring role; 7 episodes (series 1)	
2013–2014	Da Vinci's Demons	Giuliano de' Medici	Recurring role; 10 episodes (seasons 1–2)	
2015	Jekyll and Hyde	Dr. Robert Jekyll / Mr Robert Hyde	Lead role; 10 episodes	
2016	Cold Feet	Justin Parker	Episodes: "Episode #6.6" & "Episode #6.8"	
2018	Vanity Fair	Rawdon Crawley	Miniseries; 6 episodes	
2018	Into the Dark	Wilkes	Episode: "The Body"	
2019	Beecham House	John Beecham	Main role; 6 episodes	
2021	Behind Her Eyes	David Ferguson	Miniseries; 6 episodes	
2023	Funny Woman	Clive Richardson	Main role; 6 episodes (series 1)	
2023–2024	Based on a True Story	Matt Pierce	Main role; 16 episodes	

=== Audio ===
Year	Title	Role	Notes
2026	Olympus U	Hayden	Main role
