= The Mark Gordon Company =

American production company

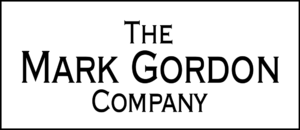
- Formerly: The Meledandri/Gordon Company (1987–1991)
- Type: Production company
- Industry: Film; Television
- Founded: 1987; 39 years ago
- Founder: Mark Gordon; Chris Meledandri
- Defunct: 2018; 8 years ago (as a standalone company)
- Fate: Acquired by Entertainment One; Brand retained in the United States only
- Headquarters: Los Angeles, California
- Key people: Mark Gordon
- Products: Motion pictures Television
- Parent: Entertainment One (2015–2018)

The Mark Gordon Company (formerly The Meledandri/Gordon Company) was an American production company owned by Mark Gordon. It is notable for their output, including feature films, like Speed, many of Roland Emmerich's films Gordon produced like The Day After Tomorrow, 10,000 B.C. and 2012, and TV shows like Grey's Anatomy, Criminal Minds, The Rookie and Ray Donovan.

== History ==
=== Original era (1987–1995) ===
In 1987, film producers Mark Gordon and Chris Meledandri, the latter of whom would later go on to found Illumination Entertainment, formed The Meledandri/Gordon Company, with a non-exclusive deal with Paramount Pictures. Meledandri quit in 1991 to join Dawn Steel's production company, and it was renamed to The Mark Gordon Company.

Its big break came in 1994 when Gordon made its first success with its film Speed, which grossed $350.4 million at the box office.

Their second big success from Gordon was the 1996 film Broken Arrow, which grossed $150.2 million at the box office.

On December 10, 1995, Gordon merged its own company with Gary Levinson's Classico Entertainment, which ultimately signed a deal with Paramount Pictures after its deal with Fox ends. It was at first known as Cloud Nine Entertainment, before settling on Mutual Film Company.

=== Second era (2000–2015) ===
On September 7, 2000, it was announced that Mark Gordon was quitting Mutual Film Company in order to relaunch his own company. A year later, on October 10, 2001, it signed a deal with 20th Century Fox to produce new films under its own production company and hired Betsy Beers to run the company.

In 2002, Gordon partnered with Bob Yari to launch Stratus Film Company, to produce independent feature films, and hired Mark Gill as executive of the studio. Gordon exited the organization in 2005.

In 2003, Gordon signed a deal with Columbia Pictures to produce its feature films for a three-year pact.

In 2004, Mark Gordon was producing its first TV series LAX for NBC, which came from the studio. On August 18, 2004, Gordon signed a deal with Touchstone Television for two years, where the studio is developing drama projects.

That same year, The Day After Tomorrow became the studio's first hit under the new era, and it grossed $552.6 million worldwide.

In 2005, Gordon made his first big success on TV with the Shonda Rhimes-created series Grey's Anatomy. The studio followed up his success with Criminal Minds, which aired on CBS.

In 2007, its own pact with ABC Studios was renewed. Four years later, in 2011, it signed a production deal with The Walt Disney Studios, whereas Gordon is running the company for four years until 2015.

=== Entertainment One era (2015–2018) ===
In 2015, Entertainment One acquired its 51% stake in The Mark Gordon Company. eOne will handle international sales of its productions developed by The Mark Gordon Company. In 2016, Gordon launched its first two independent shows under eOne's regime, including Designated Survivor and Conviction, all of them were co-produced with ABC Studios and aired on the ABC network.

In 2018, Entertainment One acquired the remaining 49% of the company and it folded The Mark Gordon Company into the parent company, by making Gordon president of it.

=== Third era (2019–present) ===
On July 25, 2019, Mark Gordon announced that he will step down as Entertainment One president, in order to relaunch his own independent studio, with its own first-look deal with the studio eOne.

== Productions ==
=== Theatrical/direct-to-video films ===
As The Meledandri/Gordon Company
Year	Title	Director	Distributor	Notes	Budget	Gross (worldwide)
1988	Brothers in Arms	George Bloom	Vision p.d.g. International	first film as The Meledandri/Gordon Company; co-production with Ablo and Jel	N/A	
1990	Opportunity Knocks	Donald Petrie	Universal Pictures	as The Meledandri/Gordon Company; co-production with Imagine Entertainment and Brad Grey Productions	$13 million	$11.3 million
1992	Traces of Red	Andy Wolk	The Samuel Goldwyn Company	uncredited	N/A	$3.2 million
1992	Fly by Night	Steve Gomer	Arrow Releasing	last film as The Meledandri/Gordon Company; co-production with Lumiere Productions	N/A	
As The Mark Gordon Company
1993	Swing Kids	Thomas Carter	Buena Vista Pictures	co-production with Touchwood Pacific Partners I, Hollywood Pictures and John Bard Manulis Productions	$12 million	$5.6 million
1994	Speed	Jan de Bont	20th Century Fox		$30 million	$350.4 million
1994	Trial by Jury	Heywood Gould	Warner Bros.	uncredited; co-production with Morgan Creek Productions	N/A	$6.97 million
1995	A Pyromaniac's Love Story	Joshua Brand	Buena Vista Pictures	co-production with Hollywood Pictures	N/A	$468,240
1996	Broken Arrow	John Woo	20th Century Fox	last film under original regime before folding into Mutual Film Company	$50 million	$150.2 million
2003	The League of Extraordinary Gentlemen	Stephen Norrington	20th Century Fox	first film under new regime since he left Mutual Film Company uncredited; co-production with Angry Films and Fountainbridge Films	$78 million	$179.3 million
2004	The Day After Tomorrow	Roland Emmerich	20th Century Fox	co-production with Lions Gate Films and Centropolis Entertainment	$125 million	$552.6 million
2005	Casanova	Lasse Hallström	Buena Vista Pictures	co-production with Touchstone Pictures and Hallström/Holleran Productions	N/A	$37.6 million
2005	Life of the Party	Barra Grant	THINKfilm	co-production with Brian Reilly Productions	N/A	
2006	The Hoax	Lasse Hallström	Miramax Films	co-production with Bob Yari Productions, Hallström/Holleran Productions and City Entertainment	$25 million	$11.7 million
2006	The Painted Veil	John Curran	Warner Independent Pictures	co-production with Bob Yari Productions, Colleton Company, Emotion Pictures, Class 5 Films and Warner China Film HG Corporation	$19.4 million	$26.8 million
2007	Talk to Me	Kasi Lemmons	Focus Features	co-production with Sidney Kimmel Entertainment and Pelagius Films	N/A	$4.77 million
2008	10,000 B.C.	Roland Emmerich	Warner Bros. Pictures	uncredited; co-production with Legendary Pictures and Centropolis Entertainment	$105 million	$269.8 million
2008	Heart of a Dragon	Michael French	China Film Group Corporation	co-production with Thunder Bay Films	$10 million	N/A
2009	The Messenger	Oren Moverman	Oscilloscope Laboratories	co-production with Omnilab Media, Sherazade Film Development, BZ Entertainment and Good Worldwide	$6.5 million	$1.5 million
2009	12 Rounds	Renny Harlin	20th Century Fox	co-production with Fox Atomic and WWE Studios	N/A	$17.28 million
2009	2012	Roland Emmerich	Sony Pictures Releasing	uncredited; co-production with Columbia Pictures and Centropolis Entertainment	$200 million	$769.7 million
2011	The Details	Jacob Aaron Estes	The Weinstein Company	co-production with LD Entertainment	N/A	$63,595
2011	Source Code	Duncan Jones	Summit Entertainment	co-production with Vendôme Pictures and StudioCanal	$31.9 million	$147.3 million
2011	Rampart	Oren Moverman	Millennium Entertainment	uncredited; co-production with Waypoint Entertainment, Amalgam Pictures, The Third Mind Pictures and Lightstream Entertainment	$12 million	$1.56 million
2013	The To Do List	Maggie Carey	CBS Films	co-production with Varsity Pictures	$1.5 million	$3.9 million
2015	Steve Jobs	Danny Boyle	Universal Pictures	co-production with Legendary Pictures, Scott Rudin Productions, Entertainment 360, Decibel Films, Cloud Eight Films and Digital Image Associates	$30 million	$34.4 million
2016	War Dogs	Todd Phillips	Warner Bros. Pictures	co-production with RatPac-Dune Entertainment and Joint Effort Productions	$50 million	$86.2 million
2017	Molly's Game	Aaron Sorkin	STX Films	co-production with STX Films, Huayi Brothers, Tang Media Productions and Pascal Pictures	$30 million	$59.3 million
2017	Sand Castle	Fernando Coimbra	Netflix	co-production with Treehouse Pictures and International Traders	N/A	
2017	Murder on the Orient Express	Kenneth Branagh	20th Century Fox	co-production with Kinberg Genre and Scott Free Productions	$55 million	$352.8 million
2018	The Nutcracker and the Four Realms	Lasse Hallström; Joe Johnston	Walt Disney Studios Motion Pictures	co-production with Walt Disney Pictures	$120–133 million	$174 million
As Mark Gordon Pictures
2022	Death on the Nile	Kenneth Branagh	20th Century Studios	co-production with Kinberg Genre and Scott Free Productions	$90 million	$137.3 million
2023	A Haunting in Venice	Kenneth Branagh	20th Century Studios	co-production with Kinberg Genre and Scott Free Productions	$60 million	$74 million

=== Television shows ===
Years	Title	Creator	Network	Notes	Seasons	Episodes
2004–2005	LAX	Nick Thiel	NBC	co-production with Nick Thiel Productions and NBC Universal Television Studio	1	13
2005–present	Grey's Anatomy	Shonda Rhimes	ABC	co-production with Shondaland (season 2–), Touchstone Television (seasons 1–3) and ABC Signature (season 4–20)	21	441
2005–present	Criminal Minds	Jeff Davis	CBS/Paramount+ & Disney+	co-production with Paramount Network Television (season 1), CBS Paramount Network Television (season 2–4), CBS Television Studios (seasons 5–15), Touchstone Television (seasons 1–2) and ABC Signature (seasons 3–15)	17	344
2007–2013	Army Wives	Katherine Fugate based on the book "Under the Sabers: The Unwritten Code of Army Wives" by: Tanya Biank	Lifetime	co-production with ABC Studios	7	117
2007–2013	Private Practice	Shonda Rhimes	ABC	co-production with Shondaland and ABC Studios	6	111
2007–2009	Reaper	Michelle Fazekas; Tara Butters	The CW	co-production with Fazekas & Butters and ABC Studios	2	31
2011	Criminal Minds: Suspect Behavior	Edward Allen Bernero; Chris Mundy	CBS	co-production with Bernero Productions, CBS Television Studios and ABC Studios	1	13
2013	Family Tools	Bobby Bowman	ABC	co-production with ITV Studios America and ABC Studios	1	10
2013–2020	Ray Donovan	Ann Biderman	Showtime	co-production with Ann Biderman Co. (season 1), Bider Sweet Productions (season 2), David Hollander Productions (seasons 3–7) and Showtime Networks	7	82
2014	Benched	Michaela Watkins; Damon Jones	USA Network	co-production with ABC Signature	1	12
2015–2018	Quantico	Joshua Safran	ABC	co-production with ABC Studios, Random Acts Productions (seasons 1–2) and Maniac Productions (season 3)	3	57
2016–2017	Criminal Minds: Beyond Borders	Erica Messer	CBS	co-production with Erica Messer Productions, CBS Television Studios and ABC Studios	2	26
2016–2017	Conviction	Liz Friedlander; Liz Friedman	ABC	co-production with Entertainment One, Double Fried and ABC Studios	1	13
2016–2019	Designated Survivor	David Guggenheim	ABC/Netflix	co-production with Entertainment One, Kinberg Genre, ABC Studios (seasons 1–2) and Baer Bones (season 3)	3	53
2018	Youth & Consequences	Jason Ubaldi	YouTube Premium	co-production with Entertainment One	1	8
2018–present	The Rookie	Alexi Hawley	ABC	co-production with Entertainment One, Perfectman Pictures and ABC Signature (seasons 1-6)	7	119

=== Television movies/pilots/specials ===
Year	Title	Director	Network	Notes
1991	Lightning Field	Michael Switzer	USA Network	as The Meledandri/Gordon Company; co-production with Wilshire Court Productions
1991	Love Kills	Brian Grant	USA Network	as The Meledandri/Gordon Company; co-production with Wilshire Court Productions and O.T.M.L. Productions, Inc.
1995	The Man Who Wouldn't Die	Bill Condon	ABC	uncredited; co-production with Alan Barnette Productions and Universal Television
1995	Children Remember the Holocaust	Mark Gordon	CBS	uncredited
2003	And Starring Pancho Villa as Himself	Bruce Beresford	HBO	co-production with HBO Films
2003	Footsteps	John Badham	CBS	co-production with Ken Raskoff Productions and Fox Television Studios
2005	Warm Springs	Joseph Sargent	HBO	co-production with HBO Films
2006	A House Divided	Michael Rymer	ABC	co-production with Touchstone Television
2009	House Rules	Daniel Minahan	CBS	co-production with CBS Television Studios and ABC Studios
2009	Empire State	Jeremy Podeswa	ABC	co-production with ABC Studios
2010	It Takes a Village	Michael Fresco	ABC	co-production with ABC Studios
2011	Identity	Gary Fleder	ABC	co-production with ITV Studios America and ABC Studios
2012	Dark Horse	Roland Emmerich	ABC	co-production with ABC Studios
2012	Americana	Phillip Noyce	ABC	co-production with ABC Studios
2013	Gothica	Anand Tucker	ABC	co-production with ABC Studios
2014	Clementine	Michael Dinner	ABC	co-production with ABC Studios
2015	Agatha	Jace Alexander	ABC	co-production with Stearns Castle Entertainment and ABC Studios
2017	The Climb	Chris Robinson	Amazon Prime Video	co-production with Entertainment One and Amazon Studios
2017	Las Reinas	Liz Friedlander	ABC	co-production with Entertainment One and ABC Studios
