= Jude Hill =

Northern Irish child actor (born 2010)

- Born: 1 August 2010 (age 16); Gilford, County Down, Northern Ireland
- Occupation: Actor
- Years active: 2020–present

Jude Hill (born 1 August 2010) is a child actor from Northern Ireland. He is known for his lead role in Kenneth Branagh's film Belfast (2021) based on Branagh's childhood, for which Hill won the Critics' Choice Award for Best Young Performer. He has since starred in Branagh's A Haunting in Venice (2023).

== Early life ==
Hill was born on 1 August 2010, in Gilford, a village in County Down near Armagh in Northern Ireland to parents Shauneen and Darryl. He has a younger sister and a younger brother. He attended St John's Primary School and took drama classes at the Shelley Lowry School in Portadown from the age of four.

== Career ==
Hill made his feature film debut in Kenneth Branagh's Belfast. The film's story is mostly told through the eyes of Hill's character Buddy, "a smart, cheery 9-year-old and a fictional version of Branagh himself", as described by Jeanette Catsoulis of The New York Times. Hill was nine when he was cast as the film's lead out of 300 young actors who auditioned, ten when filming took place, and eleven when the film premiered in 2021.

Hill also played the title role in the World War II-set short film Rian, which premiered at the 2021 CineMagic. In December 2021, Hill signed with United Talent Agency stateside.

In 2022, Hill attended Italy's David di Donatello ceremony as a special guest, picking up the Best Foreign Film award won by Belfast. In the same year, he made his television debut in Magpie Murders, a BritBox and PBS Masterpiece adaptation of the 2016 mystery novel of the same by Anthony Horowitz. He also appeared alongside Deirdre Mullins in the horror film Mandrake.

In September 2023, he appeared as Leopold Ferrier in Branagh's supernatural mystery film A Haunting in Venice, based on Agatha Christie's Hallowe'en Party.

Hill portrayed Harry Vandergroot in the Amazon film Holland alongside actress Nicole Kidman, which was released on 27 March 2025.

== Filmography ==
Key
| † | Denotes films that have not yet been released |

| Year | Title | Role | Notes |
|---|---|---|---|
| 2021 | Rian | Rian McMurphy | Short film |
| 2021 | Belfast | Buddy | |
| 2022 | Magpie Murders | Sam Blakiston | 4 episodes |
| 2022 | Mandrake | Luke | |
| 2023 | Dungeons & Dragons: Honor Among Thieves | Young Boy in Stands | |
| 2023 | A Haunting in Venice | Leopold Ferrier | |
| 2025 | Holland | Harry Vandergroot | |
| 2026 | Way of the Warrior Kid † | Marc | Post-production |

== Awards and nominations ==
| Year | Award | Category | Work | Result | Ref |
|---|---|---|---|---|---|
| 2021 | British Independent Film Awards | Breakthrough Performance | Belfast | Nominated | |
| 2021 | Florida Film Critics Circle | Breakout Award | Belfast | Nominated | |
| 2021 | Indiana Film Journalists Association | Breakout of the Year | Belfast | Nominated | |
| 2021 | Las Vegas Film Critics Society | Youth in Film – Male | Belfast | Won | |
| 2021 | North Texas Film Critics Association | Best Newcomer | Belfast | Nominated | |
| 2021 | Phoenix Film Critics Society | Best Performance by a Youth | Belfast | Won | |
| 2021 | Washington D.C. Area Film Critics Association | Best Youth Performance | Belfast | Nominated | |
| 2022 | Columbus Film Critics Association | Breakthrough Film Artist | Belfast | Runner-up | |
| 2022 | Critics' Choice Movie Awards | Best Young Actor/Actress | Belfast | Won | |
| 2022 | DiscussingFilm Critics Awards | Best Debut Performance | Belfast | Nominated | |
| 2022 | Georgia Film Critics Association | Breakthrough Award | Belfast | Nominated | |
| 2022 | Hollywood Critics Association | Newcomer Award | Belfast | Won | |
| 2022 | International Film Society Critics | Best Youth Performance | Belfast | Nominated | |
| 2022 | Irish Film & Television Awards | Lead Actor in a Film | Belfast | Nominated | |
| 2022 | London Film Critics Circle | Young British/Irish Performer | Belfast | Nominated | |
| 2022 | Music City Film Critics Association | Best Young Actor | Belfast | Won | |
| 2022 | Online Film & Television Association | Best Youth Performance | Belfast | Nominated | |
| 2022 | San Diego Film Critics Society | Best Actor | Belfast | Nominated | |
| 2022 | San Diego Film Critics Society | Best Youth Performance | Belfast | Won | |
| 2022 | San Diego Film Critics Society | Breakthrough Artist | Belfast | Runner-up | |
| 2022 | Seattle Film Critics Society | Best Youth Performance | Belfast | Nominated | |
