= List of accolades received by Belfast (film) =

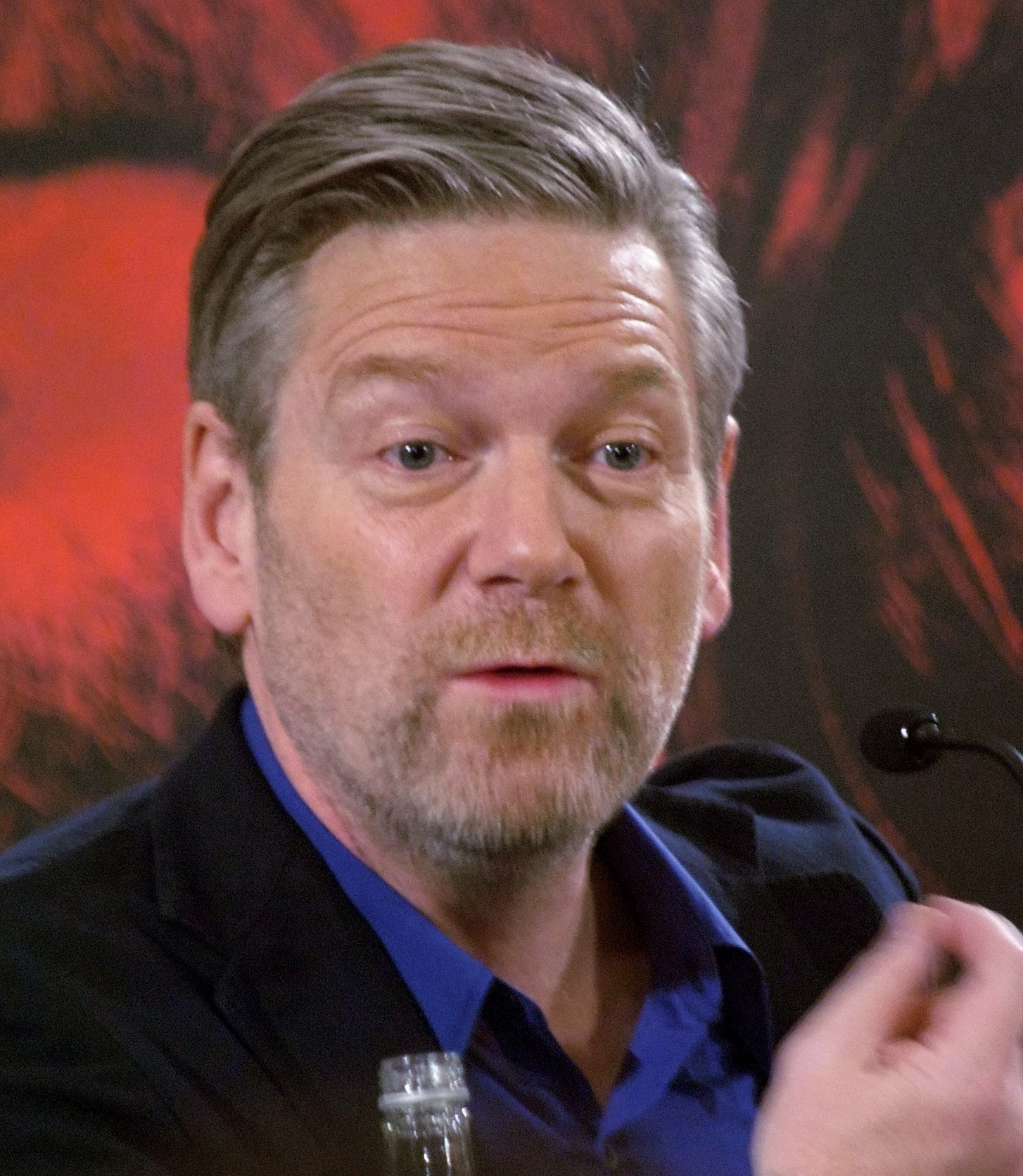
- Kenneth Branagh received many awards and nominations for writing and directing Belfast.
Accolades
Award	Wins	Nominations
AACTA International Awards	1	7
AARP Movies for Grownups Awards	1	8
Academy Awards	1	7
Alliance of Women Film Journalists	2	9
American Film Institute Awards	1	1
American Society of Cinematographers Awards	0	1
British Academy Film Awards	1	6
British Independent Film Awards	0	11
Critics' Choice Awards	3	11
Detroit Film Critics Society	0	2
Directors Guild of America Awards	0	1
European Film Awards	2	3
Florida Film Critics Circle	0	4
Golden Globe Awards	1	7
Hamilton Behind the Camera Awards	1	1
Heartland Film Festival	1	1
Hollywood Critics Association	1	10
Hollywood Music in Media Awards	0	1
Houston Film Critics Society	0	5
Mill Valley Film Festival	1	1
Montclair Film Festival	1	1
National Board of Review	2	2
Newport Beach Film Festival	1	1
Palm Springs International Film Festival	1	1
San Diego Film Critics Society	9	12
San Diego International Film Festival	1	1
Satellite Awards	0	13
Screen Actors Guild Awards	0	2
St. Louis Film Critics Association	4	8
Stockholm International Film Festival	1	1
Toronto International Film Festival	1	1
Washington D.C. Area Film Critics Association	2	11

Totals (Note: Certain award groups do not simply award one winner. They acknowledge several different recipients, have runners-up, and have third place. Since this is a specific recognition and is different from losing an award, runner-up mentions are considered wins in this award tally. For simplification and to avoid errors, each award in this list has been presumed to have had a prior nomination.)
- Wins: 41
- Nominations: 154

Belfast is a 2021 British and Irish coming-of-age comedy-drama film written and directed by Kenneth Branagh. The film stars Caitríona Balfe, Judi Dench, Jamie Dornan, Ciarán Hinds, Colin Morgan, and newcomer Jude Hill. The film, which Branagh has described as his "most personal film", centers on a young boy's childhood amidst the tumult of Belfast, Northern Ireland, in the 1960s.

Belfast had its world premiere at the 48th Telluride Film Festival on 2 September 2021, and also won the People's Choice Award at the 2021 Toronto International Film Festival. The film was released in the United States on 12 November 2021 by Focus Features, and in the United Kingdom and Ireland on 21 January 2022, by Universal Pictures. It received positive reviews from critics and has, so far, grossed over $15.7 million, worldwide.

It received seven nominations at the 94th Academy Awards, including Best Picture, and was named one of the best films of 2021 by the National Board of Review. It tied with The Power of the Dog for a leading seven nominations at the 79th Golden Globe Awards, including Best Motion Picture – Drama; the film won a Golden Globe for Best Screenplay. It also tied with Steven Spielberg's West Side Story for a leading eleven nominations at the 27th Critics' Choice Awards, winning Best Ensemble Cast and Best Original Screenplay. The movie received six nominations at the 75th British Academy Film Awards, winning Outstanding British Film. Branagh became the first individual to have been nominated in a total of seven different categories with his nominations in the Best Picture and Best Original Screenplay categories for his work on the film. At the age of 87, Judi Dench became the second oldest nominee in the category of Best Supporting Actress for her performance, after Gloria Stuart was nominated in the same category for her role in Titanic (1997), also at 87 years old but a few months older than Dench.

== Accolades ==
Award	Date of ceremony	Category	Recipient(s)	Result	Ref.
Toronto International Film Festival	18 September 2021	People's Choice Award	Belfast	Won	
Heartland Film Festival	29 September 2021	Truly Moving Picture Award	Belfast	Won	
Mill Valley Film Festival	19 October 2021	Overall Audience Favorite	Belfast	Won	
San Diego International Film Festival	27 October 2021	Audience Choice Gala	Belfast	Won	
Newport Beach Film Festival	29 October 2021	Best Narrative Feature	Belfast	Won	
Montclair Film Festival	1 November 2021	Fiction Feature	Belfast	Won	
Hamilton Behind the Camera Awards	13 November 2021	Best Cinematography	Haris Zambarloukos	Won	
Hollywood Music in Media Awards	17 November 2021	Best Original Song in an Independent Film	"Down to Joy" written and performed by Van Morrison	Nominated	
Camerimage	20 November 2021	Golden Frog for Best Cinematography	Haris Zambarloukos	Nominated	
Stockholm International Film Festival	22 November 2021	Audience Award	Belfast	Won	
National Board of Review	2 December 2021	Top Films (shared)	Belfast	Won	
National Board of Review	2 December 2021	Best Supporting Actor	Ciarán Hinds	Won	
British Independent Film Awards	5 December 2021	Best Actress	Caitríona Balfe	Nominated	
British Independent Film Awards	5 December 2021	Best Supporting Actor	Ciarán Hinds	Nominated	
British Independent Film Awards	5 December 2021	Best Supporting Actress	Judi Dench	Nominated	
British Independent Film Awards	5 December 2021	Breakthrough Performance	Jude Hill	Nominated	
British Independent Film Awards	5 December 2021	Best Casting	Lucy Bevan, Emily Brockmann	Nominated	
British Independent Film Awards	5 December 2021	Best Cinematography	Haris Zambarloukos	Nominated	
British Independent Film Awards	5 December 2021	Best Costume Design	Charlotte Walter	Nominated	
British Independent Film Awards	5 December 2021	Best Editing	Úna Ní Dhonghaíle	Nominated	
British Independent Film Awards	5 December 2021	Best Make-Up & Hair Design	Wakana Yoshihara	Nominated	
British Independent Film Awards	5 December 2021	Best Music	Van Morrison	Nominated	
British Independent Film Awards	5 December 2021	Best Production Design	Jim Clay	Nominated	
Detroit Film Critics Society	6 December 2021	Best Picture	Belfast	Nominated	
Detroit Film Critics Society	6 December 2021	Best Director	Kenneth Branagh	Nominated	
Washington D.C. Area Film Critics Association	6 December 2021	Best Film	Belfast	Won	
Washington D.C. Area Film Critics Association	6 December 2021	Best Director	Kenneth Branagh	Nominated	
Washington D.C. Area Film Critics Association	6 December 2021	Best Supporting Actor	Jamie Dornan	Nominated	
Washington D.C. Area Film Critics Association	6 December 2021	Best Supporting Actor	Ciarán Hinds	Nominated	
Washington D.C. Area Film Critics Association	6 December 2021	Best Supporting Actress	Caitríona Balfe	Nominated	
Washington D.C. Area Film Critics Association	6 December 2021	Best Acting Ensemble	Belfast	Nominated	
Washington D.C. Area Film Critics Association	6 December 2021	Best Youth Performance	Jude Hill	Nominated	
Washington D.C. Area Film Critics Association	6 December 2021	Best Original Screenplay	Kenneth Branagh	Won	
Washington D.C. Area Film Critics Association	6 December 2021	Best Production Design	Jim Clay, Claire Nia Richards	Nominated	
Washington D.C. Area Film Critics Association	6 December 2021	Best Cinematography	Haris Zambarloukos	Nominated	
Washington D.C. Area Film Critics Association	6 December 2021	Best Editing	Úna Ní Dhonghaíle	Nominated	
American Film Institute Awards	8 December 2021	AFI Special Award	Belfast	Won	
Florida Film Critics Circle	15 December 2021	Best Director	Kenneth Branagh	Nominated	
Florida Film Critics Circle	15 December 2021	Best Original Screenplay	Kenneth Branagh	Nominated	
Florida Film Critics Circle	15 December 2021	Best Supporting Actor	Jamie Dornan	Nominated	
Florida Film Critics Circle	15 December 2021	Breakout Award	Jude Hill	Nominated	
Indiana Film Journalists Association Awards	19 December 2021	Best Picture	Belfast	Nominated	
Indiana Film Journalists Association Awards	19 December 2021	Best Director	Kenneth Branagh	Nominated	
Indiana Film Journalists Association Awards	19 December 2021	Best Ensemble Performance	Belfast	Nominated	
Indiana Film Journalists Association Awards	19 December 2021	Best Supporting Actress	Caitriona Balfe	Nominated	
Indiana Film Journalists Association Awards	19 December 2021	Best Supporting Actor	Ciaran Hinds	Nominated	
Indiana Film Journalists Association Awards	19 December 2021	Breakout Performer of the Year	Jude Hill	Nominated	
St. Louis Film Critics Association	19 December 2021	Best Film	Belfast	Runner-up	
St. Louis Film Critics Association	19 December 2021	Best Director	Kenneth Branagh	Runner-up	
St. Louis Film Critics Association	19 December 2021	Best Supporting Actor	Ciarán Hinds	Runner-up	
St. Louis Film Critics Association	19 December 2021	Best Ensemble	Belfast	Nominated	
St. Louis Film Critics Association	19 December 2021	Best Original Screenplay	Kenneth Branagh	Nominated	
St. Louis Film Critics Association	19 December 2021	Best Cinematography	Haris Zambarloukos	Nominated	
St. Louis Film Critics Association	19 December 2021	Best Editing	Úna Ní Dhonghaíle	Runner-up	
St. Louis Film Critics Association	19 December 2021	Best Scene	Buddy when he hears the rioters approaching	Nominated	
Dallas–Fort Worth Film Critics Association Awards	20 December 2021	Best Picture	Belfast	Nominated	
Dallas–Fort Worth Film Critics Association Awards	20 December 2021	Best Director	Kenneth Branagh	Nominated	
Dallas–Fort Worth Film Critics Association Awards	20 December 2021	Best Screenplay	Kenneth Branagh	Nominated	
Dallas–Fort Worth Film Critics Association Awards	20 December 2021	Best Supporting Actor	Ciaran Hinds	Nominated	
Dallas–Fort Worth Film Critics Association Awards	20 December 2021	Best Supporting Actress	Caitriona Balfe	Nominated	
Alliance of Women Film Journalists	January 2022	Best Film	Belfast	Nominated	
Alliance of Women Film Journalists	January 2022	Best Director	Kenneth Branagh	Nominated	
Alliance of Women Film Journalists	January 2022	Best Actor in a Supporting Role	Jamie Dornan	Nominated	
Alliance of Women Film Journalists	January 2022	Best Actor in a Supporting Role	Ciarán Hinds	Nominated	
Alliance of Women Film Journalists	January 2022	Best Screenplay, Original	Kenneth Branagh	Won	
Alliance of Women Film Journalists	January 2022	Best Ensemble Cast – Casting Director	Lucy Bevan, Emily Brockmann	Nominated	
Alliance of Women Film Journalists	January 2022	Best Cinematography	Haris Zambarloukos	Nominated	
Alliance of Women Film Journalists	January 2022	Best Editing	Úna Ní Dhonghaíle	Nominated	
Alliance of Women Film Journalists	January 2022	Grand Dame Award	Judi Dench	Won	
Capri Hollywood International Film Festival	3 January 2022	Best Supporting Actor	Jamie Dornan	Won	
Capri Hollywood International Film Festival	3 January 2022	Best Original Screenplay	Kenneth Branagh	Won	
Palm Springs International Film Festival	7 January 2022	Chairman's Vanguard Award (Note: Announced in advance.)	Kenneth Branagh, Caitríona Balfe, Jamie Dornan, Ciarán Hinds and Jude Hill	Won	
Hollywood Critics Association	8 January 2022	Newcomer Award	Jude Hill	Won	
Hollywood Critics Association	8 January 2022	Best Picture	Belfast	Nominated	
Hollywood Critics Association	8 January 2022	Best Supporting Actor	Jamie Dornan	Nominated	
Hollywood Critics Association	8 January 2022	Best Supporting Actor	Ciarán Hinds	Nominated	
Hollywood Critics Association	8 January 2022	Best Supporting Actress	Caitríona Balfe	Nominated	
Hollywood Critics Association	8 January 2022	Best Cast Ensemble	Belfast	Won	
Hollywood Critics Association	8 January 2022	Best Director	Kenneth Branagh	Nominated	
Hollywood Critics Association	8 January 2022	Best Original Screenplay	Kenneth Branagh	Nominated	
Hollywood Critics Association	8 January 2022	Best Original Song	"Down to Joy" sung by Van Morrison	Nominated	
Hollywood Critics Association	8 January 2022	Best Film Editing	Úna Ní Dhonghaíle	Nominated	
Golden Globe Awards	9 January 2022	Best Motion Picture – Drama	Belfast	Nominated	
Golden Globe Awards	9 January 2022	Best Director	Kenneth Branagh	Nominated	
Golden Globe Awards	9 January 2022	Best Screenplay	Kenneth Branagh	Won	
Golden Globe Awards	9 January 2022	Best Supporting Actor	Jamie Dornan	Nominated	
Golden Globe Awards	9 January 2022	Best Supporting Actor	Ciarán Hinds	Nominated	
Golden Globe Awards	9 January 2022	Best Supporting Actress	Caitríona Balfe	Nominated	
Golden Globe Awards	9 January 2022	Best Original Song	"Down to Joy" sung by Van Morrison	Nominated	
San Diego Film Critics Society	10 January 2022	Best Picture	Belfast	Runner-up	
San Diego Film Critics Society	10 January 2022	Best Director	Kenneth Branagh	Runner-up	
San Diego Film Critics Society	10 January 2022	Best Actor	Jude Hill	Nominated	
San Diego Film Critics Society	10 January 2022	Best Actress	Caitríona Balfe	Won	
San Diego Film Critics Society	10 January 2022	Best Supporting Actor	Ciarán Hinds	Nominated	
San Diego Film Critics Society	10 January 2022	Best Original Screenplay	Kenneth Branagh	Runner-up	
San Diego Film Critics Society	10 January 2022	Best Breakthrough Artist	Jude Hill	Runner-up	
San Diego Film Critics Society	10 January 2022	Best Editing	Úna Ní Dhonghaíle	Runner-up	
San Diego Film Critics Society	10 January 2022	Best Production Design	Jim Clay	Nominated	
San Diego Film Critics Society	10 January 2022	Best Sound Design	Simon Chase and James Mather	Runner-up	
San Diego Film Critics Society	10 January 2022	Best Use of Music	Belfast	Runner-up	
San Diego Film Critics Society	10 January 2022	Best Youth Performance	Jude Hill	Won	
Iowa Film Critics Association	15 January 2022	Best Picture	Belfast	Won	
Iowa Film Critics Association	15 January 2022	Best Director	Kenneth Branagh	Runner-up	
Iowa Film Critics Association	15 January 2022	Best Supporting Actress	Caitriona Balfe	Runner-up	
Iowa Film Critics Association	15 January 2022	Best Supporting Actor	Ciaran Hinfds	Runner-up	
Iowa Film Critics Association	15 January 2022	Best Supporting Actor	Jamie Dornan	Runner-up	
Iowa Film Critics Association	15 January 2022	Best Song	"Down To Joy"	Runner-up	
Houston Film Critics Society	19 January 2022	Best Picture	Belfast	Nominated	
Houston Film Critics Society	19 January 2022	Best Director	Kenneth Branagh	Nominated	
Houston Film Critics Society	19 January 2022	Best Screenplay	Kenneth Branagh	Nominated	
Houston Film Critics Society	19 January 2022	Best Supporting Actor	Ciarán Hinds	Nominated	
Houston Film Critics Society	19 January 2022	Best Ensemble Cast	Cast of Belfast	Nominated	
Online Film Critics Society Awards	24 January 2021	Best Picture	Belfast	Nominated	
Online Film Critics Society Awards	24 January 2021	Best Original Screenplay	Kenneth Branagh	Nominated	
Online Film Critics Society Awards	24 January 2021	Best Supporting Actor	Ciaran Hinds	Nominated	
Online Film Critics Society Awards	24 January 2021	Best Editing	Úna Ní Dhonghaíle	Nominated	
AACTA International Awards	26 January 2022	Best Film	Belfast	Nominated	
AACTA International Awards	26 January 2022	Best Direction	Kenneth Branagh	Nominated	
AACTA International Awards	26 January 2022	Best Screenplay	Kenneth Branagh	Nominated	
AACTA International Awards	26 January 2022	Best Supporting Actor	Jamie Dornan	Nominated	
AACTA International Awards	26 January 2022	Best Supporting Actor	Ciarán Hinds	Nominated	
AACTA International Awards	26 January 2022	Best Supporting Actress	Caitríona Balfe	Nominated	
AACTA International Awards	26 January 2022	Best Supporting Actress	Judi Dench	Won	
London Film Critics' Circle Awards	6 February 2022	Best Film	Belfast	Nominated	
London Film Critics' Circle Awards	6 February 2022	Best British/Irish Film	Belfast	Nominated	
London Film Critics' Circle Awards	6 February 2022	Best Supporting Actor	Ciaran Hinds	Nominated	
London Film Critics' Circle Awards	6 February 2022	Young British/Irish Performer	Jude Hill	Nominated	
Georgia Film Critics Association Awards	8 February 2022	Best Picture	Belfast	Nominated	
Georgia Film Critics Association Awards	8 February 2022	Best Original Screenplay	Kenneth Branagh	Nominated	
Georgia Film Critics Association Awards	8 February 2022	Best Supporting Actor	Ciaran Hinds	Nominated	
Georgia Film Critics Association Awards	8 February 2022	Breakthrough Award	Jude Hill	Nominated	
Screen Actors Guild Awards	27 February 2022	Outstanding Performance by a Cast in a Motion Picture	Caitríona Balfe, Judi Dench, Jamie Dornan, Jude Hill, Ciarán Hinds, and Colin Morgan	Nominated	
Screen Actors Guild Awards	27 February 2022	Outstanding Performance by a Female Actor in a Supporting Role	Caitríona Balfe	Nominated	
Toronto Film Critics Association Awards	7 March 2022	Best Supporting Actor	Ciaran Hinds	Nominated	
Vancouver Film Critics Circle Awards	7 March 2021	Best Film	Belfast	Nominated	
Vancouver Film Critics Circle Awards	7 March 2021	Best Director	Kenneth Branagh	Nominated	
Directors Guild of America Awards	12 March 2022	Outstanding Directing – Feature Film	Kenneth Branagh	Nominated	
Irish Film and Television Awards	12 March 2022	Best Picture	Belfast	Nominated	
Irish Film and Television Awards	12 March 2022	Best Director	Kenneth Branagh	Nominated	
Irish Film and Television Awards	12 March 2022	Best Screenplay	Kenneth Branagh	Won	
Irish Film and Television Awards	12 March 2022	Best Lead Actor	Jude Hill	Nominated	
Irish Film and Television Awards	12 March 2022	Best Supporting Actor	Ciarán Hinds	Won	
Irish Film and Television Awards	12 March 2022	Best Supporting Actor	Jamie Dornan	Nominated	
Irish Film and Television Awards	12 March 2022	Best Supporting Actress	Caitríona Balfe	Nominated	
Irish Film and Television Awards	12 March 2022	Best Editing	Úna Ní Dhonghaíle	Nominated	
Irish Film and Television Awards	12 March 2022	Best Original Music	Van Morrison	Nominated	
Irish Film and Television Awards	12 March 2022	Best Makeup and Hair	Sian Wilson	Nominated	
British Academy Film Award	13 March 2022	Best Film	Belfast	Nominated	
British Academy Film Award	13 March 2022	Best Actor in a Supporting Role	Ciarán Hinds	Nominated	
British Academy Film Award	13 March 2022	Best Actress in a Supporting Role	Caitríona Balfe	Nominated	
British Academy Film Award	13 March 2022	Best Original Screenplay	Kenneth Branagh	Nominated	
British Academy Film Award	13 March 2022	Best Editing	Úna Ní Dhonghaíle	Nominated	
British Academy Film Award	13 March 2022	Outstanding British Film	Kenneth Branagh	Won	
Critics' Choice Awards	13 March 2022	Best Picture	Belfast	Nominated	
Critics' Choice Awards	13 March 2022	Best Director	Kenneth Branagh	Nominated	
Critics' Choice Awards	13 March 2022	Best Supporting Actress	Caitríona Balfe	Nominated	
Critics' Choice Awards	13 March 2022	Best Supporting Actor	Jamie Dornan	Nominated	
Critics' Choice Awards	13 March 2022	Best Supporting Actor	Ciarán Hinds	Nominated	
Critics' Choice Awards	13 March 2022	Best Young Performer	Jude Hill	Won	
Critics' Choice Awards	13 March 2022	Best Acting Ensemble	Belfast	Won	
Critics' Choice Awards	13 March 2022	Best Original Screenplay	Kenneth Branagh	Won	
Critics' Choice Awards	13 March 2022	Best Cinematography	Haris Zambarloukos	Nominated	
Critics' Choice Awards	13 March 2022	Best Editing	Úna Ní Dhonghaíle	Nominated	
Critics' Choice Awards	13 March 2022	Best Production Design	Jim Clay and Claire Nia Richards	Nominated	
AARP Movies for Grownups Awards	18 March 2022	Best Movie for Grownups	Belfast	Won	
AARP Movies for Grownups Awards	18 March 2022	Best Director	Kenneth Branagh	Nominated	
AARP Movies for Grownups Awards	18 March 2022	Best Supporting Actor	Ciarán Hinds	Nominated	
AARP Movies for Grownups Awards	18 March 2022	Best Supporting Actress	Judi Dench	Nominated	
AARP Movies for Grownups Awards	18 March 2022	Best Screenwriter	Kenneth Branagh	Nominated	
AARP Movies for Grownups Awards	18 March 2022	Best Intergenerational Film	Belfast	Nominated	
AARP Movies for Grownups Awards	18 March 2022	Best Time Capsule	Belfast	Nominated	
AARP Movies for Grownups Awards	18 March 2022	Best Grownup Love Story	Belfast	Nominated	
Producers Guild of America Awards	19 March 2022	Best Theatrical Motion Picture	Laura Berwick, Kenneth Branagh, Becca Kovacik, and Tamar Thomas	Nominated	
American Society of Cinematographers Awards	20 March 2022	Outstanding Achievement in Cinematography in Theatrical Releases	Haris Zambarloukos	Nominated	
Artios Awards	23 March 2022	Best Casting for Studio or Independent − Drama	Lucy Bevan, Emily Brockmann, Carla Strong (Location casting)	Nominated	
Golden Raspberry Awards	26 March 2022	Razzie Redeemer Award	Jamie Dornan	Nominated	
Academy Awards	27 March 2022	Best Picture	Laura Berwick, Kenneth Branagh, Becca Kovacik and Tamar Thomas	Nominated	
Academy Awards	27 March 2022	Best Director	Kenneth Branagh	Nominated	
Academy Awards	27 March 2022	Best Supporting Actor	Ciarán Hinds	Nominated	
Academy Awards	27 March 2022	Best Supporting Actress	Judi Dench	Nominated	
Academy Awards	27 March 2022	Best Original Screenplay	Kenneth Branagh	Won	
Academy Awards	27 March 2022	Best Original Song	Van Morrison for "Down to Joy"	Nominated	
Academy Awards	27 March 2022	Best Sound	Denise Yarde, Simon Chase, James Mather and Niv Adiri	Nominated	
Satellite Awards	2 April 2022	Best Motion Picture – Drama	Belfast	Won	
Satellite Awards	2 April 2022	Best Director	Kenneth Branagh	Nominated	
Satellite Awards	2 April 2022	Best Supporting Actor	Jamie Dornan	Nominated	
Satellite Awards	2 April 2022	Best Supporting Actor	Ciarán Hinds	Nominated	
Satellite Awards	2 April 2022	Best Supporting Actress	Caitríona Balfe	Nominated	
Satellite Awards	2 April 2022	Best Supporting Actress	Judi Dench	Nominated	
Satellite Awards	2 April 2022	Best Original Screenplay	Kenneth Branagh	Won	
Satellite Awards	2 April 2022	Best Cinematography	Haris Zambarloukos	Nominated	
Satellite Awards	2 April 2022	Best Editing	Úna Ní Dhonghaíle	Nominated	
Satellite Awards	2 April 2022	Best Art Direction and Production Design	Jim Clay and Claire Nia Richards	Nominated	
Satellite Awards	2 April 2022	Best Costume Design	Charlotte Walter	Nominated	
Satellite Awards	2 April 2022	Best Original Song	"Down to Joy" – Van Morrison	Nominated	
Satellite Awards	2 April 2022	Best Sound	Niv Adiri, Simon Chase, James Mather, and Denise Yarde	Nominated	
David di Donatello	3 May 2022	Best Foreign Film	Belfast	Won	
National Film Awards UK	4 July 2022	Best Newcomer	Olive Tennant	Won	
National Film Awards UK	4 July 2022	Best British Film	Belfast	Won	
National Film Awards UK	4 July 2022	Best Feature Film	Belfast	Won	
National Film Awards UK	4 July 2022	Best Actress	Judi Dench	Nominated	
National Film Awards UK	4 July 2022	Best Supporting Actor	Ciaran Hinds	Nominated	
National Film Awards UK	4 July 2022	Outstanding Performance	Jude Hill	Nominated	
National Film Awards UK	4 July 2022	Outstanding Performance	Jamie Dornan	Nominated	
European Film Awards	10 December 2022	Best Production Designer	Jim Clay	Won	
European Film Awards	10 December 2022	Best Costume Designer	Charlotte Walter	Won	
European Film Awards	10 December 2022	Best Screenwriter	Kenneth Branagh	Nominated	
Robert Awards	4 February 2023	Best English Language Film	Belfast	Nominated	
Cínema Writers Circle Awards	6 February 2023	Best Foreign Film	Belfast	Nominated	
Goya Awards	11 February 2023	Best European Film	Belfast	Nominated	
Bodil Awards	27 March 2023	Best Non-American Film	Belfast	Nominated	

== See also ==
- 2021 in film
