= Mariana Méndez =

Mexican film producer

- Born: Mariana Méndez Alejandre; 10 November 1992 (age 33); Guadalajara, Mexico
- Education: New York Film Academy, New York University Stern School of Business
- Occupation: Film producer

Mariana Méndez (born November 10, 1992) is a Mexican film producer based in the United States.

== Early life and education ==
Méndez was born in Guadalajara, Mexico in 1992. She earned a bachelor's degree in Film & TV Production from the New York Film Academy in 2015. She also earned an MBA from New York University Stern School of Business in 2024.

== Career ==
Méndez has produced notable films, including Oscar-nominated shorts in both the live action and animation spaces.

In 2024, her animated film HUMO was shortlisted at the 96th Oscars. It was also nominated for an Annie Award, and was the recipient of the 2024 Ariel Award, Mexico's highest film honor.

From 2017 to 2025, Méndez supported the execution of Academy Award campaigns for entertainment companies such as Apple, Focus Features, GKIDS, Searchlight, and Warner Bros. She led campaigns for Oscar-winning shorts such as I’m Not a Robot (2025), The Neighbor’s Window (2020), and Skin (2019), as well as Oscar-nominated shorts including Bestia (2022), Ala Kachuu - Take and Run (2022), Le Pupille (2023), and The Last Ranger (2025).

In 2025, Méndez co-founded Double M Films alongside Oscar nominee Maria Brendle.
