= Nadine Lüchinger =

Swiss film producer

- Born: September 16, 1978 (age 48); Switzerland
- Education: University of Zurich
- Occupations: Producer, Director

Nadine Lüchinger (born September 16, 1978) is a Swiss film producer based in Zurich. She has been nominated for her film Ala Kachuu – Take and Run by Maria Brendle for the Best Live Action Short Film at the 94th Academy Awards.

== Life and career ==
In 2010, Nadine Lüchinger graduated in Cultural Anthropology, Economics, and Political Sciences at the University of Zurich with a focus on Visual Anthropology. During her field research in Argentina, she produced, directed, and cut the documentary LIFE IN BUBBLES, which was shown at international festivals and won two awards. From 2010 she worked for various renowned Swiss production companies before becoming a producer at Filmgerberei in 2014, where she built up the department for feature films and documentaries and produced several award-winning films and a web series. In 2022, she was nominated for an Oscar® with the short film ALA KACHUU. She produced her first feature-length documentary EVERYTHING ABOUT MARTIN SUTER. EVERYTHING EXCEPT THE TRUTH, which premiered at the 2022 Locarno Film Festival on the Piazza Grande, and IMMORTALS by Maja Tschumi, which premiered at CPH:DOX in the international competition in 2023. Recently, the short film UNSER KIND by Samuel Flückiger won Best of Fest at LA Shorts and qualifies for the 97^{th} Academy Awards. She is a member of the Academy of Motion Pictures and Art Sciences and the European Film Academy.

== Filmography ==
As Producer

- Doug & Walter by Samuel Morris (2016)
- Puppenspiel by Ares Ceylan (2016)
- The witcher by Maja Tschumi (2017)
- Regimes by Maja Tschumi (2019)
- Metta da fein by Urs Berlinger & Carlo Beer (2020)
- Ala Kachuu – Take and Run by Maria Brendle (2020)
- Everything about Martin Suter. Everything but the truth by André Schäfer (2022)
- There is no End to This Story by Cosima Frei, Duc Ngo Ngoc (2022)
- Immortals by Maja Tschumi (2023)
- Unser Kind - Our Child by Samuel Flückiger (2023)
- 8 to 18 - A Family Album by Cosima Frei (2030)

As director

- Life in Bubbles (2008)

== Accolade(s) ==
List of awards and nominations
Award	Date of ceremony	Category	Film	Result	Ref.
Academy Awards	94th Academy Awards	Academy Award for Best Live Action Short Film	Ala Kachuu – Take and Run	Nominated	
