= Dorota Pomykała =

Polish actress

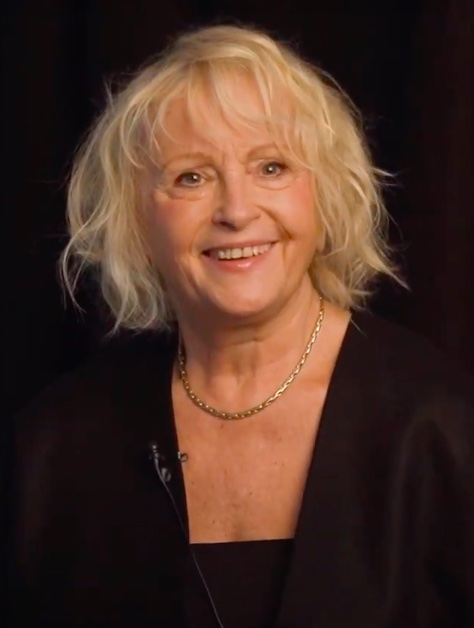
- Pomykała in 2023
- Born: 3 July 1956 (age 69); Świerklaniec, Poland
- Occupation: Actress
- Years active: 1979–present

Dorota Pomykała (born 3 July 1956) is a Polish actress.

== Life and career ==
Born in Świerklaniec, Poland, Pomykała graduated from the AST National Academy of Theatre Arts in Kraków in 1979. The same year, she made her screen debut in a supporting role in the historical drama film Ojciec królowej, and had an uncredited part in Agnieszka Holland's comedy-drama Provincial Actors. Since then, she has appeared in more than 40 motion pictures, and has been honoured with Poland's Bronze Cross of Merit (1989) and the City of Kraków Award (2023) for contributions to culture.

A prolific stage actress, Pomykała has performed at the Kraków Old Theatre regularly since 1979, and also appeared on stage at the Kraków Bagatela (1999–2000, 2002) and Juliusz Słowacki (2000) theatres, the Łódź New Theatre (1994), the Warsaw Variety Theatre (1995) and the Kielce Stefan Żeromski Theatre (1999). She appeared in over 60 television plays.

Pomykała received the Robert Award for Best Actress in a Leading Role for the 1990 film Kajs fødselsdag, and the Gdynia Film Festival Award for Best Actress in a Supporting Role for the 2002 film Moje miasto. For her leading role in the 2022 drama film Woman on the Roof, she received the Polish Academy Award for Best Actress, the Polish Film Festival Award for Best Actress in a Leading Role, and the Tribeca Festival Award for Best Actress in a Narrative Feature Film.

== Selected filmography ==
- Ojciec królowej (1979)
- Provincial Actors (1979)
- A Trap (1997)
- Retrieval (2006)
- BrzydUla (2008–2009, 2020–2022)
- The Dress (2020)
- Zaprawdę Hitler umarł (2025) as Leni Riefenstahl
