= 94th Academy Awards =

- Official poster
- Date: March 27, 2022
- Site: Dolby Theatre; Hollywood, Los Angeles, California, U.S.
- Hosted by: Regina Hall; Amy Schumer; Wanda Sykes
- Preshow hosts: Vanessa Hudgens; Terrence J; Brandon Maxwell; Sofia Carson
- Produced by: Will Packer; Shayla Cowan
- Directed by: Glenn Weiss

Highlights
- Best Picture: CODA
- Most awards: Dune (6)
- Most nominations: The Power of the Dog (12)

TV in the United States
- Network: ABC
- Duration: 3 hours, 40 minutes
- Ratings: 16.62 million; 9.0% (Nielsen ratings)

The 94th Academy Awards ceremony, presented by the Academy of Motion Picture Arts and Sciences (AMPAS), took place on March 27, 2022, at the Dolby Theatre in Hollywood, Los Angeles. The awards were scheduled after their usual late February date to avoid conflicting with both the 2022 Winter Olympics and Super Bowl LVI, with the latter being held in nearby Inglewood, California. During the gala, the AMPAS presented Academy Awards (commonly referred to as Oscars) in 23 categories honoring films released from March 1 to December 31, 2021. The ceremony, televised in the United States by ABC, was produced by Will Packer and Shayla Cowan and was directed by Glenn Weiss. Actresses Regina Hall, Amy Schumer, and Wanda Sykes hosted the show for the first time. Two days earlier, in an event held at the Ray Dolby Ballroom of the Ovation Hollywood complex in Hollywood, the Academy held its 12th annual Governors Awards ceremony.

CODA won three awards, including Best Picture. Other winners included Dune with six awards, The Eyes of Tammy Faye with two, and Belfast, Cruella, Drive My Car, Encanto, King Richard, The Long Goodbye, No Time to Die, The Power of the Dog, The Queen of Basketball, Summer of Soul, West Side Story and The Windshield Wiper with one each.

The ceremony received negative reviews due to a controversial incident in which Best Actor winner Will Smith slapped comedian Chris Rock after Rock made a joke about Smith's wife, Jada Pinkett Smith, who shaved her head due to alopecia areata. In response, the Academy banned Smith from attending its events for a decade as punishment. Criticism was also directed toward the decision to present eight categories separate from the main telecast. The telecast drew 16.62 million viewers in the United States.

== Winners and nominees ==
The nominees for the 94th Academy Awards were announced on February 8, 2022, by actors Leslie Jordan and Tracee Ellis Ross. The Power of the Dog led all nominees with twelve nominations; Dune came in second with ten. The winners were announced during the awards ceremony on March 27.

CODA became the first Best Picture winner to be distributed via a streaming platform and the first one starring a primarily deaf cast. Its three nominations were the fewest for any Best Picture winner since 1932's Grand Hotel, and it was the first Best Picture winner without directing or film editing nominations since the aforementioned film. Furthermore, it became the first without any nominations in the below-the-line categories since 1980's Ordinary People.

Best Director winner Jane Campion was the third woman to win the award and the first woman to be nominated twice, having previously been nominated for 1993's The Piano. The Power of the Dog became the first film to win Best Director as its sole award since 1967's The Graduate. Best Original Screenplay winner Kenneth Branagh was the first person to have been nominated in seven different categories throughout his career, having also been nominated as director and as one of the producers for Belfast.

Best Supporting Actor winner Troy Kotsur became the first deaf man and second deaf individual overall to win an acting award. (Note: Kotsur's co-star Marlee Matlin was the first deaf performer to earn an acting award, having won Best Actress for her performance in 1986's Children of a Lesser God.) Best Supporting Actress winner Ariana DeBose was the first Afro-Latina person and first openly queer woman of color to win an acting Oscar. Furthermore, as a result of her win for portraying Anita in the 2021 film adaptation of the Broadway musical West Side Story, she and Rita Moreno, who previously won for playing the same character in the 1961 film adaptation, became the third pair of actors to win for portraying the same character in two different films. (Note: Marlon Brando and Robert De Niro were the first pair of actors to achieve this feat. Brando won Best Actor for portraying Vito Corleone in 1972's The Godfather; De Niro won Best Supporting Actor for portraying a younger version of the same character in 1974's The Godfather Part II. Heath Ledger and Joaquin Phoenix later repeated this feat by virtue of their wins for their performances as the Joker in 2008's The Dark Knight and 2019's Joker, respectively.)

Nominated for their performances as Leda Caruso in The Lost Daughter, Best Actress nominee Olivia Colman and Best Supporting Actress nominee Jessie Buckley were the third pair of actresses nominated for portraying the same character in the same film. (Note: Previously, Kate Winslet and Gloria Stuart first achieved this distinction by virtue of their nominations for their performances as two versions of Rose DeWitt Bukater in 1997's Titanic. Winslet would again achieve this distinction with Judi Dench for their performances as two different versions of the titular character in 2001's Iris.) Flee became the first film to be nominated for Best Animated Feature, Best International Feature Film, and Best Documentary Feature in the same year.

=== Awards ===
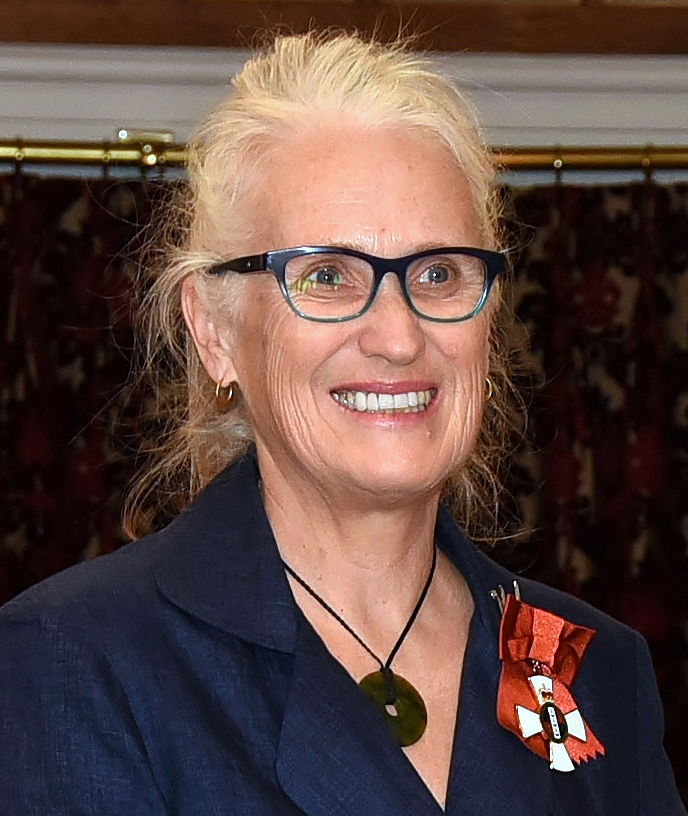
Jane Campion, Best Director winner

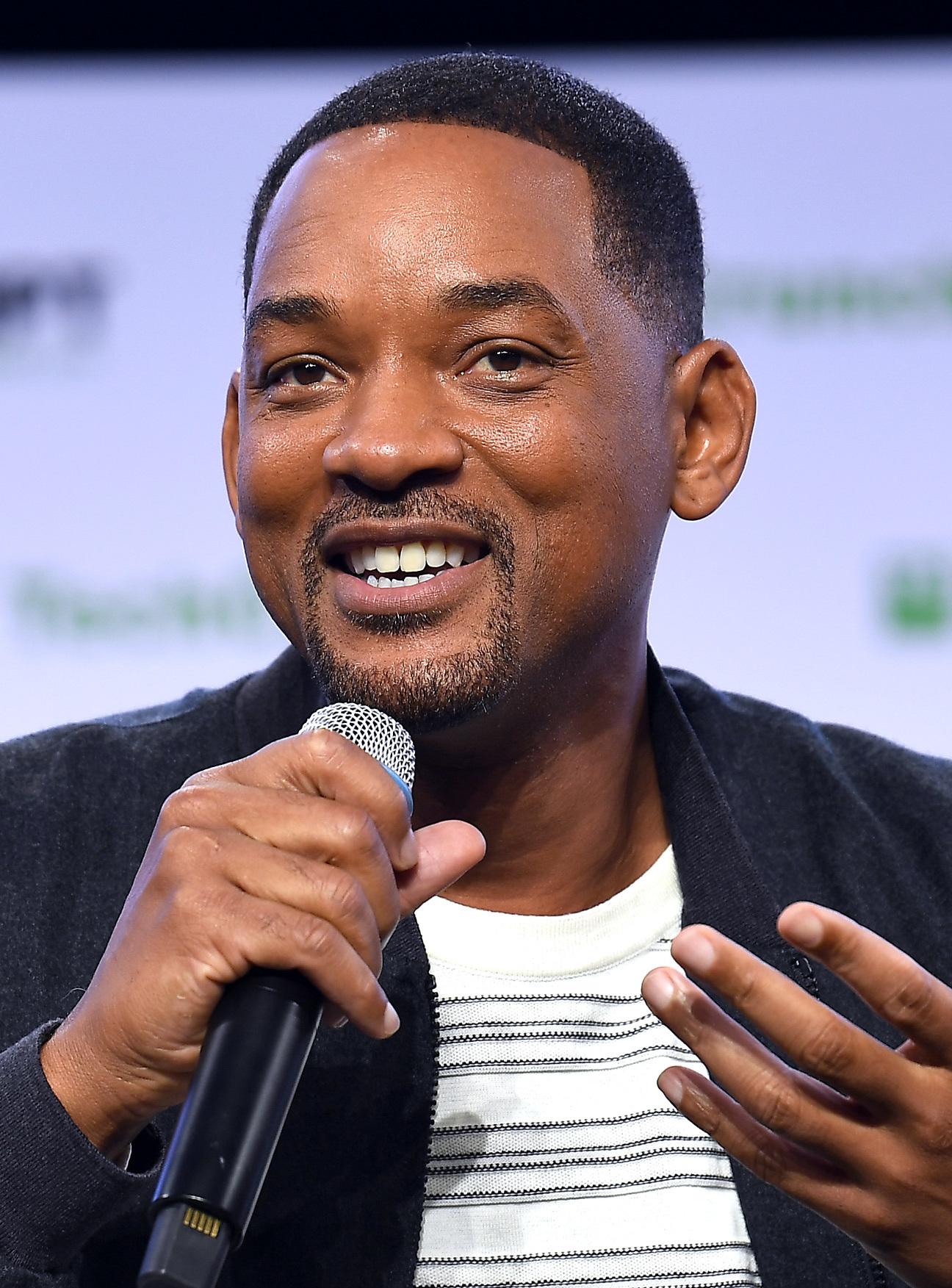
Will Smith, Best Actor winner

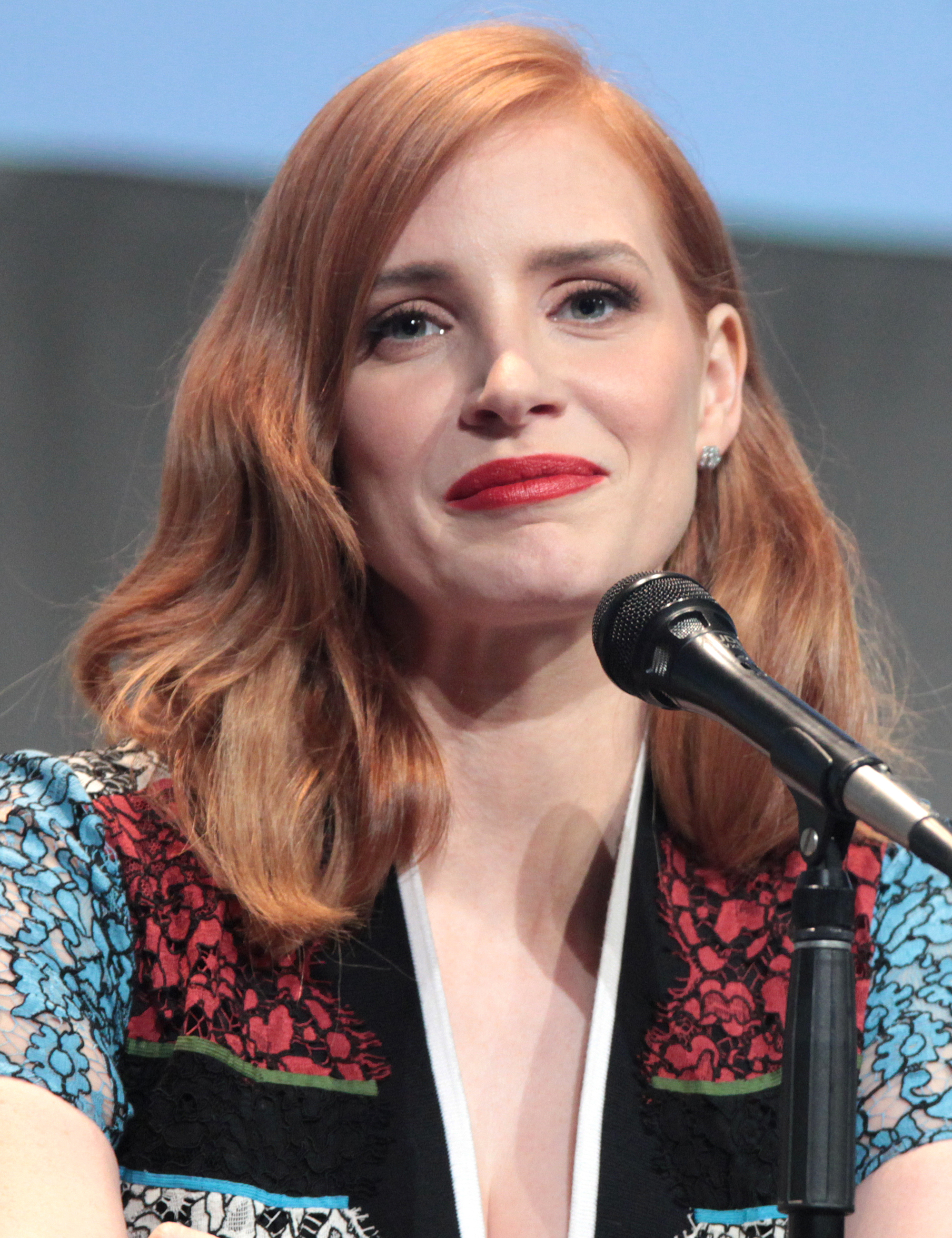
Jessica Chastain, Best Actress winner

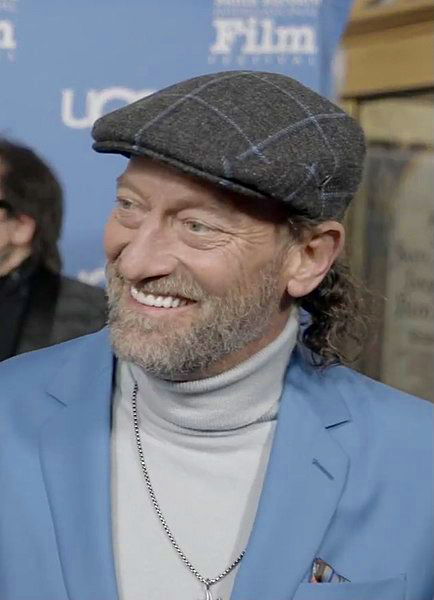
Troy Kotsur, Best Supporting Actor winner

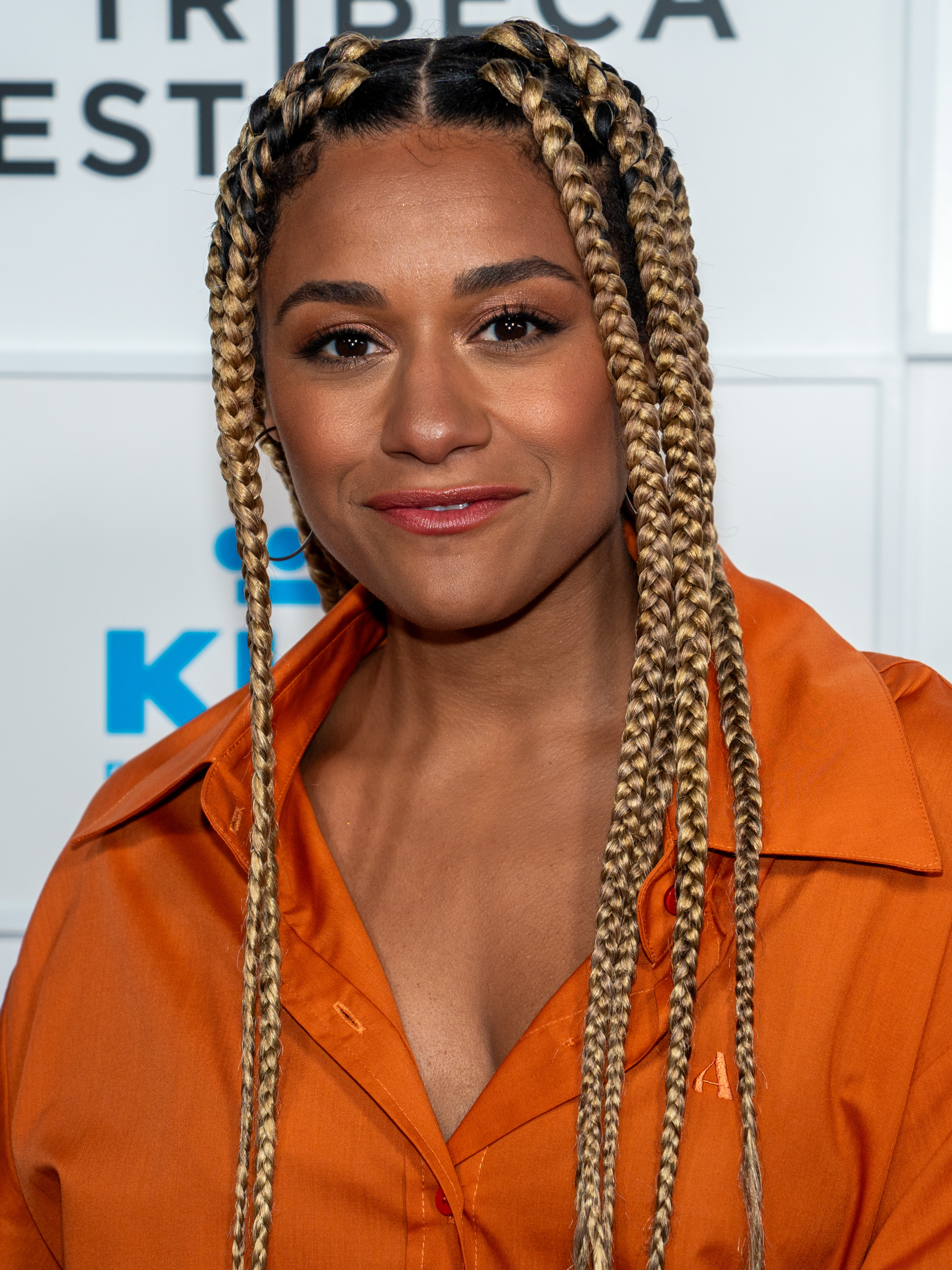
Ariana DeBose, Best Supporting Actress winner

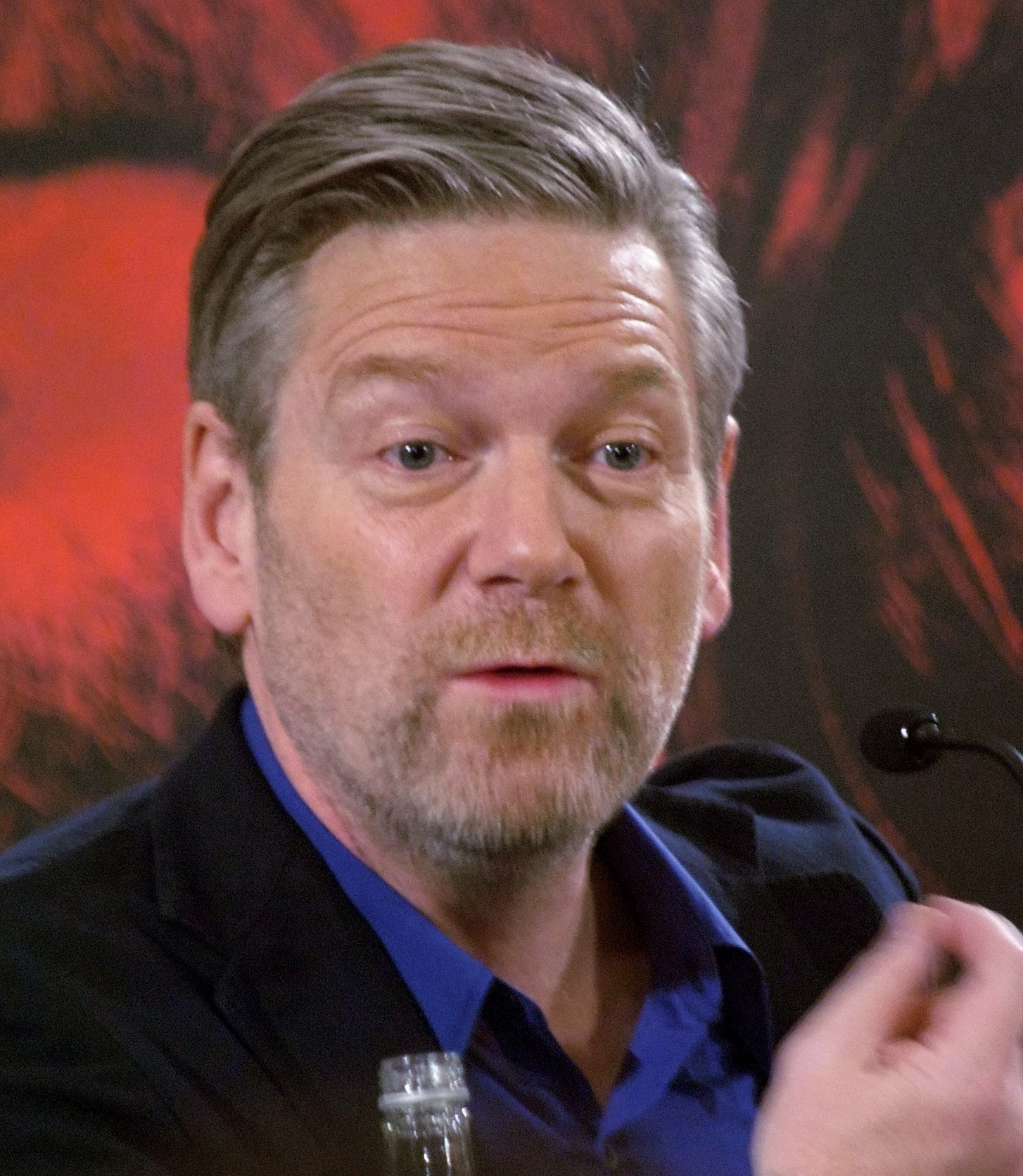
Kenneth Branagh, Best Original Screenplay winner

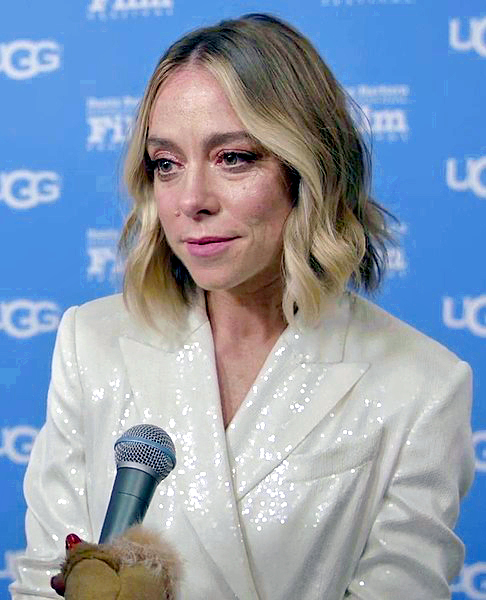
Sian Heder, Best Adapted Screenplay winner

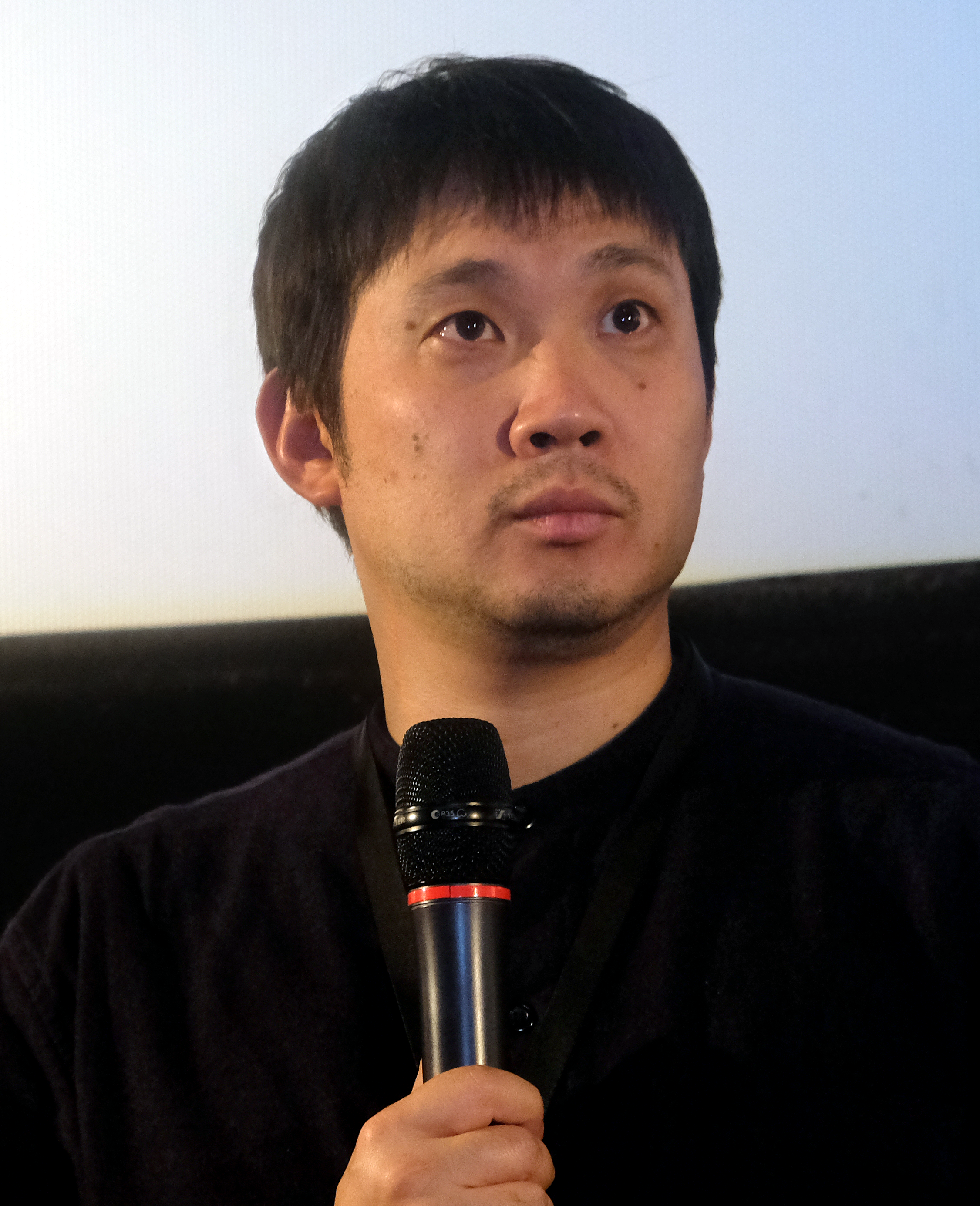
Ryusuke Hamaguchi, Best International Feature Film winner

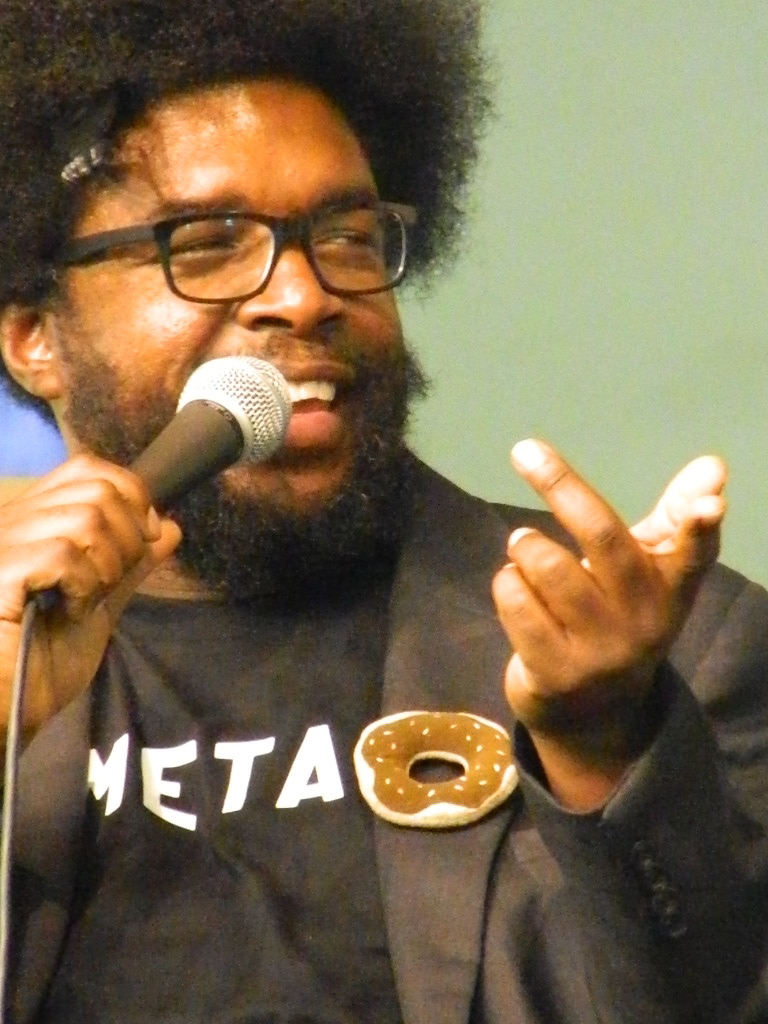
Questlove, Best Documentary Feature co-winner

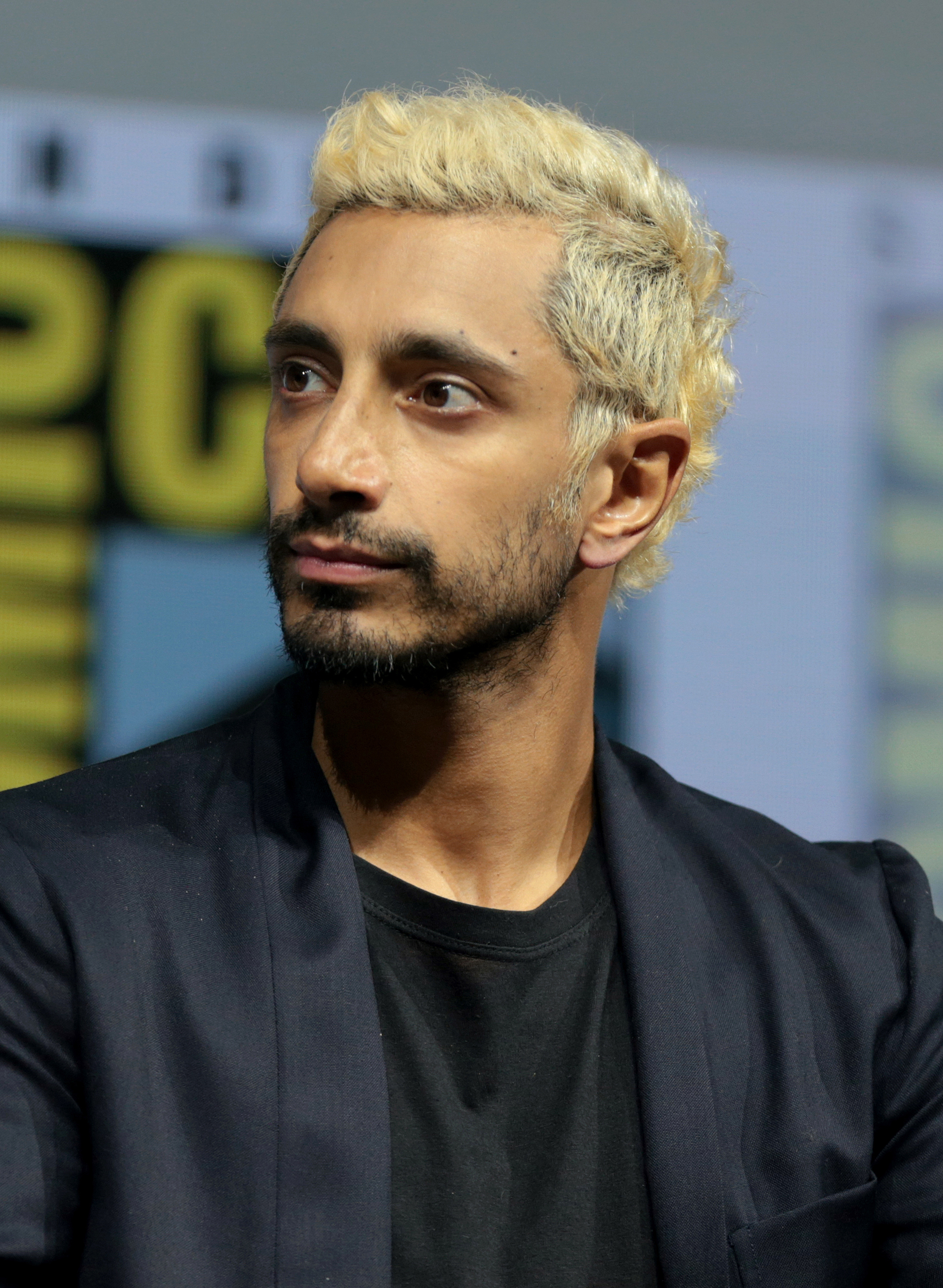
Riz Ahmed, Best Live Action Short Film co-winner

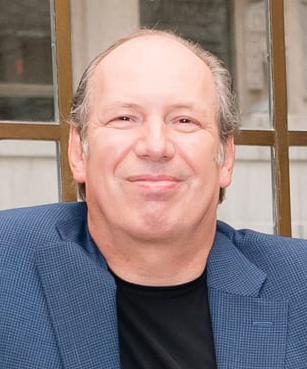
Hans Zimmer, Best Original Score winner

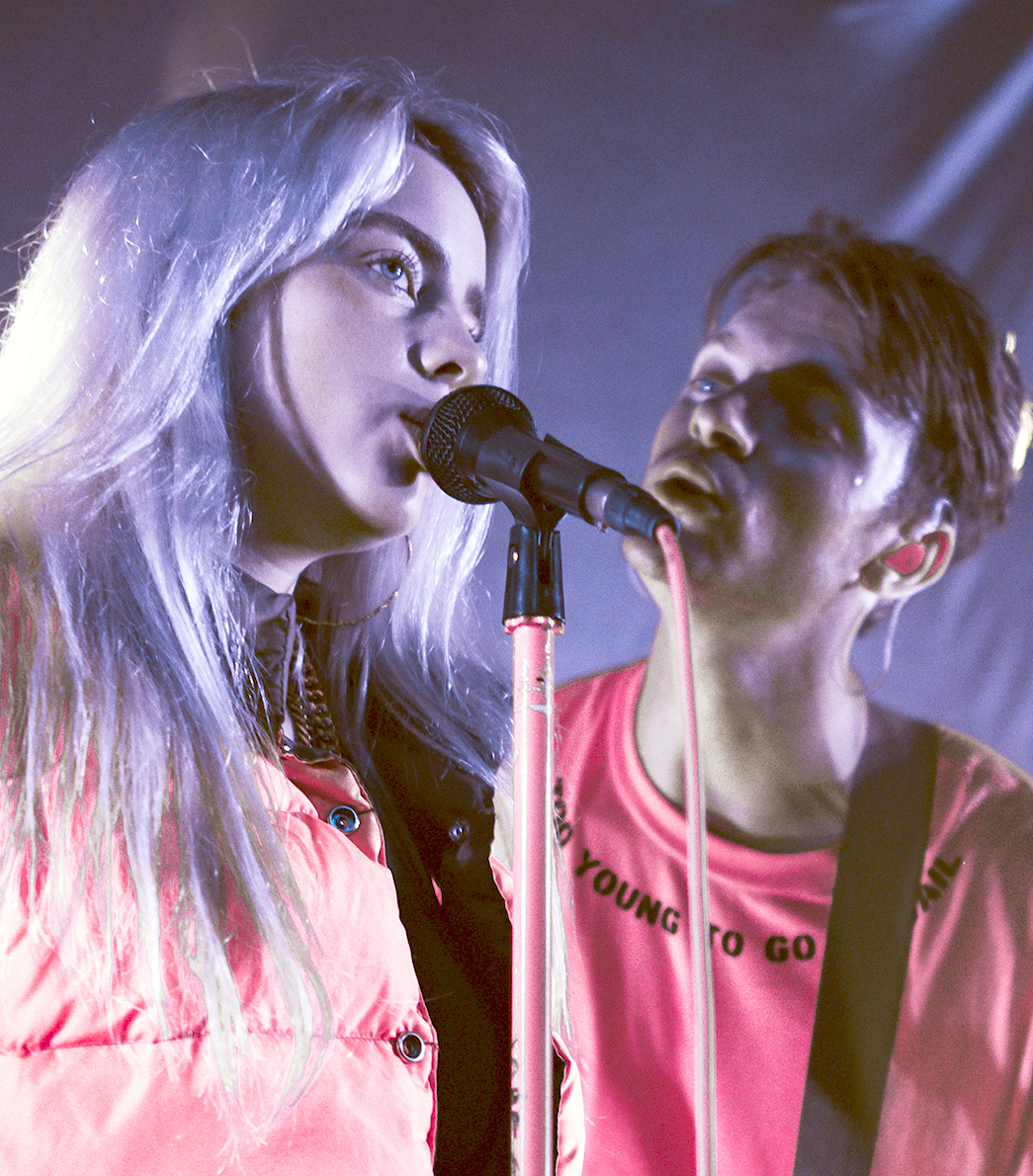
Billie Eilish and Finneas O'Connell, Best Original Song winners

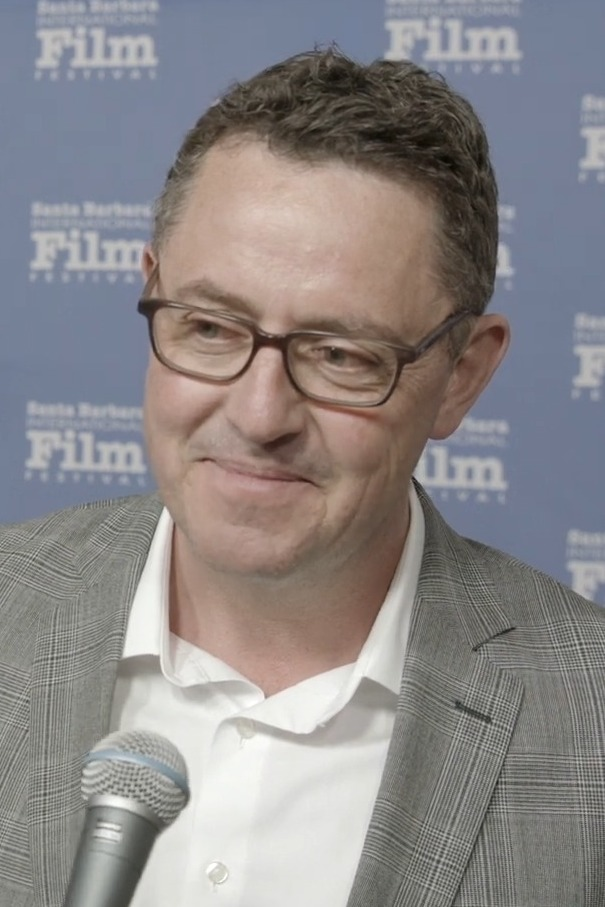
Greig Fraser, Best Cinematography winner

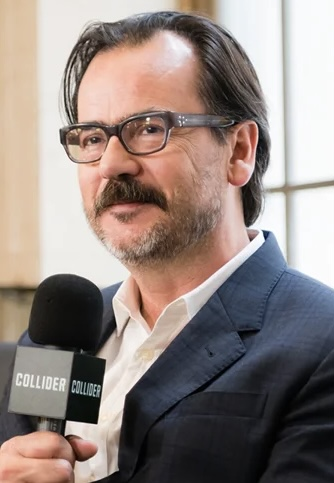
Joe Walker, Best Film Editing winner

Winners are listed first, highlighted in boldface, and indicated with a double dagger (‡).

**Best Picture**: **CODA – Philippe Rousselet, Fabrice Gianfermi and Patrick Wachsberger, producers**‡; Belfast – Laura Berwick, Kenneth Branagh, Becca Kovacik and Tamar Thomas, producers; Don't Look Up – Adam McKay and Kevin Messick, producers; Drive My Car – Teruhisa Yamamoto, producer; Dune – Mary Parent, Denis Villeneuve and Cale Boyter, producers; King Richard – Tim White, Trevor White and Will Smith, producers; Licorice Pizza – Sara Murphy, Adam Somner and Paul Thomas Anderson, producers; Nightmare Alley – Guillermo del Toro, J. Miles Dale and Bradley Cooper, producers; The Power of the Dog – Jane Campion, Tanya Seghatchian, Emile Sherman, Iain Canning and Roger Frappier, producers; West Side Story – Steven Spielberg and Kristie Macosko Krieger, producers	**Best Directing**: **Jane Campion – The Power of the Dog**‡; Kenneth Branagh – Belfast; Ryusuke Hamaguchi – Drive My Car; Paul Thomas Anderson – Licorice Pizza; Steven Spielberg – West Side Story
**Best Actor in a Leading Role**: **Will Smith – King Richard as Richard Williams**‡; Javier Bardem – Being the Ricardos as Desi Arnaz; Benedict Cumberbatch – The Power of the Dog as Phil Burbank; Andrew Garfield – Tick, Tick... Boom! as Jonathan Larson; Denzel Washington – The Tragedy of Macbeth as Lord Macbeth	**Best Actress in a Leading Role**: **Jessica Chastain – The Eyes of Tammy Faye as Tammy Faye Bakker**‡; Olivia Colman – The Lost Daughter as Leda Caruso; Penélope Cruz – Parallel Mothers as Janis Martínez Moreno; Nicole Kidman – Being the Ricardos as Lucille Ball; Kristen Stewart – Spencer as Diana Spencer
**Best Actor in a Supporting Role**: **Troy Kotsur – CODA as Frank Rossi**‡; Ciarán Hinds – Belfast as Pop; Jesse Plemons – The Power of the Dog as George Burbank; J. K. Simmons – Being the Ricardos as William Frawley; Kodi Smit-McPhee – The Power of the Dog as Peter Gordon	**Best Actress in a Supporting Role**: **Ariana DeBose – West Side Story as Anita**‡; Jessie Buckley – The Lost Daughter as young Leda Caruso; Judi Dench – Belfast as Granny; Kirsten Dunst – The Power of the Dog as Rose Gordon; Aunjanue Ellis – King Richard as Oracene "Brandy" Price
**Best Writing (Original Screenplay)**: **Belfast – Kenneth Branagh**‡; Don't Look Up – Screenplay by Adam McKay; Story by Adam McKay and David Sirota; King Richard – Zach Baylin; Licorice Pizza – Paul Thomas Anderson; The Worst Person in the World – Eskil Vogt and Joachim Trier	**Best Writing (Adapted Screenplay)**: **CODA – Sian Heder; based on the original motion picture screenplay La Famille Bélier written by Victoria Bedos, Thomas Bidegain, Stanislas Carré de Malberg and Éric Lartigau**‡; Drive My Car – Ryusuke Hamaguchi and Takamasa Oe; based on the short story by Haruki Murakami; Dune – Jon Spaihts, Denis Villeneuve and Eric Roth; based on the novel by Frank Herbert; The Lost Daughter – Maggie Gyllenhaal; based on the novel by Elena Ferrante; The Power of the Dog – Jane Campion; based on the novel by Thomas Savage
**Best Animated Feature Film**: **Encanto – Jared Bush, Byron Howard, Yvett Merino and Clark Spencer**‡; Flee – Jonas Poher Rasmussen, Monica Hellström, Signe Byrge Sørensen and Charlotte de la Gournerie; Luca – Enrico Casarosa and Andrea Warren; The Mitchells vs. the Machines – Mike Rianda, Phil Lord, Christopher Miller and Kurt Albrecht; Raya and the Last Dragon – Don Hall, Carlos López Estrada, Osnat Shurer and Peter Del Vecho	**Best International Feature Film**: **Drive My Car (Japan) in Japanese – directed by Ryusuke Hamaguchi**‡; Flee (Denmark) in Danish – directed by Jonas Poher Rasmussen; The Hand of God (Italy) in Italian – directed by Paolo Sorrentino; Lunana: A Yak in the Classroom (Bhutan) in Dzongkha – directed by Pawo Choyning Dorji; The Worst Person in the World (Norway) in Norwegian – directed by Joachim Trier
**Best Documentary (Feature)**: **Summer of Soul (...Or, When the Revolution Could Not Be Televised) – Ahmir "Questlove" Thompson, Joseph Patel, Robert Fyvolent and David Dinerstein**‡; Ascension – Jessica Kingdon, Kira Simon-Kennedy and Nathan Truesdell; Attica – Stanley Nelson and Traci A. Curry; Flee – Jonas Poher Rasmussen, Monica Hellström, Signe Byrge Sørensen and Charlotte de la Gournerie; Writing with Fire – Rintu Thomas and Sushmit Ghosh	**Best Documentary (Short Subject)**: **The Queen of Basketball – Ben Proudfoot**‡; Audible – Matthew Ogens and Geoff McLean; Lead Me Home – Pedro Kos and Jon Shenk; Three Songs for Benazir – Elizabeth Mirzaei and Gulistan Mirzaei; When We Were Bullies – Jay Rosenblatt
**Best Short Film (Live Action)**: **The Long Goodbye – Aneil Karia and Riz Ahmed**‡; Ala Kachuu – Take and Run – Maria Brendle and Nadine Lüchinger; The Dress – Tadeusz Łysiak and Maciej Ślesicki; On My Mind – Martin Strange-Hansen and Kim Magnusson; Please Hold – K.D. Dávila and Levin Menekse	**Best Short Film (Animated)**: **The Windshield Wiper – Alberto Mielgo and Leo Sanchez**‡; Affairs of the Art – Joanna Quinn and Les Mills; Bestia – Hugo Covarrubias and Tevo Díaz; Boxballet – Anton Dyakov; Robin Robin – Dan Ojari and Mikey Please
**Best Music (Original Score)**: **Dune – Hans Zimmer**‡; Don't Look Up – Nicholas Britell; Encanto – Germaine Franco; Parallel Mothers – Alberto Iglesias; The Power of the Dog – Jonny Greenwood	**Best Music (Original Song)**: **"No Time to Die" from No Time to Die – Music and lyrics by Billie Eilish and Finneas O'Connell**‡; "Be Alive" from King Richard – Music and lyrics by DIXSON and Beyoncé Knowles-Carter; "Dos Oruguitas" from Encanto – Music and lyrics by Lin-Manuel Miranda; "Down to Joy" from Belfast – Music and lyrics by Van Morrison; "Somehow You Do" from Four Good Days – Music and lyrics by Diane Warren
**Best Sound**: **Dune – Mac Ruth, Mark Mangini, Theo Green, Doug Hemphill and Ron Bartlett**‡; Belfast – Denise Yarde, Simon Chase, James Mather and Niv Adiri; No Time to Die – Simon Hayes, Oliver Tarney, James Harrison, Paul Massey and Mark Taylor; The Power of the Dog – Richard Flynn, Robert Mackenzie and Tara Webb; West Side Story – Tod A. Maitland, Gary Rydstrom, Brian Chumney, Andy Nelson and Shawn Murphy	**Best Production Design**: **Dune – Production Design: Patrice Vermette; Set Decoration: Zsuzsanna Sipos**‡; Nightmare Alley – Production Design: Tamara Deverell; Set Decoration: Shane Vieau; The Power of the Dog – Production Design: Grant Major; Set Decoration: Amber Richards; The Tragedy of Macbeth – Production Design: Stefan Dechant; Set Decoration: Nancy Haigh; West Side Story – Production Design: Adam Stockhausen; Set Decoration: Rena DeAngelo
**Best Cinematography**: **Dune – Greig Fraser**‡; Nightmare Alley – Dan Laustsen; The Power of the Dog – Ari Wegner; The Tragedy of Macbeth – Bruno Delbonnel; West Side Story – Janusz Kamiński	**Best Makeup and Hairstyling**: **The Eyes of Tammy Faye – Linda Dowds, Stephanie Ingram and Justin Raleigh**‡; Coming 2 America – Mike Marino, Stacey Morris and Carla Farmer; Cruella – Nadia Stacey, Naomi Donne and Julia Vernon; Dune – Donald Mowat, Love Larson and Eva von Bahr; House of Gucci – Göran Lundström, Anna Carin Lock and Frederic Aspiras
**Best Costume Design**: **Cruella – Jenny Beavan**‡; Cyrano – Massimo Cantini Parrini and Jacqueline Durran; Dune – Jacqueline West and Robert Morgan; Nightmare Alley – Luis Sequeira; West Side Story – Paul Tazewell	**Best Film Editing**: **Dune – Joe Walker**‡; Don't Look Up – Hank Corwin; King Richard – Pamela Martin; The Power of the Dog – Peter Sciberras; Tick, Tick... Boom! – Myron Kerstein and Andrew Weisblum
**Best Visual Effects**: **Dune – Paul Lambert, Tristan Myles, Brian Connor and Gerd Nefzer**‡; Free Guy – Swen Gillberg, Bryan Grill, Nikos Kalaitzidis and Dan Sudick; No Time to Die – Charlie Noble, Joel Green, Jonathan Fawkner and Chris Corbould; Shang-Chi and the Legend of the Ten Rings – Christopher Townsend, Joe Farrell, Sean Noel Walker and Dan Oliver; Spider-Man: No Way Home – Kelly Port, Chris Waegner, Scott Edelstein and Dan Sudick

=== Governors Awards ===
The Academy held its 12th annual Governors Awards ceremony on March 25, 2022, during which the following awards were presented:

==== Honorary Awards ====
- To Samuel L. Jackson, whose dynamic performances resonate across genres and generations of audiences worldwide.
- To Elaine May, writer, director, performer, pioneer whose bracing comedic spark illuminates us all.
- To Liv Ullmann, for her deeply affecting screen portrayals and lifelong commitment to exploring the human condition.

==== Jean Hersholt Humanitarian Award ====
- Danny Glover – "For [his] decades-long advocacy for justice and human rights reflects his dedication to recognizing our shared humanity on and off the screen."

=== Films with multiple nominations and awards ===
Films with multiple nominations
Nominations	Film
12	The Power of the Dog
10	Dune
7	Belfast
7	West Side Story
6	King Richard
4	Don't Look Up
4	Drive My Car
4	Nightmare Alley
3	Being the Ricardos
3	CODA
3	Encanto
3	Flee
3	Licorice Pizza
3	The Lost Daughter
3	No Time to Die
3	The Tragedy of Macbeth
2	Cruella
2	The Eyes of Tammy Faye
2	Parallel Mothers
2	Tick, Tick... Boom!
2	The Worst Person in the World

Films with multiple awards
Awards	Film
6	Dune
3	CODA
2	The Eyes of Tammy Faye

== Presenters and performers ==
The following individuals, listed in order of appearance, presented awards or performed musical numbers.

Presenters
Name(s)	Role
Janora McDuffie	Served as announcer for the 94th Academy Awards
Serena Williams; Venus Williams	Introduced the performance of "Be Alive"
DJ Khaled	Introduced hosts Regina Hall, Amy Schumer, and Wanda Sykes
Daniel Kaluuya; H.E.R.	Presented the award for Best Supporting Actress
Josh Brolin; Jason Momoa	Presented the following awards filmed before the telecast: Best Animated Short Film; Best Documentary Short Subject; Best Film Editing; Best Live Action Short Film; Best Makeup and Hairstyling; Best Original Score; Best Production Design; Best Sound
Woody Harrelson; Rosie Perez; Wesley Snipes	Presented the award for Best Cinematography
Jacob Elordi; Rachel Zegler	Presented the award for Best Visual Effects
Tony Hawk; Kelly Slater; Shaun White	Presented the 60th anniversary tribute to the James Bond series
Stephanie Beatriz	Introduced the performance of "Dos Oruguitas"
Halle Bailey; Lily James; Naomi Scott	Presented the award for Best Animated Feature
Youn Yuh-jung	Presented the award for Best Supporting Actor
Tiffany Haddish; Simu Liu	Presented the award for Best International Feature Film
Mila Kunis	Introduced the performance of "Somehow You Do"
Ruth E. Carter; Lupita Nyong'o	Presented the award for Best Costume Design
John Leguizamo	Introduced the performance of "We Don't Talk About Bruno"
Jennifer Garner; Elliot Page; J. K. Simmons	Presented the award for Best Original Screenplay
Shawn Mendes; Tracee Ellis Ross	Presented the award for Best Adapted Screenplay
Rami Malek	Introduced the performance of "No Time to Die"
Chris Rock	Presented the award for Best Documentary Feature
Sean Combs	Presented the 50th anniversary tribute to The Godfather trilogy
Tyler Perry; Bill Murray; Jamie Lee Curtis	Presented eulogies to Sidney Poitier, Ivan Reitman, and Betty White during the "In Memoriam" segment
Jake Gyllenhaal; Zoë Kravitz	Presented the award for Best Original Song
Kevin Costner	Presented the award for Best Director
John Travolta; Samuel L. Jackson; Uma Thurman	Presented the award for Best Actor
Anthony Hopkins	Presented the award for Best Actress
Lady Gaga; Liza Minnelli	Presented the award for Best Picture

Performers
Name	Role	Work
Adam Blackstone	Musical arranger; Conductor	Orchestral
Beyoncé	Performer	"Be Alive" from King Richard (Note: Beyoncé's performance was pre-recorded at the Venus and Serena Williams Court of Champions in Compton, California.)
Sebastián Yatra	Performer	"Dos Oruguitas" from Encanto
Reba McEntire	Performer	"Somehow You Do" from Four Good Days
Adassa; Stephanie Beatriz; Mauro Castillo; Carolina Gaitán; Diane Guerrero; Becky G Luis Fonsi; Megan Thee Stallion	Performers	"We Don't Talk About Bruno" from Encanto
Billie Eilish; Finneas O'Connell	Performers	"No Time to Die" from No Time to Die
The Samples; Jill Scott	Performers	"I Will Remember You", "Spirit in the Sky", and "Thank You for Being a Friend" during the annual "In Memoriam" tribute

== Ceremony information ==
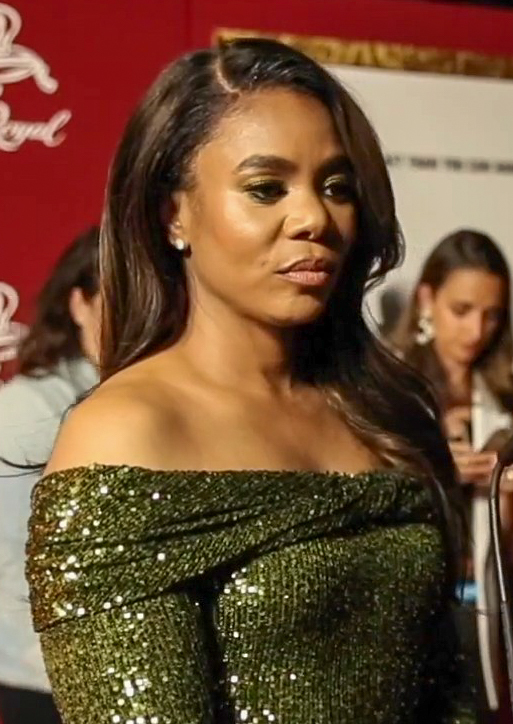
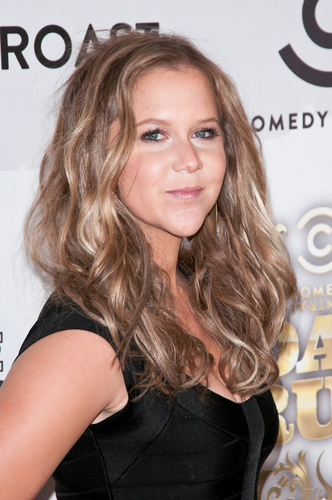
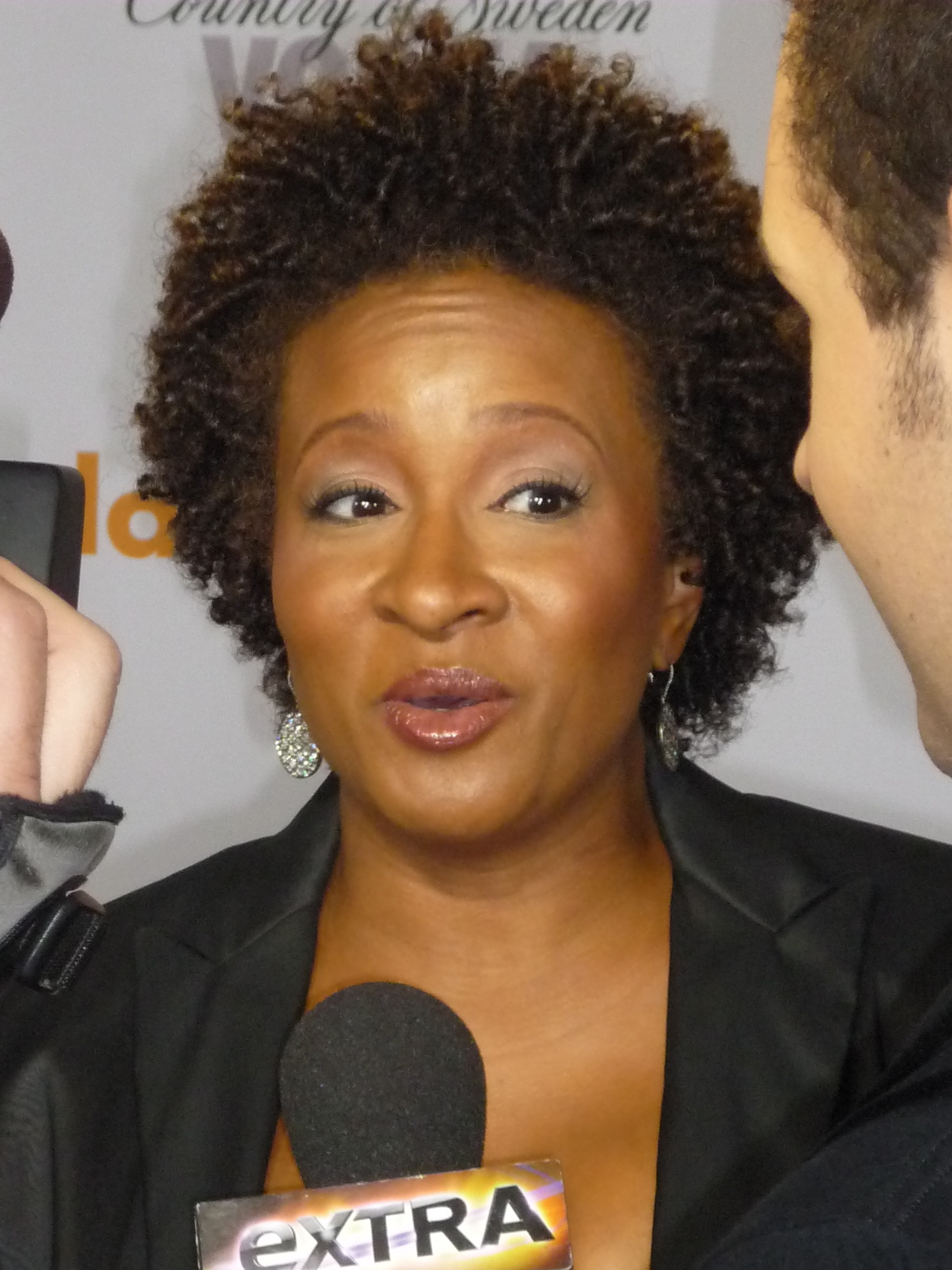
Regina Hall (left), Amy Schumer (center), and Wanda Sykes (right) hosted 94th Academy Awards.

In October 2021, the Academy hired film director and producer Will Packer and his production company chief of staff Shayla Cowan to oversee production of the 2022 ceremony. "Will is a powerhouse producer who has enjoyed success across all movie genres! He's already bringing a boundless energy and a focus on innovation to this year's Oscars, to entertain the widest spectrum of fans. Many wonderful surprises ahead," remarked Academy president David Rubin and CEO Dawn Hudson. In response, Packer expressed his gratitude, saying: "The power, the beauty, the romance of the imagery in movies has always attracted me. I'm fully embracing the challenge of bringing an ode to one of the most iconic mediums in the world to life. What an honor." Four months later, actresses and comedians Regina Hall, Amy Schumer, and Wanda Sykes were announced as hosts of the gala during an interview with Packer on Good Morning America. This marked the first time that three people had shared hosting duties for the Oscars since Chevy Chase, Goldie Hawn, and Paul Hogan presided over the 59th ceremony held in 1987.

This year, the show was centered around the theme "Movie Lovers Unite". In an interview with the Los Angeles Times, Packer explained his reasoning behind the theme, stating: "Some are movie lovers who have seen every single one of the nominated movies, and they've got very specific opinions about who wins. And then you have people who are just casual moviegoers, who perhaps have not seen the awards fare but who also love movies. I'm inviting them in as well. They're just as important to me as a viewer. And I think we can have a show that does both. We can walk and chew gum at the same time." In tandem with the theme, several people from different backgrounds, such as firefighters and healthcare workers, participated in the nominations announcement. DJ Khaled introduced the hosts at the beginning of the telecast, and athletes Tony Hawk, Kelly Slater, and Shaun White introduced a montage saluting the 60th anniversary of the James Bond film franchise.

Also tying in with the ceremony's theme of "Movie Lovers Unite", the Academy teamed up with Twitter to host an "Oscars Fan Favorite" contest, where Twitter users could vote for their favorite film of the year and their favorite movie moment. The contest drew a predominantly negative reaction from Academy members, with some comparing it to the "Popular Film" category initially proposed for the 91st ceremony held in 2019, and others viewing it as an attempt to recognize Spider-Man: No Way Home and its box office performance. Ultimately, Army of the Dead was named the Oscars Fan Favorite, while the Oscars Cheer Moment went to Zack Snyder's Justice League for "The Flash Enters the Speed Force". According to TheWrap, the most active voters were autonomous web programs, although the Academy denied this claim.

The festivities marked their return to the Dolby Theatre after a one-year absence due to the COVID-19 pandemic. In compliance with Los Angeles County health and safety standards, AMPAS announced that attending nominees and guests would need to show proof of vaccination or a valid medical exemption, and two negative PCR tests, in order to attend. Presenters and performers underwent "rigorous testing" but were not required to be vaccinated. Audience members in sections closest to the stage were seated further apart but were not required to wear face masks. Masks were required for attendees in the mezzanine. Additionally, the annual Governors Awards was held on March 25, two days before the main ceremony, after previously being postponed from its original January 15 date due to concerns due to health and safety concerns related to the SARS-CoV-2 Omicron variant.

Production designer David Korins designed a new stage for the show. Music producer and songwriter Adam Blackstone served as musical director for the telecast and conductor for the orchestra, which featured musicians Travis Barker, Sheila E., and Robert Glasper. Rapper D-Nice served as an in-house DJ during the gala. As part of a continued focus on enhancing inclusion and accommodations for disabilities, the Academy offered a live feed of American Sign Language (ASL) interpretation for the ceremony through the Academy Awards' YouTube channel.

=== Rule and eligibility period changes ===
In June 2020, the Academy announced that, starting with the 94th awards, a fixed number of ten films would once again be nominated for Best Picture. According to The Hollywood Reporter, this rule change was initiated in order "to maximize the diversity of the films that are nominated for the Academy's highest honor" as part of the organization's Academy Aperture 2025 equity and inclusion initiative. Previously, AMPAS had experimented with a ten-film Best Picture slate for two years beginning with the 82nd ceremony in 2010 before changing the rules two years later so that a fluctuating number of films would be nominated depending on the nomination voting results.

Due to continued concerns stemming from the COVID-19 pandemic, the Academy decided once again to allow films that were released via video on demand or streaming to be eligible for the awards on the condition that said films were originally scheduled to have a theatrical release prior to the start of the pandemic. However, only feature films released during the ten-month period in 2021 from March 1 to December 31 would be eligible for awards consideration.

=== Removal of categories from the broadcast ===
The presentations and acceptance of eight awards (Best Animated Short Film, Best Documentary Short Subject, Best Film Editing, Best Live Action Short Film, Best Makeup and Hairstyling, Best Original Score, Best Production Design, and Best Sound) were not broadcast live but instead pre-taped an hour before the start of the telecast, in an attempt to "allow more time for comedy, film clips and musical numbers", and to shorten the ceremony; a similar move had been attempted for the 91st Academy Awards in 2019 but had been reversed after being negatively received. The decision was reportedly made under pressure from ABC executives, who had initially demanded that 12 categories be moved off the live broadcast, under the possible penalty of not airing the ceremony at all. Josh Brolin and Jason Momoa presented the awards off the air.

The move was quickly met with significant backlash. Following the announcement, Steven Spielberg said: "All of us are on the same line bringing the best of us to tell the best stories we possibly can. And that means for me we should all have a seat at the supper table together live at 5." More than 70 prominent film professionals—including Guillermo del Toro, James Cameron, Jane Campion, Denis Villeneuve, and John Williams—issued a letter urging the Academy to reverse the plan, which they argued would relegate some nominees to "the status of second-class citizens". Addressed to Academy President David Rubin, the letter claimed that the decision would do "irreparable damage" to the Oscars' reputation by "demeaning the very crafts that, in their most outstanding expressions, make the art of filmmaking worthy of celebration". Best Actress nominee (and eventual winner) Jessica Chastain decided to skip the red carpet and other press to ensure she was in the theater during the Makeup and Hairstyling category to support the team who worked with her on The Eyes of Tammy Faye, stating: "The most important thing for me is to honor the incredible artisans who work in our industry." Sound engineer Tom Fleischman and production sound mixer Peter Kurland resigned from the Academy in protest of the new policy.

=== Chris Rock–Will Smith slapping incident ===
During the presentation for Best Documentary Feature, actor Will Smith walked onstage and slapped presenter and comedian Chris Rock over a joke about the former's wife, Jada Pinkett Smith. Rock remarked: "Jada, I love you. G.I. Jane 2, can't wait to see it," referencing the 1997 film G.I. Jane in which Demi Moore's character wears her hair in a buzz cut. Pinkett Smith was diagnosed with alopecia in 2018 and shaved her head due to the condition. The joke was ad-libbed by Rock and not part of his scripted remarks. After initially laughing, Smith rose from his seat near the stage, walked up to Rock, slapped him, and returned to his seat. Rock said: "Will Smith just smacked the shit out of me." After Smith returned to his seat, he shouted to Rock, twice: "Keep my wife's name out your fucking mouth!" Rock replied: "I'm going to, okay?" to Smith and joked that it was the "greatest night in the history of television" before presenting the award. Commentators noted that although Rock appeared to fumble his subsequent lines, he maintained his composure in the midst of chaos.

An Academy librarian said the altercation was likely the first incident of on-stage violence in Academy Awards history. In the United States, ABC muted the audio due to federal broadcast profanity regulations; however, many international broadcasters use a clear feed and did not censor it, and uncensored recordings of the event went viral on social media. About forty minutes later, Smith won the award for Best Actor for his portrayal of Richard Williams in King Richard. He focused his speech on his need to protect those around him and apologized to the Academy and to the other nominees, but not to Rock; he received a standing ovation. The Economist described his acceptance speech, in which he appealed to God calling on him to do "crazy things" in the name of love, as "dangerous, self-serving cant".

Many celebrities expressed shock, disappointment, and outrage over the incident. The show's production team decided not to remove Smith from the theater, due to time constraints and the desire to avoid another disruption. Rock did not file a police report over the incident. The day after the ceremony, the Academy released a statement condemning Smith's actions and announced an internal review. The same day, Smith formally apologized to Rock, the Academy, the Williams family, and the cast and crew of King Richard in Instagram and Facebook posts; he described his behavior as "unacceptable and inexcusable". Smith later announced his resignation from the Academy on the Friday following the gala. One week later, the Board of Governors banned Smith from all Academy events, including the Academy Awards, for ten years effective that day.

=== Critical reviews ===
Television critic Daniel Fienberg of The Hollywood Reporter wrote: "After a fairly promising first hour, the show had begun to flag in basically the same ways Oscar telecasts always flag, proving conclusively that producer Will Packer's attempt to fix the event was barely a Band-Aid." He concluded by stating: "The 94th Academy Awards – which should have provided either a pleasant distraction from a world starting to emerge from a pandemic or the opportunity for advocacy relating to Russia's invasion of Ukraine and discriminatory laws being passed around the country – will just be remembered as a moment of toxic awfulness and subsequent infection." Variety columnist Caroline Framke quipped: "No matter how desperately ABC and the Academy wanted the ceremony to be a well-oiled machine, this year's Oscars proved the power of live TV, for better and for deeply uncomfortable worse." Kelly Lawler of USA Today commented that despite the attempts by AMPAS and broadcaster ABC to shorten the ceremony while making it more entertaining for viewers at home, remarking: "It was equal parts boring and terrifying, cringe-worthy and interminable."

Los Angeles Times television critic Lorraine Ali wrote: "Overall, the production was much tighter and brighter than in recent years, thanks in large part to powerful music numbers, a diverse mixture of guests, and the bitingly funny trio of hosts, Wanda Sykes, Amy Schumer and Regina Hall." Film critic Richard Roeper of the Chicago Sun-Times praised the hosts' performances, writing: "It was funny, albeit relatively safe stuff." He also noted that despite the Smith–Rock incident disrupting the momentum of the proceedings, the telecast was "one of the most uplifting, groundbreaking, amazing Oscars ever".

=== Ratings and reception ===
The American telecast on ABC drew in an average of 16.62 million people over its length, which was a 60% increase from the previous year's ceremony. The show also earned higher Nielsen ratings compared to the previous ceremony with 9.0% of households watching the ceremony. In addition, it garnered a higher 18–49 demo rating with a 3.76 rating, or 77% viewers in that demographic. It drew 17.561 million viewers in Live+7 ratings, which made it the 23rd most watched telecast in the United States in 2022, behind only sport events.

In July 2022, the broadcast was nominated for three awards at the 74th Primetime Emmys, but it failed to win any of its nominations.

== "In Memoriam" ==
The "In Memoriam" tribute, accompanied by a musical medley performed by musical group The Samples, paid tribute to the following individuals.

- Sidney Poitier – actor, director
- Olympia Dukakis – actress
- William Hurt – actor
- Stephen Sondheim – composer
- Halyna Hutchins – cinematographer
- Ned Beatty – actor
- Peter Bogdanovich – actor, director, writer
- Clarence Williams III – actor
- Chris Huvane – talent manager
- Michael K. Williams – actor
- Jerome Hellman – producer
- Jean-Paul Belmondo – actor
- David H. DePatie – producer
- Martha De Laurentiis – producer
- Irwin W. Young – film laboratory executive, producer
- Sally Kellerman – actress
- Richard Donner – director
- Ivan Reitman – director, producer
- Emi Wada – costume designer
- Yvette Mimieux – actress
- Sonny Chiba – actor, martial artist
- Lina Wertmüller – director, writer
- Douglas Trumbull – visual effects, director, producer
- Brian Goldner – producer
- Robert Blalack – visual effects supervisor
- Felipe Cazals – director, writer
- Saginaw Grant – actor
- Jon Gregory – film editor
- Dorothy Steel – actress
- Dean Stockwell – actor
- Melvin Van Peebles – director, producer, writer, actor
- Alan Ladd Jr. – producer, executive
- David Brenner – film editor
- Don Phillips – casting director, producer
- Bill Taylor – visual effects supervisor, cinematographer
- Norman Lloyd – actor
- Ruthie Tompson – animator
- Brad Allan – stunt performer, stunt coordinator
- Mikis Theodorakis – composer
- Max Julien – actor, writer, producer
- Lewis Erskine – film editor
- Tony Walton – production designer, costume designer
- Steve Schapiro – photographer
- Mace Neufeld – producer, talent manager
- Carmen Salinas – actress
- Paul Mooney – comedian, actor, writer
- Betty White – actress
- Marilyn Bergman – lyricist
- Leslie Bricusse – songwriter, writer
- Marcia Nasatir – executive producer
- Buddy Van Horn – stunt performer, stunt coordinator, director
- Diane Weyermann – producer, executive
- Jane Powell – actress, singer
- Jean-Marc Vallée – director, producer, writer, film editor
- Charles Grodin – actor

During the montage, actors Tyler Perry, Bill Murray, and Jamie Lee Curtis eulogized Poitier, Reitman, and White, respectively. Furthermore, a moment of silence was observed at the end of Reba McEntire's performance of Best Song nominee "Somehow You Do" in light of the Russian invasion of Ukraine.

== See also ==
- List of submissions to the 94th Academy Awards for Best International Feature Film
