= Tadeusz Lysiak =

Polish filmmaker

Tadeusz Łysiak
- Born: Warsaw, Poland
- Citizenship: Poland
- Occupation(s): Director, Screenwriter
- Known for: Oscar Nominated The Dress for Best Live Action Short Film for the 94th Academy Awards.

Tadeusz Łysiak (born in 1993) is a Polish filmmaker. He is mostly known for The Dress, his graduation short film from the Warsaw Film School, for which he received a nomination for the Academy Award for Best Live Action Short Film at the 94th Academy Awards.

== Life and career ==
He was born in 1993 and he is the son of screenwriter Tomasz Łysiak and grandson of writer Waldemar Łysiak. He graduated in Cultural Studies at the University of Warsaw and studied directing at the Warsaw Film School. Tadeusz is currently working on his first long feature Obsession (working title), a psychological thriller set in Poland.

== Filmography ==
- The mirror (2017) – writer, director.
- Techno (2017) – writer, director.
- 1920, The Miracle of the Vistula (2020) – director.
- Masha (2020) – second unit director.
- The Dress (2020) – writer, director.

== Recognition ==
His short filmThe Dress has been nominated for the Academy Award for Best Live Action Short Film for the 94th Academy Awards.
