= Kfar Vitkin =

Moshav in central Israel

Kfar Vitkin: כפר ויתקין (Hebrew)
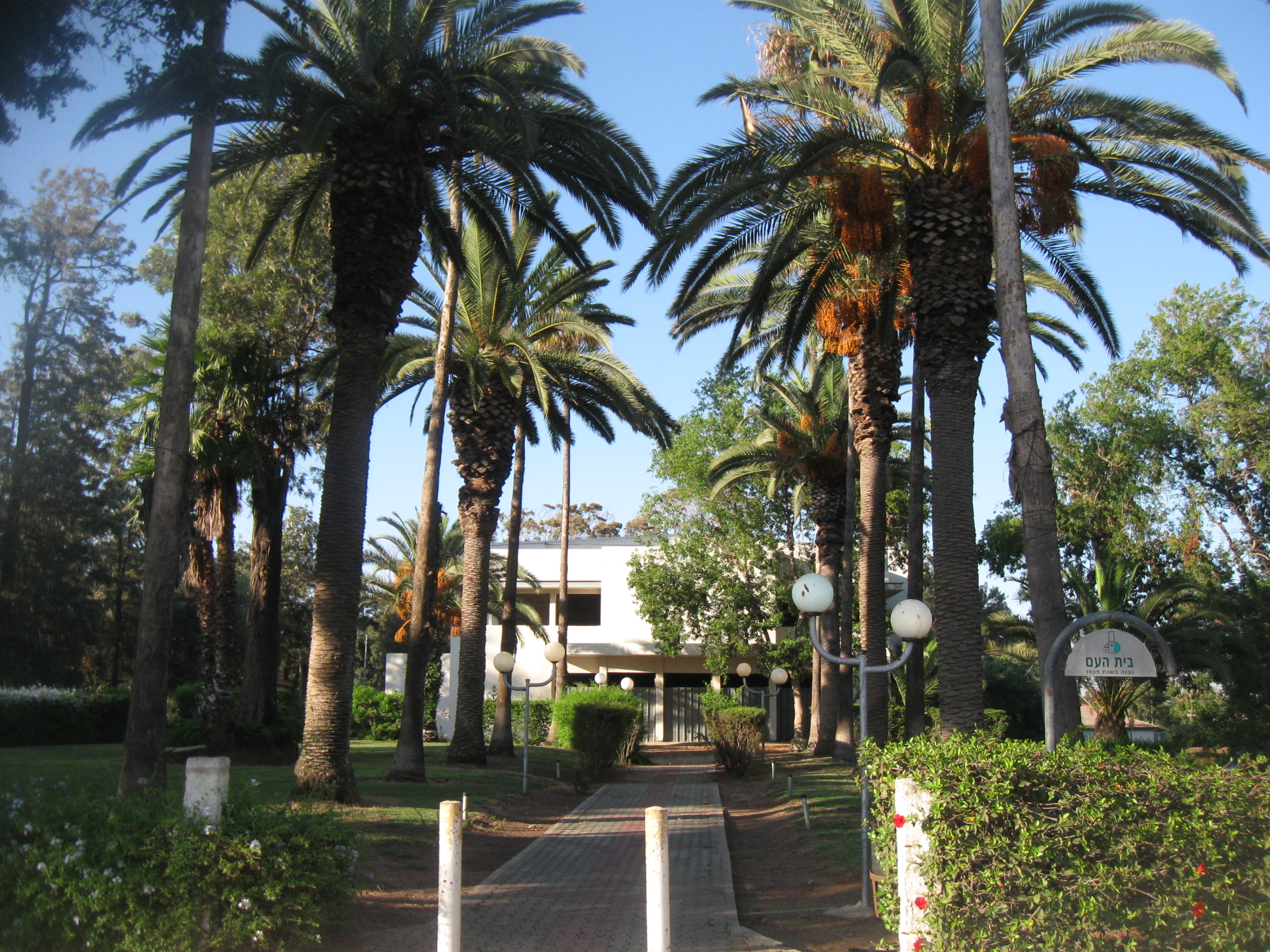

- Location within Central Israel Location within Israel
- Coordinates: 32°22′54″N 34°52′37″E
- Country: Israel
- District: Central
- Subdistrict: HaSharon
- Council: Hefer Valley
- Affiliation: Moshavim Movement
- Founded: 1930
- Population (2024): 2,094

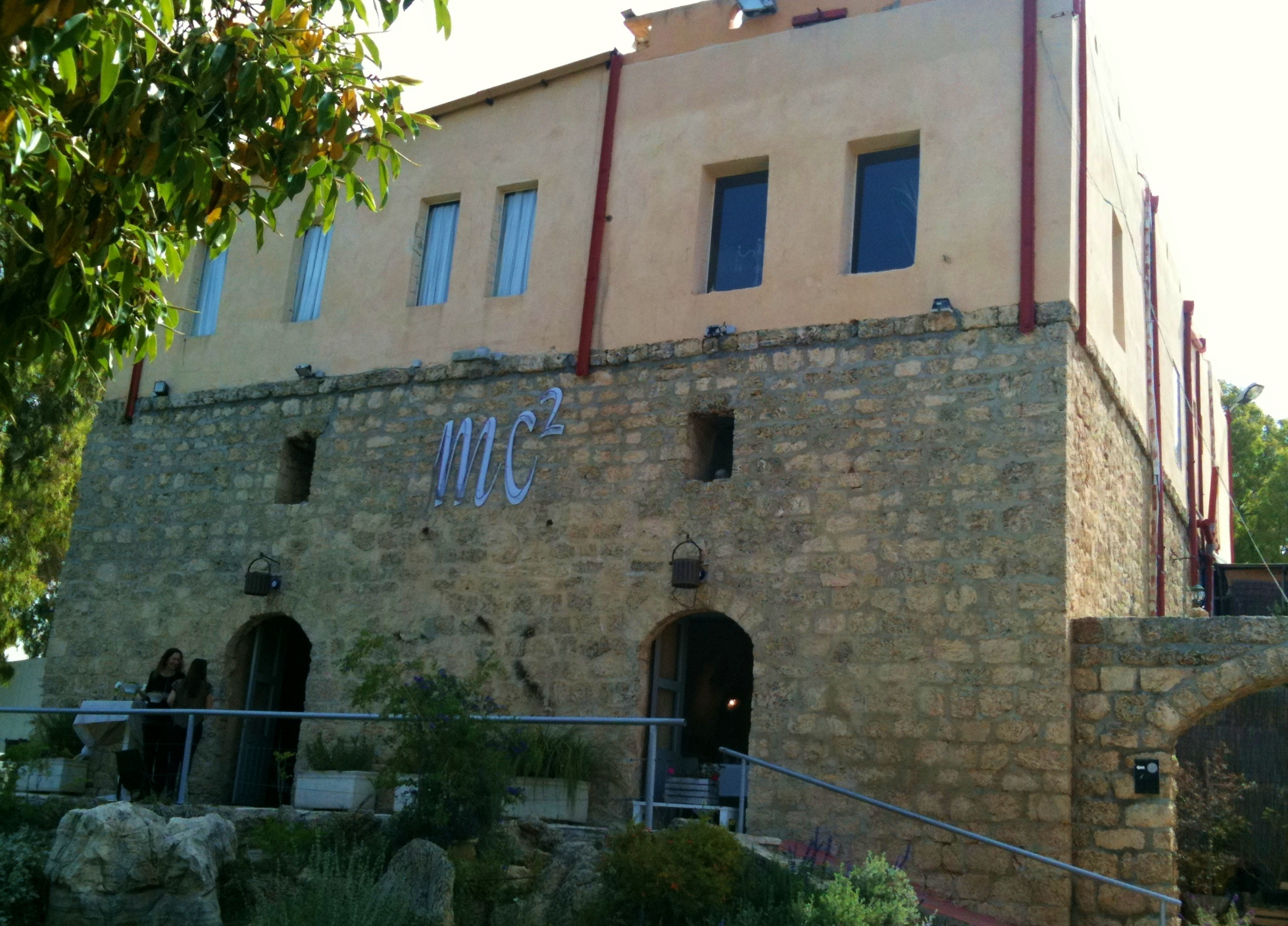
First house of Kfar Vitkin

Kfar Vitkin (Hebrew: כפר ויתקין, lit. 'Vitkin Village') is a moshav in central Israel. Located near Netanya, it falls under the jurisdiction of Hefer Valley Regional Council and was the first Jewish settlement in the valley. In 2024 it had a population of 2,094.

== History ==
The community was established in 1930 by a group of twenty people, and was initially based in an old stone house. The moshav was moved to its final destination in 1933 when the founders moved into new buildings, and was named after Yosef Vitkin, an educator and leader of the Labour movement. The original house became known as "Beit HaRishonim" (House of the First). In 1948, the moshav had a population of 700 Jews. The moshav has 150 farmsteads.

On 20 April 1948 the Irgun gun-running boat, Altalena, began unloading its cargo at Kfar Vitkin. 940 passengers, 2,000 rifles, 2,000,000 rounds, 3,000 shells & 200 Bren guns were brought ashore before the newly formed Israeli army intervened. In the following confrontation two soldiers and six Irgun fighters were killed.

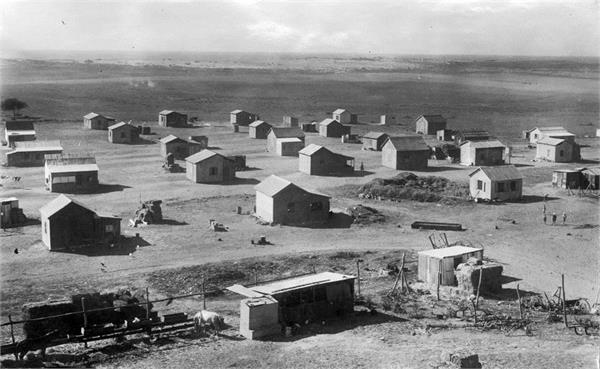
Kfar Vitkin in 1935

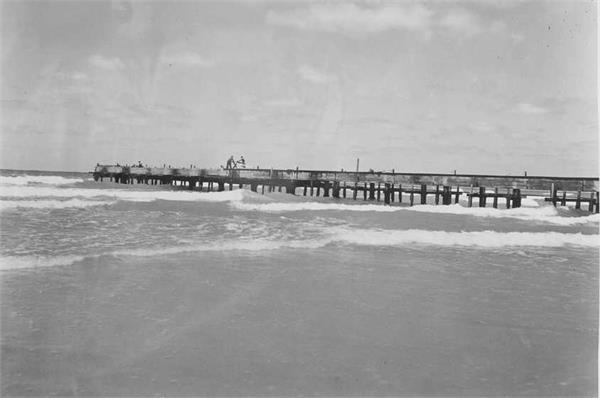
Kfar Vitkin pier under construction in 1935

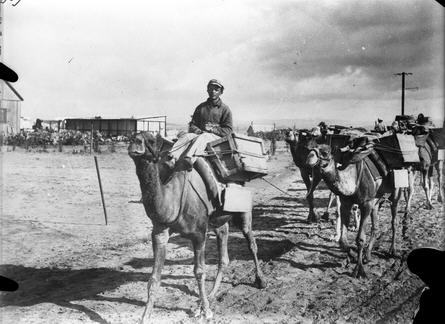
Kfar Vitkin building supplies in 1935

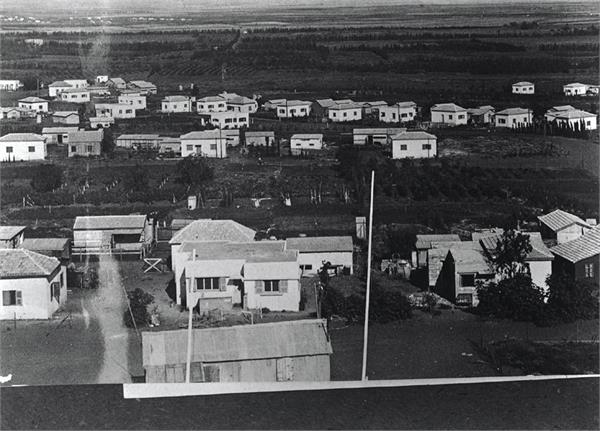
Kfar Vitkin in 1937

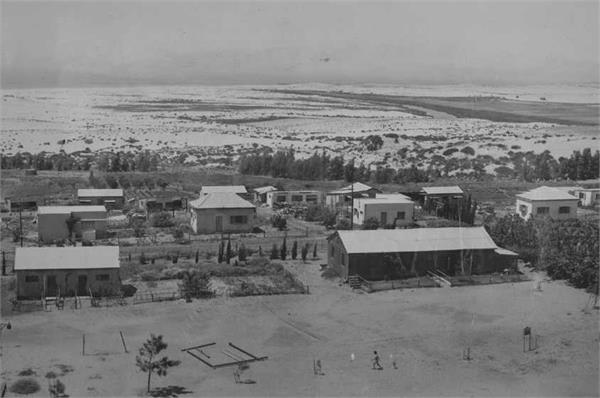
Kfar Vitkin in 1938

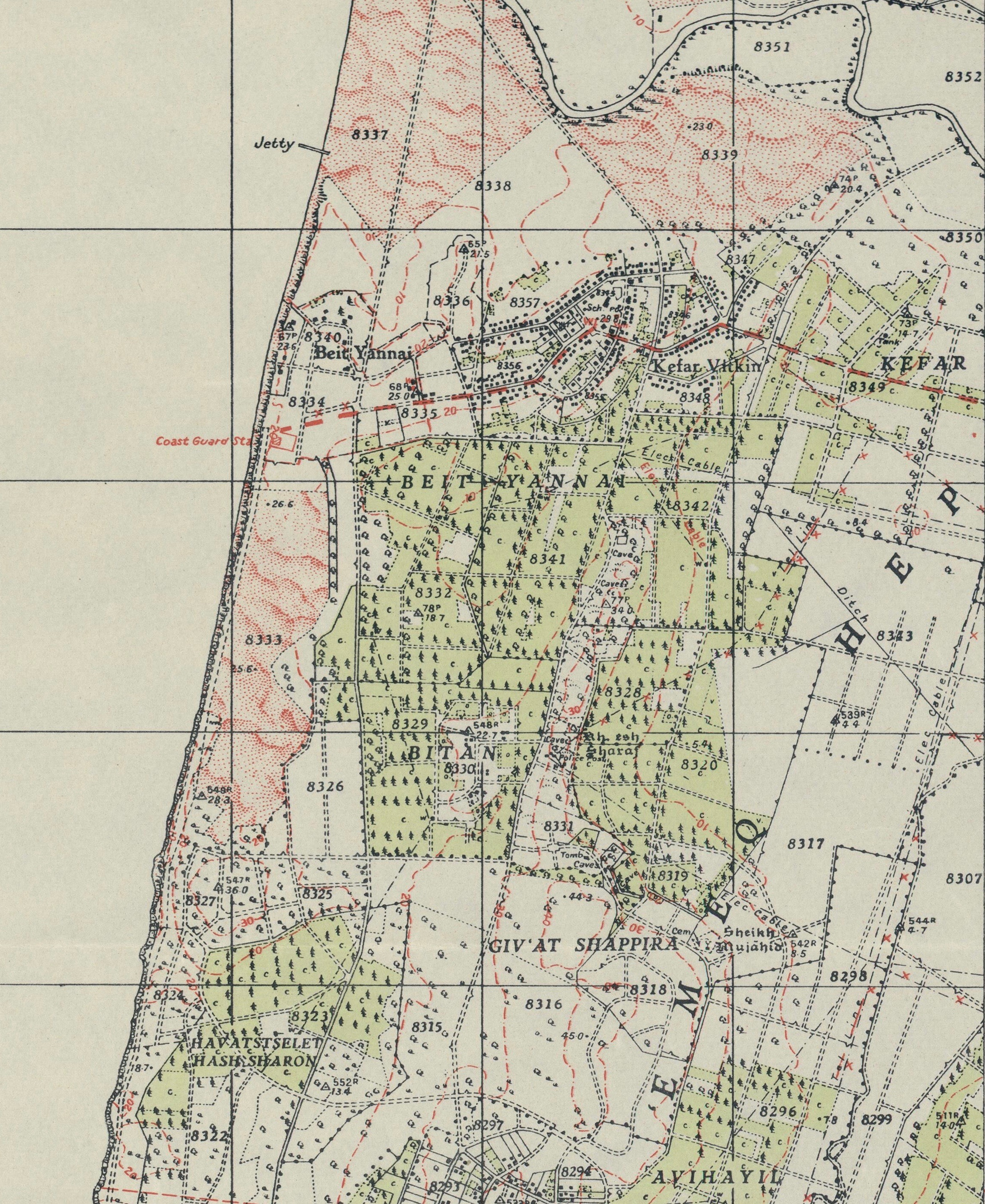
Kfar Vitkin in 1939, 1:20,000

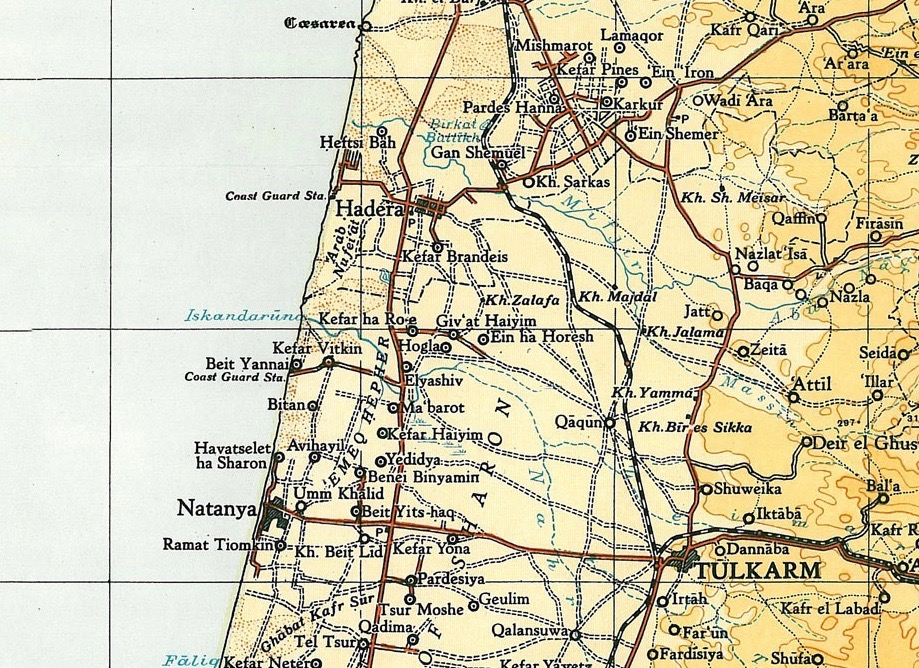
Kfar Vitkin in 1945, 1:250,000

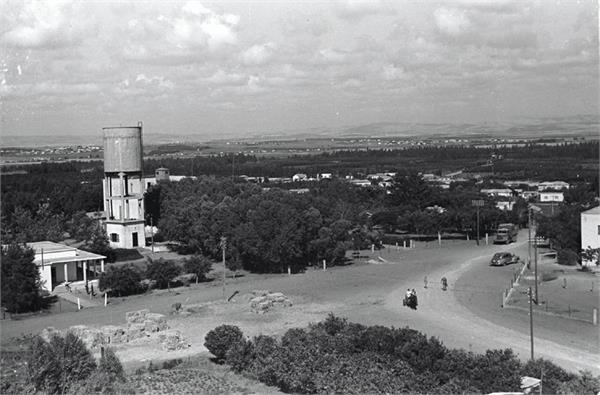
Kfar Vitkin in 1947

== Notable people ==
- Niv Adiri, Oscar winning sound engineer
