= Yosef Vitkin =

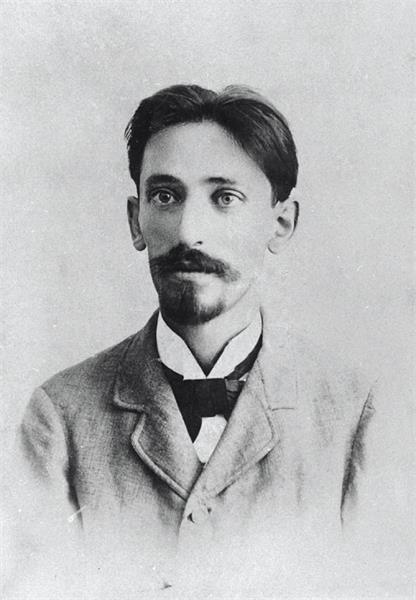
Vitkin in 1920

Yosef Vitkin (1876–1912) was a Zionist pioneer who is best known for his appeal for the Jewish aliyah (Jewish migration to Palestine) which contributed significantly to the success of the second aliyah, the immigration of Jews to the Land of Israel.

== Life ==
Vitkin was born in 1876 in Byelorussia (today Belarus) and moved to Ottoman Palestine in 1897 at the age of 21. At first he worked as a laborer but later, because he was well-educated, became a teacher. He worked as a teacher and headmaster in Gedera, Kfar Tabor and Rishon LeZion.

In March, 1905, he published his pamphlet (A Call to the Youth of Israel Whose Hearts are with Their People and Zion) which encouraged the young Jews of Eastern Europe to return to the Land of Israel and build the national home based on the principles of physical labor. It was written in Hebrew.

Vitkin was also among the founders and leaders of Hapoel Hatzair, the Young Workers Party, in 1905.

== Death and legacy ==
In 1907, he contracted throat cancer and went for medical treatment in Vienna. He died in Tel Aviv in 1912 at the age of 36.

Kfar Vitkin (lit. Vitkin Village) is a cooperative agricultural community founded in 1930.
