= Ala Kachuu – Take and Run =

2020 Swiss short film

- Promotional poster
- Directed by: Maria Brendle
- Written by: Maria Brendle
- Produced by: Nadine Lüchinger; Flavio Gerber; Mariana Méndez (executive producer)
- Cinematography: Gabriel Sandru
- Edited by: Luca Zuberbühler
- Music by: Martin Skalsky
- Production company: Filmgerberei
- Distributed by: Salaud Morisset
- Release date: August 2020
- Running time: 38 minutes
- Country: Switzerland
- Language: Kyrgyz

Ala Kachuu – Take and Run is a 2020 Swiss short film directed by Maria Brendle and produced by Nadine Lüchinger and Flavio Gerber, Filmgerberei. The film is about a Kyrgyz girl who falls victim to bride kidnapping (Kyrgyz: Ala Kachuu).

Ala Kachuu was shown at the Oscar qualifying festivals 11th BronzeLens Film Festival, 45th Cleveland International Film Festival, 16th HollyShorts Film Festival and the 38th Flickers’ Rhode Island Film Festival, and was later nominated for Best Live Action Short Film at the 94th Academy Awards.

== Plot ==
Sezim (Alina Turdumamatova) wants to fulfill her dream of studying in the Kyrgyz capital when she gets kidnapped by a group of young men and taken to the hinterland. There, she is forced to marry a stranger. If she refuses the marriage, she is threatened with social stigmatization and exclusion. Torn between her desire for freedom and the constraints of Kyrgyz culture, Sezim desperately seeks for a way out.

== Background ==
The 38-minute short film deals with bride kidnapping (Kyrgyz: Ala Kachuu), a form of forced marriage. The custom is heavily criticized, but is still widespread in Kyrgyz society. The film's title is based on the Kyrgyz term for bride kidnapping, which translates as "grab and run."

Maria Brendle motivation behind the short film was that the custom of bride kidnapping, despite its high incidence, is largely unknown outside the affected countries. She wants to use the short film to draw attention to the fate of the victims in order to bring more attention to them.

== Cast ==
- Alina Turdumamatova: Sezim
- Nurbek Esengazy Uulu: Dayrbek
- Madina Talipbekova: Aksana
- Aybike Erkinbekova: Aygul
- Jandat Djamanbaeva: Grandmother
- Taalaykan Abazova: Sezim's Mother
- Sheker Joomartova: Dayrbek's Mother

== Premiere ==
The short film had its world premiere at the 38th Rhode Island International Film Festival in August 2020 and was awarded the Marlyn Mason Award - First Prize for new voices and new perspectives by women in film at its premiere.

== Awards ==
Year	Presenter/Festival	Award/Category	Status
2021	Cleveland International Film Festival	Audience Choice Award for Best Short Film	Won
2021	Rhode Island International Film Festival	Best Short Film	Won
2021	Durban International Film Festival	Best Short Film	Won
2021	DC Shorts Film Festival	Audience Award	Won
2021	WorldFest-Houston International Film Festival	Platinum Remi	Won
2021	Newport Beach Film Festival	Narrative Short	Won
2022	Oscars	Academy Award for Best Live Action Short Film	Nominated
