= James Mather (sound editor) =

British sound editor

- Born: James H. Mather
- Occupation: Sound editor
- Years active: 1984–present

James H. Mather is a British sound editor. He won an Academy Award and was nominated for two more in the category Best Sound for the films Belfast, Top Gun: Maverick and Mission: Impossible – Dead Reckoning Part One.

== Selected filmography ==
- Belfast (2021; co-nominated with Denise Yarde, Simon Chase and Niv Adiri)
- Top Gun: Maverick (2022; co-won with Mark Weingarten, Al Nelson, Chris Burdon and Mark Taylor)
- Mission: Impossible – Dead Reckoning Part One (2023; co-nominated with Chris Munro, Chris Burdon and Mark Taylor)

== Awards and nominations ==
Major associations

Year	Award	Category	Nominated work	Result
2001	48th Golden Reel Awards	Best Sound Editing – Animated Feature	Chicken Run	Nominated
2003	50th Golden Reel Awards	Best Sound Editing – Television Animation – Sound	Legend of the Lost Tribe	Nominated
2005	52nd Golden Reel Awards	Best Sound Editing – Foreign Feature	King Arthur	Nominated
2005	52nd Golden Reel Awards	Best Sound Editing in Television Long Form – Sound Effects & Foley	The Life and Death of Peter Sellers	Nominated
2005	57th Primetime Creative Arts Emmy Awards	Outstanding Sound Editing for a Miniseries, Movie or a Special	The Life and Death of Peter Sellers	Won
2006	53rd Golden Reel Awards	Best Sound Editing in Animated Features	Wallace & Gromit: The Curse of the Were-Rabbit	Won
2008	55th Golden Reel Awards	Best Sound Editing – Sound Effects, Foley, Dialogue & ADR in a Foreign Feature Film	Harry Potter and the Order of the Phoenix	Nominated
2009	56th Golden Reel Awards	Best Sound Editing – Sound Effects, Foley, Dialogue & ADR in a Foreign Feature Film	The Chronicles of Narnia: Prince Caspian	Nominated
2010	57th Golden Reel Awards	Best Sound Editing – Sound Effects, Foley, Dialogue & ADR in a Foreign Feature Film	Harry Potter and the Half-Blood Prince	Nominated
2011	58th Golden Reel Awards	Best Sound Editing in Feature Film – Dialogue & ADR	Harry Potter and the Deathly Hallows – Part 1	Nominated
2012	65th British Academy Film Awards	Best Sound	Harry Potter and the Deathly Hallows – Part 2	Nominated
2019	72nd British Academy Film Awards	Best Sound	Mission: Impossible – Fallout	Nominated
2019	66th Golden Reel Awards	Outstanding Achievement in Sound Editing – Dialogue and ADR for Feature Film	Mission: Impossible – Fallout	Nominated
2019	66th Golden Reel Awards	Outstanding Achievement in Sound Editing – Sound Effects and Foley for Feature Film	Mission: Impossible – Fallout	Nominated
2022	69th Golden Reel Awards	Outstanding Achievement in Sound Editing – Sound Effects and Foley for Feature Film	Belfast	Nominated
2022	94th Academy Awards	Best Sound	Belfast	Nominated
2023	76th British Academy Film Awards	Best Sound	Top Gun: Maverick	Nominated
2023	70th Golden Reel Awards	Outstanding Achievement in Sound Editing – Feature Dialogue / ADR for Feature Film	Top Gun: Maverick	Nominated
2023	70th Golden Reel Awards	Outstanding Achievement in Sound Editing – Feature Effects / Foley for Feature Film	Top Gun: Maverick	Won
2023	95th Academy Awards	Best Sound	Top Gun: Maverick	Won
2024	96th Academy Awards	Best Sound	Mission: Impossible – Dead Reckoning Part One	Nominated
