= The Dress (2020 film) =

- Poster
- Polish: Sukienka
- Directed by: Tadeusz Łysiak
- Written by: Tadeusz Łysiak
- Produced by: Ewa Brzózka; Błażej Kafarski; Monika Ossowska; Maciej Ślesicki
- Starring: Anna Dzieduszycka; Dorota Pomykala; Szymon Piotr Warszawski; Lea Oleksiak
- Edited by: Mariusz Gos
- Music by: Jan Królikowski
- Production companies: Warsaw Film School; Dobro; Głośno; Polish Film Institute
- Distributed by: Salaud Morisset; The Animation Showcase
- Release date: June 2, 2020 (Kraków Film Festival)
- Running time: 30 minutes
- Country: Poland
- Language: Polish

The Dress (Polish: Sukienka) is a Polish graduation short drama film from the Warsaw Film School, written and directed by Tadeusz Łysiak. The film covers the topics of disability and intimacy, sexual assault and loneliness. It premiered at the Kraków Film Festival on June 2, 2020, and received a nomination for the Academy Award for Best Live Action Short Film at the 94th Academy Awards.

== Plot ==
Julia, a woman of short stature in her thirties, longs for love, intimacy and a relationship. After her work shift cleaning motel rooms, she sits in a local pub to play on slot machines, until she meets Bogdan. Before the dream date, however, Julia needs to buy a new dress.

== Cast ==
- Anna Dzieduszycka as Julka
- Dorota Pomykała as Renata
- Szymon Piotr Warszawski as Bogdan
- Lea Oleksiak as the Saleswoman

== Reception ==
The film covers the topics of disability and intimacy, sexual assault and loneliness. The film has been praised for his authentic disability representation still hard to find in the cinema industry.

== Accolades ==
The short film has been screened over 60 film festivals around the world, and awarded 17 times, including:

Year	Presenter/Festival	Award/Category	Status
2020	Moscow International Film Festival	Best Short Film	Nominated
2020	Camerimage	Student Etudes Competition	Nominated
2021	Atlanta Film Festival	Best Narrative Short	Won
2022	Academy Awards	Best Live Action Short Film	Nominated
