= Niv Adiri =

Israeli sound engineer

- ניב אדירי
- Born: Kfar Vitkin, Central District, Israel
- Occupation: Sound engineer
- Years active: 2004–present

Niv Adiri (Hebrew: ניב אדירי) is an Israeli sound engineer.

Adiri was born in Kfar Vitkin, Israel, He and his fellow sound engineers won the BAFTA Award for Best Sound, and have won an Academy Award for Best Sound Mixing for the 2013 film Gravity.

At the 94th Academy Awards, he was nominated for an Academy Award in the category Best Sound for the film Belfast. His nomination was shared with Denise Yarde, Simon Chase and James Mather.
