= Ojciec królowej =

1979 film by Wojciech Solarz

Ojciec królowej is a Polish historical film directed by Wojciech Solarz. It was released in 1979.
