= Simon Chase =

British sound editor

- Occupation: Sound editor

Simon Chase is a British sound editor. He was nominated for an Academy Award in the category Best Sound for the film Belfast.

== Selected filmography ==
- Belfast (2021; co-nominated with Denise Yarde, James Mather and Niv Adiri)
