= Maria Brendle =

German-Swiss film director

- Born: October 3, 1983 (age 42); Germany
- Education: Drehbuchwerkstatt Munich
- Occupations: Director, scriptwriter
- Years active: 2013-present
- Known for: Oscar Nominated Ala Kachuu – Take and Run Best Live Action Short Film
- Awards: Best Female Director at the Bridges International Film Festival

Maria Brendle (born October 3, 1983) is a German-Swiss film director and screenwriter based in Zurich. In 2020, she wrote and directed the film Ala Kachuu – Take and Run for which she received a nomination for the Best Live Action Short Film at the 94th Academy Awards. Her debut feature film, Frida's Fall, premiered at the 20th Zurich Film Festival.

== Career ==
Maria Brendle began her career with journalistic activities for various TV stations and worked for several advertising agencies.

From 2008 to 2013 she studied BA Film at the Zurich University of the Arts. Her graduation film “Blinder Passagier” (“The Stowaway”) won numerous awards, including Best Script Writer at the Shanghai International Film Festival and Best Live Action Short at the Chicago International Children's Film Festival, which was qualifying for the 2015 Academy Awards in the category "Best Live Action Short Film".

Maria Brendle is a graduate of the 27th Drehbuchwerkstatt München (2015/2016), where she wrote her first feature film script. She received her Master in cognitive neuroscience (aon) from the Academy of Neuroscience Cologne in 2020.

In August 2020, her short film Ala Kachuu – Take and Run had its world premiere at the 38th Rhode Island International Film Festival and was awarded the "Marlyn Mason Award - First Prize for new voices and new perspectives by women in film". The award winning 38-minute short film tells the story of a Kyrgyz girl who becomes a victim of bride kidnapping and is Maria Brendle's second film to be in consideration for the Academy Awards.

== Filmography ==
A selection
Year	Title	Category	Role
2009	Singen im Herbst	Short documentary	Director
2010	Meeresfrüchtchen	Short film	Director & writer
2011	Neid	Short film	Director
2012	Schwarze Trauer, Rote Lippen	Short film	Director & writer
2013	Special Guest	Short film	Co-director & co-writer
2013	Blinder Passagier	Short film	Director & writer
2016	Bombastic	Short film	Director
2019	Schaumbildung	Short film	Director
2020	Ala Kachuu – Take and Run	Short film	Director & writer
2024	Friedas Fall	Feature Film	Director & Co-writer

== Awards ==
A Selection
Year	Category	Festival	Work
2014	Best Scriptwriter	Shanghai International Film Festival	Blinder Passagier (The Stowaway)
2014	Best Live Action Short	Chicago International Children's Film Festival	Blinder Passagier (The Stowaway)
2020	Marlyn Mason Award - First Prize	Rhode Island International Film Festival	Ala Kachuu – Take and Run
2020	Best Live Action Narrative Short	Pittsburgh Shorts	Ala Kachuu – Take and Run
2021	Audience Choice Award- Best Short Film	Cleveland International Film Festival	Ala Kachuu – Take and Run
2021	Best Short Film	Durban International Film Festival	Ala Kachuu – Take and Run
2021	Short Plus Award	Fünf Seen Film Festival	Ala Kachuu – Take and Run
2021	Audience Award - Best Short Film	Naples International Film Festival	Ala Kachuu – Take and Run
2021	Best Direction	Vancouver International Women in Film Festival	Ala Kachuu – Take and Run
2021	Audience Award	DC Shorts Film Festival	Ala Kachuu – Take and Run
2021	Jury Award - Best Narrative Short	Newport Beach Film Festival	Ala Kachuu – Take and Run
