= Denise Yarde =

British sound engineer

- Occupation: Sound engineer

Denise Yarde is a British sound engineer. She was nominated for an Academy Award in the category Best Sound for the film Belfast.

== Selected filmography ==
- Belfast (2021; co-nominated with Simon Chase, James Mather and Niv Adiri)
