= Lovell (surname) =

Lovell is an English surname. Notable people with the surname include:

- Adam Lovell (born 1977), American founder of WriteAPrisoner.com
- Alan Lovell (born 1953), British businessman
- Alex Lovell (born 1973), British television presenter
- Andy Lovell (born 1970), Australian football player
- Ann Lovell (c. 1811–1869), wife of James Lovell; first European settlers in Golden Bay, New Zealand
- Avon Lovell (born 1945), Australian investigative journalist
- Bernard Lovell (1913–2012), British radio astronomer
- Charles Lovell (disambiguation), several people, including
  - Charles C. Lovell (1929–2023), United States federal judge
  - Charles Henry Lovell (1854–1916), farmer, lumber merchant and political figure in Quebec
  - Charles Lovell (trade unionist) (1923–2014), British trade union leader
- Christopher Lovell (born 1967), English cricketer
- Curtis Lovell II (born 1981), American illusionist and escape artist
- Cyrus Lovell (1804–1895), American politician
- Daniel Lovell (died 1818), English journalist
- David Lovell (born 1969), Australian born Welsh cricketer
- David Lovell (Bermudian cricketer) (born 1983)
- Dyson Lovell (1936–2024), British film producer and actor
- Ellen McCulloch-Lovell, American academic administrator, college president and presidential advisor
- Francis Lovell, 1st Viscount Lovell (1456–c. 1487), supporter of Richard III in the Wars of the Roses
- Frank Lovell (1913–1998), American communist politician
- Frederick S. Lovell (1813–1878), American politician and military officer
- Fulke Lovell (died 1285), Bishop of London-elect (1280), Archdeacon of Colchester (1263–1267)
- Fulton Lovell (1913–1980), American politician and commissioner in Georgia
- George William Lovell (1804–1878), English dramatist
- Glenville Lovell (born 1955), Barbadian writer
- Guillermo Lovell (1918–1967), Argentine boxer
- Harold Lovell (born 1955), government minister in Antigua and Barbuda
- Henry Lovell (1828–1907), Canadian politician
- Henry Tasman Lovell (1878–1958), Australian psychologist
- Jacqueline Lovell (born 1974), American actress
- James Lovell (disambiguation), several people, including
  - James Lovell (Continental Congress) (1736–1814), Continental Congress delegate from Massachusetts
  - James Lovell (sculptor) (died 1778), English sculptor
- Jean Lovell (1926–1992), American female baseball player
- Jenifer Lovell (born 1974), American rhythmic gymnast
- Jenny Lovell, Australian actress
- Jessamyn Lovell (born 1977), American visual artist
- Jim Lovell (1928–2025), U.S. astronaut of Apollo 8, Gemini 12 and commander of Apollo 13
- Jim Lovell (British Army soldier) (1899–2004), the last surviving decorated 'Tommy' of the First World War
- Jocelyn Lovell (1950–2016), Canadian cyclist
- John Lovell (disambiguation), several people, including
  - John Lovell (grocer) (c. 1851–1913), businessman in Los Angeles, California
  - John C. Lovell (born 1967), American sailor
  - John Harvey Lovell (1860–1939), entomologist in Maine
- Joseph Lovell (1788–1836), Surgeon General of the United States Army
- Julia Lovell (born 1975), British sinologist
- Karl Lovell (born 1977), Australian rugby player
- Kevin Lovell (born 1984), American football placekicker
- Kieran Lovell (born 1997), Australian rules footballer
- Lawrence Lovell (born 1944), British hockey player
- Leo Lovell (1907–1976), Swazi and South African politician
- Liliana Lovell (born 1967), American entrepreneur, founder of the Coyote Ugly Saloon
- Mansfield Lovell (1822–1884), major general in the Confederate States Army
- Marc Lovell (born 1982), English hockey player
- Margaretta M. Lovell, American professor of art history
- Maria Ann Lovell, née Lacy (1803–1877), English actress and playwright
- Mary Frances Lovell (1843–1932), British-born American writer, humanitarian, and temperance reformer
- Mary S. Lovell (born 1941), British writer
- Mark Lovell (rally driver) (1960–2003), British rally driver
- Mark Lovell (footballer) (born 1983), English footballer
- Matt Lovell, Australian record producer
- Michael Lovell (1967–2024), American engineer, and President of Marquette University
- Michael C. Lovell (1930–2018), American economist
- Moodie Brock Lovell (1853–1902), Canadian politician
- Nigel Lovell (1916–2001), Australian stage and radio actor and producer
- Night Lovell (Shermar Paul; born 1997), Canadian rapper and record producer
- Noel Lovell (born 1961), Australian rules footballer
- Patricia Lovell (1929–2013), Australian film producer
- Patsy Lovell (1954–2024), English cricketer
- Pedro Lovell (born 1945), Argentine boxer
- Rachel Lovell (born 1978), Australian kayak racer
- Rata Lovell-Smith (née Bird; 1894–1969), New Zealand artist
- Raymond Lovell (1900–1953), Canadian-British film actor
- Robert Lovell (1771–1796), English poet
- Salathiel Lovell (died 1713), British judge
- Santiago Lovell (1912–1966), Argentine boxer
- Sarah Lovell (born 1980), Australian politician
- Sidney Lovell (1867–1938), American architect
- Simon Lovell (born 1957), British comedy magician and card magician
- Simone Lovell (born 1934), British actress
- Solomon Lovell (1732–1801), militia brigadier general during the American Revolutionary War
- Steve Lovell (born 1980), English soccer player
- Steve Lovell (Welsh footballer) (born 1960)
- Stuart Lovell (born 1972), Australian professional footballer
- Sue Lovell (born 1950), American politician
- Tiffany Roberts-Lovell, American politician
- Tim Lovell (born 2002), American ice hockey player
- Thomas Lovell (died 1524), English soldier and administrator
- Thomas Lovell (died 1567), English politician
- Tom Lovell (1909–1997), American illustrator and painter
- Tony Lovell (1919–1945), British military pilot
- Tyler Lovell (born 1987), Australian field hockey player
- Vella Lovell (born 1985), American actress
- Walter Lovell (1884–1937), American military pilot
- Wendy Lovell (born 1959), Australian politician
- Whitfield Lovell (born 1959), American artist
- Will Lovell (born 1993), English rugby player
- The Lovell family, Lairds of Ballumbie
- Robin Lovell-Badge (born 1953), British geneticist
- Peter Lovell-Davis, Baron Lovell-Davis (1924–2001), British publishing executive and politician
- William Lovell-Hewitt (1901–1984), English cricketer
- Kitty Lovell-Smith (Hilda Kate Lovell-Smith; 1886–1973), New Zealand businesswoman and community organiser

== See also ==
- William Lovell, 1795–1796 novel by Ludwig Tieck
