= Fişek =

Fişek is a Turkish surname. Notable people with the surname include:

- Hayrullah Fişek (1885–1975), Turkish career officer
- Hicri Fişek (1918–2002), Turkish politician
- Nusret Fişek (1914–1990), Turkish government minister
- Şadan Fişek (1922–2002), Turkish politician
