= List of Légion d'honneur recipients by name (F) =

The French government gives out the Legion of Honour awards, to both French and foreign nationals, based on a recipient's exemplary services rendered to France, or to the causes supported by France. This award is divided into five distinct categories (in ascending order), i.e. three ranks: Knight, Officer, Commander, and two titles: Grand Officer and Grand Cross. Knight is the most common and is awarded for either at least 20 years of public service or acts of military or civil bravery. The rest of the categories have a quota for the number of years of service in the category below before they can be awarded. The Officer rank requires a minimum of eight years as a Knight, and the Commander, the highest civilian category for a non-French citizen, requires a minimum of five years as an Officer. The Grand Officer and the Grand Cross are awarded only to French citizens, and each requires three years' service in their respective immediately lower rank. The awards are traditionally published and promoted on 14 July.

The following is a non-exhaustive list of recipients of the Legion of Honour awards, since the first ceremony in May 1803. 2,550 individuals can be awarded the insignia every year. The total number of awards is close to 1 million (estimated at 900,000 in 2021, including over 3,000 Grand Cross recipients), with some 92,000 recipients alive today. Only until 2008 was gender parity achieved amongst the yearly list of recipients, with the total number of women recipients since the award's establishment being only 59 at the end of the second French empire and only 26,000 in 2021.

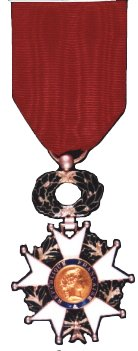

Recipient	Dates (birth – death)	General work & reason for the recognition	Award category (date)
Douglas Fairbanks, Jr.			
Fairuz	1935 – Present		
František Fajtl			
Pierre Farah, Pr.		Surgeon, Member of the French Academy of Medicine	
Henry Farman			
Horace Farquhar, 1st Earl Farquhar			
Charles S. Farnsworth			
Faucher de Saint-Maurice			
William Fawcett	1894 – 1974		
Nabil Fekir		World Cup winning footballer	
Logan Feland			
Samuel Morse Felton Jr.	1853 – 1930		
Carlo Feraud de Villy			
Frank Ferrington	1923 – 2006		
Henri Fertet	1926 – 1943	French Resistance fighter	
Francis Worgan Festing			
David Feuerwerker			
Mustafa Fevzi Çakmak			
Art Fiala			
Benjamin Eugene Fichel		Artist	TBA (1870)
Eugen Filotti			
Carlos Finlay	1833 – 1915		
Alfred Finnigan			
Hicri Fişek			
Hicri Fişek	1918 – 2002		
Şadan Fişek	1922 – 2002		
Eugène Fiset			
Hamilton Fish III			
Stanislas Flache	1919 – Present		
Gustave Flaubert			
Gordon Van de Meer Fleming	1921 – Present		
Renée Fleming			
Robert John Fleming			
Joel Lafayette Fletcher, Jr.	1897 – 1972		
Maurice Floquet			
Brian Flowers, Baron Flowers			
Ferdinand Foch			
René Fonck			
Just Fontaine			
George Forbes (scientist)			
Glenn Ford			
Léonard-Léopold Forgemol de Bostquénard			
Laurent Fortin	1967 – Present		
Victor Fortune			
Tsuguharu Foujita		Japanese painter, who became a French national	
Georges Fournier			
Jacques Fournier	1924 – Present	French industrialist and president of Dumez	
Maximilien Sebastien Foy			
Abraham Foxman			
Français of Nantes			
Auguste Franchomme			
Denis Francoise Boulanger	1796 – 1849		
Aleksander Fredro			
Paul L. Freeman, Jr.			
Mirella Freni			
Inès de La Fressange, Roger Vivier		Representative and first model to receive the medal	
Frederick Carl Frieseke			
Varian Fry	1907 – 1967	Operated a refugee network from Marseille; helped over 2,000 people escape the Holocaust in 1940-41.	1967. Chevalier.

== See also ==
- Legion of Honour
- List of Legion of Honour recipients by name
- List of foreign recipients of Legion of Honour by name
- List of foreign recipients of the Legion of Honour by country
- List of British recipients of the Legion of Honour for the Crimean War
- Legion of Honour Museum
- Ribbons of the French military and civil awards
- War Cross (France)
