= James Lovell (disambiguation) =

Jim Lovell (1928–2025) was an American astronaut of Apollo 8 and commander of Apollo 13.

James or Jim Lovell may also refer to:

- James Lovell (politician) (1736–1814), American politician, Continental Congress delegate from Massachusetts
- James Lovell (sculptor) (died 1778), English sculptor
- Jim Lovell (British Army soldier) (1899–2004), British Army soldier, last surviving decorated 'Tommy' of the First World War
- Jim Lovell (politician) (born 1950), American politician, member of the Kentucky House of Representatives

== See also ==
- Jim Leavelle (1920–2019), Dallas Police Department homicide detective
