= Kuentz =

Kuentz is a German surname that may refer to

- Charles Kuentz (Egyptologist) (1895–1978), American–born French Egyptologist
- Charles Kuentz (soldier) (1897–2005), Alsatian centenarian and veteran of World War I
- Paul Kuentz (1930–?), French conductor
