= General Lovell =

General Lovell may refer to:

- Joseph Lovell (1788–1836), U.S. Army Surgeon General
- Mansfield Lovell (1822–1884), Confederate States Army major general
- Solomon Lovell (1732–1801), Massachusetts Bay Militia brigadier general in the American Revolutionary War
