= Charles Kuentz =

Charles Kuentz may refer to:

- Charles Kuentz (Egyptologist) (1895–1978), American–born French Egyptologist
- Charles Kuentz (soldier) (1897–2005), Alsatian centenarian and veteran of World War I
