= John Lovell =

John Lovell may refer to:

- John Lovell (grocer) (c. 1851–1913), businessman in Los Angeles, California
- John C. Lovell (born 1967), American sailor
- John Harvey Lovell (1860–1939), entomologist in Maine

== See also ==
- Lovell (surname)
