= Lovell General Hospital (Rhode Island) =

Former hospital in Rhode Island, United States

Coordinates: 41.5892°N 71.2861°W

Lovell General Hospital was a United States Army hospital in Portsmouth, Rhode Island which was active during the American Civil War from 1862 to 1865. It was named after Joseph Lovell, who served as the U.S. Army's surgeon general from 1818 to 1836. (Ironically, during the time Lovell General Hospital was active, Lovell's son, Mansfield Lovell, was serving as a major general in the Confederate States Army.)

== History ==
On May 19, 1862, the surgeon general of the U.S. Army authorized Governor of Rhode Island William Sprague IV to "provide suitable accommodations for wounded and sick soldiers". Sprague appointed a commission which selected Portsmouth Grove in the Melville section of the town of Portsmouth as the location for the hospital.

The first patients arrived on July 6, 1862. Over the course of the war thousands patients were cared for by the hospital.

As a number of patients at the hospital were Union soldiers convicted by court martial and others were Confederate prisoners of war, it was necessary to have guards posted at the hospital. In the early months of the hospital's operation security was provided by units of the Rhode Island Militia - first by the Artillery Company of Newport and later by the First Light Infantry of Providence. In December 1862 a company of volunteers, called the Hospital Guards, was raised under the command of Captain Christopher Blanding. Soldiers who joined the company had to have disabilities or injuries which precluded them from front line service. The company remained at the hospital until it was closed and was mustered out of service on August 25, 1865.

An early superintendent of the hospital was Katherine Prescott Wormeley who was a key organizer of the United States Sanitary Commission. Wormeley was inspired by the work of Florence Nightingale during the Crimean War and was highly successful in recruiting nurses to work at the hospital.

The hospital was named Lovell General Hospital after Joseph Lovell, who served as the Surgeon General of the United States Army from 1818 to 1836. The hospital was also known as Portsmouth Grove Hospital.

The hospital was closed on August 25, 1865. In time, all the buildings of the hospital were either dismantled or removed. There are no remains of the hospital.

During the course of the war, over 200 patients died at the hospital. Their remains were originally buried in a cemetery near the hospital but were removed to Cypress Hills National Cemetery in Brooklyn, New York in May 1868.

== Later use of site ==
In the early 20th Century the hospital site became a coaling station for the Navy. Prior to World War II the Navy converted from coal to oil and the coaling station was converted accordingly.

The site of the hospital became a PT boat training base during World War II. John F. Kennedy was one of the hundreds of Navy officers to receive training there.

After the Navy greatly reduced its presence in Rhode Island in the 1970s, the site was converted for use by the boating industry. Major commercial enterprises there include Hinckley Yacht Services, Little Harbor Marine, the Bend Boat Basin and the Melville Grille restaurant. Several former America's Cup yachts are stored there during the winter.
