= Sabri Kalkandelen =

Ottoman poet

Sabri Kalkandelen (1862 – 8 April 1943) was a poet and chief of the Istanbul Imperial Library.

Sabri Kalkandelen was born in Kalkandelen, Ottoman Empire, the son of Mustafa Ruhi Efendi and Saide Hanko and had three sisters: Zehra, Hürrem, and Fatma Hanko, the mother of General Hayrullah Fişek. Kalkandelen married Saime and had two children. He died in Istanbul, Turkey.
