= The Last Tommy (TV series) =

Three-episode documentary series about British veterans of the First World War

The Last Tommy is a three episode documentary series about some of Britain's last veterans of the First World War. It was produced by Quickfire Media, narrated by Bernard Hill and commissioned by the BBC. The main theme from Schindler's List was used as the series' background score.

== Production ==
When filming began in 2003, only 27 British veterans of the First World War were known to be still alive, 12 of whom were featured in the series, along with German veteran Charles Kuentz. Those interviewed were: Harry Patch, Claude Choules, Bill Stone, Alfred Anderson, Sandy Young, Alfred Finnigan, Arthur Halestrap, Jim Lovell, Arthur Barraclough, Charles Watson, Percy Wilson and Jonas Hart. Fred Lloyd and John Ross were also interviewed by Quickfire Media about their wartime experiences, but were not featured in any of the series' episodes.

In addition to interviews with the veterans, the series also contained footage of Arthur Halestrap's 2003 visit to the Western Front, and Harry Patch's visit the following year, along with his meeting with Charles Kuentz. The reenactments of various veterans' stories, were filmed in East Anglia and Suffolk. Each episode is an hour long, with the first two focusing primarily on the wartime memories of the veterans, whilst the third one covers their post-war life, including their memories of the Second World War.

== Broadcast ==
The first two episodes were broadcast on BBC One in November 2005, and were watched by approximately 3.9 million people. Sam Wollaston, a TV critic for the Guardian said of the series: "It was impossible not to be moved by The Last Tommy (BBC1), in spite of some cheapening and unnecessary reconstruction. Wonderful old men, the embers of a generation - like Harry Patch and Alfred Anderson, who was there for the famous Christmas ceasefire of 1914 - remember the fear, horror, the buddies who never came home, the biscuits and the bully beef. But also they remember the cameraderie [sic] and the songs. The whole thing reminded me of watching a beautiful sunset over the sea. You don't want to look away in case, when you look back, it's gone."

In the first week after transmission, Harry Patch received 180 letters from the public, much of which was fan mail, and later re-established contact with a niece of his first wife, whom he had not seen for over 30 years, as she had been unaware that he was still alive until she saw the programme. The final episode was broadcast in August 2009, several weeks after Patch's death.
