= Mustafa Ruhi Efendi =

Religious and political leader

Haxhi Mustafa Ruhi Efendi
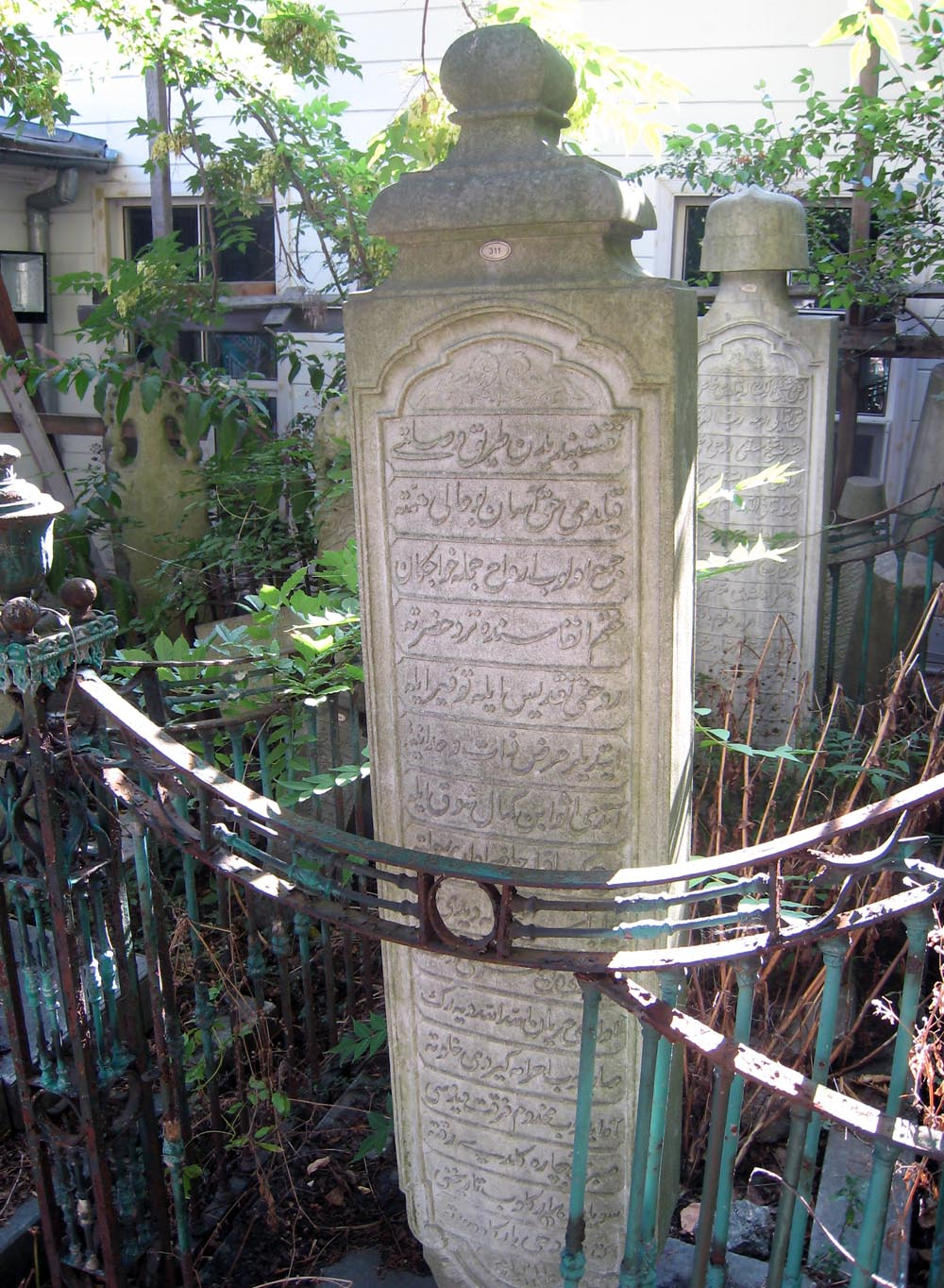
- Mustafa Ruhi Efendi tombstone

Religious and Political Leader

Personal details
- Born: 1800 Imbros (present-day Gökçeada), Ottoman Empire
- Died: 1893 (aged 93) Istanbul, Ottoman Empire (present-day Turkey)
- Children: Sabri Kalkandelen (poet, chief of the Istanbul Imperial Library); Fatma Hanko (mother of General Hayrullah Fişek); Hurrem; Zehra

Mustafa Ruhi Efendi (1800–1893, Istanbul, Ottoman Empire) was a shaikh of the Naqshbandi tariqah and political leader in the Balkans during the Ottoman period. Born in an Albanian family on the Aegean island Imbros (present-day Gökçeada in Turkey), he moved as a young man at the Vilayet of Kosovo to his family's ancestral hometown in the city of Kalkandelen (present-day Tetovo in North Macedonia). He was one of the participants of the League of Prizren which established the basis of Albanian nationalism, and was elected "President of the Central Committee of the League". He was buried in the courtyard of the Yahya Efendi mausoleum in the Yıldız Palace park in Istanbul.
