= Jeanne Arcache =

Alexandria-born Lebanese writer

Jeanne Arcache (Arabic: جان اركاش, 1902–1961) is a pioneer Lebanese Francophone poet, novelist, and journalist, who wrote for French-language periodicals in Egypt.

== Biography ==
Arcache was born in 1902 in Alexandria to a Lebanese father and a French mother. She attended the Lycée Française in her native city and pursued an education in literature and music. Arcache wrote for several journals in Egypt, most notably the weekly Image, La Semaine Egyptienne, and the monthly La Revue du Caire. She was a member of La société des auteurs libanais de langue française (The Society of French-speaking Lebanese Authors) which included leading authors such as Michel Chiha, Michel Talhamé, Georges Schéhadé, Emile Cousa, Alfred Naccache, Eveline Bustros, and Blanche Amoun; all Christian Lebanese nationalists.

Arcache's literary career was influenced by Alexandria-based Lady Weissenborn, a German author and painter, and the Swiss poet Jacques-René Fiechter, a university professor and director of the Swiss School of Alexandria de (Ecole suisse d'Alexandrie). Arcache was a pentalingual cosmopolite; she traveled extensively in Europe, and visited France, Italy, the Netherlands, and Germany.

In 1945, she married Charles Kuentz, who headed the Institut Français d'Archéologie Orientale. She died in France in 1961.

== Published works ==
- L'Egypte dans mon miroir (poetry -1931)
- La chambre haute (poetry - 1933)
- L'Emir à la croix (novel - 1938)
- Les chêvres d'Abou Soliman (novel - 1953)
