= World War 1 in Colour =

2003 British documentary TV series

- Genre: Educational
- Based on: World War I
- Directed by: Jonathan Martin
- Narrated by: Kenneth Branagh
- Country of origin: United Kingdom
- Original language: English
- No. of seasons: 1
- No. of episodes: 6

Production
- Executive producer: Philip Nugus
- Producer: Jonathan Martin
- Production location: United Kingdom
- Running time: Approximately 312 minutes
- Production company: Nugus/Martin Productions Ltd.

Original release
- Release: 23 July – 27 August 2003

World War 1 in Colour is a six-episode television documentary series recounting the major events of World War I narrated by Kenneth Branagh. The first of its six parts aired on 23 July 2003. The series consists of colourised footage, with the colour of the images having been enhanced by computer-aided technology. It reportedly took 400 technicians over a period of five months to colourise the footage.

The series investigates the development of warfare throughout the five years of World War 1 from all sides of the armed forces and also includes never before seen interviews from survivors of the Great War. In 2005, the series was released on DVD in the United States. The DVD is presented as two discs, with three episodes apiece on the two discs.

== Features ==
The series features interviews with a number of World War I veterans:

- Arthur Barraclough (1898–2004)
- Harry Patch (1898–2009), Britain's last survivor of the trenches
- Fred Bunday (1900–2002)
- Arthur Halestrap (1898–2004)
- Hubert Williams (1896–2002), the last pilot of the Royal Flying Corps of WWI
- Bill Stone (1900–2009), the penultimate Royal Navy veteran of WWI
- Jack Davis (1895–2003), the last of Kitchener's Volunteers

== Episodes ==
No.	Title	Original release date
1	"Catastrophe"	23 July 2003
Outbreak of World War 1
2	"Slaughter in the Trenches"	30 July 2003
Combat on the Western Front
3	"Blood in the Air"	6 August 2003
Conflict in the air
4	"Killers of the Sea"	13 August 2003
Conflict on the seas
5	"Mayhem on the Eastern Front"	20 August 2003
Combat on the Eastern Front
6	"Victory and Despair"	27 August 2003
End of World War 1

=== DVD extras ===
- 50 minute CGI special Tactics & Strategy
- 15 minutes of interviews with the production team (Making the Series)

== See also ==
- World War II in Colour
