= Arthur Halestrap =

British Army officer (1898–2004)

Arthur Halestrap MBE
- Born: 8 September 1898; Southampton, Hampshire
- Died: 1 April 2004 (aged 105); Kings Sutton, Northamptonshire
- Military career
- Allegiance: United Kingdom
- Branch: Royal Engineers
- Service years: 1916–1918
- Awards: Légion d'honneur

Arthur Halestrap MBE (8 September 1898 – 1 April 2004) was one of the last surviving British soldiers of World War I.

He was born in Southampton, Hampshire. In his youth he walked the decks of the Titanic before she sailed. He tried to enlist in the British armed forces shortly after the outbreak of the First World War in 1914. His request was refused on account of his youth. However, in September 1916, he joined the Royal Engineers Signal Division and was sent to France in January 1918. After the First World War, Halestrap was employed by Marconi and worked with Cyril Evans, who had been the Californian's wireless operator on the night of the Titanic disaster. At this time he was living in Black Notley in Essex with his wife Gladys Gwendoline.

In the Second World War, he was commissioned into the Royal Corps of Signals and, in 1942, was seconded to the Special Operations Executive. He lost his only son during the war. Flying Officer (Navigator) John Philip Halestrap died on 4 March 1945, aged twenty, while serving with the 68 Sqdn. Royal Air Force Volunteer Reserve. He was buried at Ipswich Crematorium in Suffolk. After the war, Arthur worked at first as a member of the Allied Control Commission in Germany, then as a member of the Diplomatic Wireless Service. He retired in 1970.

In 1963, Halestrap was appointed as a Member of The Order of the British Empire. He was awarded the French Légion d'honneur in 1988.

He continued to appear on television documentaries into his extremely old age. In 2003, aged 105, he was the only British veteran of the First World War to attend the Armistice Day Ceremony in Ypres, where he rose from his wheelchair and, in a clear and strong voice, recited Laurence Binyon's poem "For the Fallen". Along with Harry Patch and a few others, he was featured in the 2003 television series World War 1 in Colour as well as The Last Tommy on BBC 1 in 2005.

Arthur Halestrap died in Kings Sutton, Northamptonshire, where he had moved to in the 1960s.
