= Charles Lovell =

Charles Lovell may refer to:

- Bernard Lovell (Charles Bernard Lovell, 1913–2012), English physicist
- Charles C. Lovell (1929–2023), United States federal judge
- Charles Henry Lovell (1854–1916), farmer, lumber merchant and political figure in Quebec
- Charles Lovell (trade unionist) (1923–2014), British trade union leader
- Charles S. Lovell (1811–1871), American military officer
- Chuck Lovell (born c. 1973), chief of the Portland, Oregon Police Bureau
