= David Lovell (Bermudian cricketer) =

Bermudian cricketer (born 1983)

Personal information
- Born: 24 September 1983 (age 43); Bermuda
- Batting: Right-handed
- Bowling: Right-arm medium-fast

International information
- National side: Bermuda

Career statistics
Competition	First-class
Matches	1
Runs scored	19
Batting average	9.50
100s/50s	–/–
Top score	17
Balls bowled	24
Wickets	–
Bowling average	–
5 wickets in innings	–
10 wickets in match	–
Best bowling	–
Catches/stumpings	–/–
- Source: Cricinfo, 1 April 2013

David Lovell (born 24 September 1983) is a Bermudian cricketer. Lovell is a right-handed batsman who bowls right-arm medium-fast.

Lovell made a single first-class appearance for Bermuda in 2009 in the Intercontinental Shield against Uganda at the National Stadium, Hamilton. Bermuda won the toss and elected to bat first, making 91 all out in their first-innings, with Lovell being dismissed for 2 runs by Frank Nsubuga. In response, Uganda made 119 all out in their first-innings, with bowling four wicketless overs. Bermuda then made 138 all out in their second-innings, with Lovell scoring 17 runs from 42 balls before he was dismissed by Charles Waiswa. Uganda won the match by seven wickets. This remains his only major appearance for Bermuda.
