= Nusret Fişek =

Turkish physician

Nusret H. Fişek
- Born: November 21, 1914; Sivas, Turkey
- Died: November 3, 1990 (aged 75); Ankara, Turkey
- Resting place: Cebeci Adri Cemetery, Ankara
- Education: Istanbul University; Harvard University
- Occupations: Academic, civil servant
- Spouse: Perihan Rukiye Fişek (m. 1940, d. 2007)
- Children: 2 sons: Kurthan Fişek (1942-2012), A. Gürhan Fişek (1951-2017)
- Parent(s): Hayrullah Fişek, Mukaddes Fişek
- Relatives: Brother: Hicri Fişek
- Website: nusret.fisek.org.tr

Hasan Nusret Fişek (21 November 1914 in Sivas, Ottoman Empire - 3 November 1990 in Ankara, Turkey) was a Turkish physician and Minister of Health.

== Early years ==
Nusret Hasan Fişek was born in Sivas to Hayrullah Fişek, a commander at the Turkish War of Independence, and Mukaddes on November 21, 1914. He had a brother, A. Hicri Fişek. He was registered in Istanbul.

After finishing Kabataş High School in 1932, he studied Medicin at Istanbul University. In 1938, he graduated with honors. He began his specialization study in Bacteriology at the same university. In 1946, he became a specialist in Biomedicine and Food chemistry (Biochemistry). Fişek obtained a Doctor of Medicine title from Harvard University in 1952.

Nusret Fişek married Perihan Rukiye in 1940 (died 2007), who gave birth to two sons, Kurthan (1942-2012), and A. Gürhan (1951-2017).

== Professional career ==
In 1955, Fişek became assistant professor for Biochemistry. He was promoted to full professor of Public Health in 1966. He gained international success for his scientific works on tetanus toxoid. He established biochemistry labs and contributed to their improvement.

In 1960, still head of the Public Health School, he was appointed undersecretary at the Ministry of Health, and served at this position until 1965. During this time period, he acted also as the minister's placeholder for a while. In 1963, Fişek took the post of the head of the newly established Institute of Community Medicine at Hacettepe University in Ankara.

From 1983 on, Fişek served six years long as the chairman of the Union of Turkish Physicians.

He was member of many professional organizations at domestic and international level. He is the author of a number of scientific publications also in foreign languages.

== Death ==
Nusret Hasan Fişek died in Ankara on November 3, 1990. He was laid to rest at the Cebeci Asri Cemetery in Ankara.

== Honors ==
- 150th Anniversary Award by Michigan University for his works on Demography,
- Fellow of the Royal College of Physicians (FRCP) for his works on Socialiaztion of Health.
- TUBİTAK Bilim ve Hizmet Ödülü (1993) by Scientific and Technological Research Council of Turkey for his works on Demography and Socialization of Health.

== Legacy ==
=== Awards Named After Him ===
- The Chamber of Physicians in Istanbul established the "Prof. Dr. Nusret H. Fişek Public Health Service Promotion Award" in his honor. It is bestowed every year to persons or organizations, which contributed to basic public health service.
- Turkish Medical Association established the "Prof. Dr. Nusret H. Fişek Public Health Science and Service Awards" since 1991.

=== Places Named After Him ===
==== Schools ====
- A vocational high school in Ankara for health science
- A study center in Ankara

==== Avenues ====
- Adıyaman, Tut İlçesi, Reşadiye Mah. (since 1970, the only one not posthumous)
- Ankara, Sıhhiye
- Adana, Seyhan
- Tekirdağ, Çorlu, Muhittin Mah.

==== Streets ====
- İzmir, Alsancak
- Denizli, Saltak
- Eskişehir, Odunpazarı, Batıkent

==== Sağlık Ocakları ====
- Ankara, Çankaya, Yıldız
- İzmir, Balçova, Onur Mah.
- İzmir, Balçova, Evka-1
- Manisa, Salihli

==== Parks ====
- Ankara, Batıkent

==== Busts ====
- Ankara, Hacettepe University (on two halls)
