= Hayrullah Fişek =

Turkish general and politician (1885–1975)

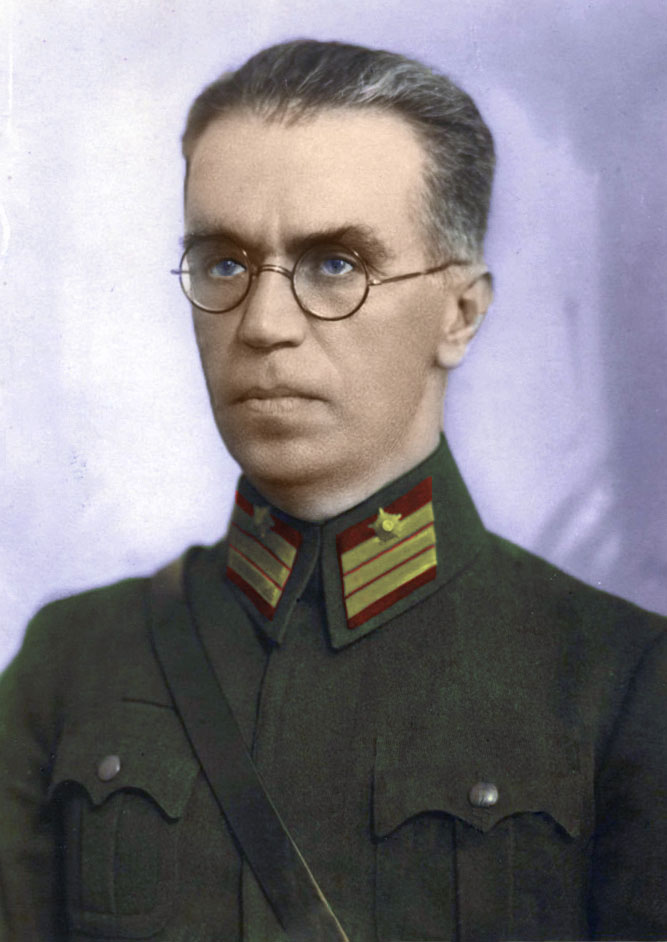
- Mirliva Hayrullah Pasha (11 November 1932)

Turkish Army

Undersecretary for the Ministry of National Defence

Personal details
- Born: 3 June 1885 Kalkandelen, Ottoman Empire (currently Tetovo, North Macedonia)
- Died: 13 July 1975 (aged 90) Ankara, Turkey
- Awards: Turkish Medal of Independence; Order of the Medjidie

Military service
- Allegiance: Ottoman Empire, Turkey
- Rank: Major general
- Battles/wars: First Balkan War; Second Balkan War; World War I Caucasus Campaign; Battle of Sakarya

General Hayrullah Fişek (Albanian: Hajrullah Fisheku; 1885–1975) was a career officer in the Ottoman Army and the Turkish Army (Captain, Ottoman War Academy, 1904 - rtd. 1945, Major-General (Mirliva) Undersecretary for the Ministry of National Defence).

== Life ==
Hayrullah Fişek, born in Kalkandelen (now Tetovo, North Macedonia), was a senior officer in the Ottoman Army. Hayrullah was given the name Fişek, meaning cartridge in Turkish. Hayrullah Fişek was a direct descendant of Süleyman Aga "Fişekçi" (born around 1775 in Kalkandelen), the founder of the Fişek family.

His parents were Hafiz Süleyman Efendi (1849 Kalkandelen – 1894 Balıkesir), a Land Registry Officer and Fatma Hanko (1847 Kalkandelen –1930 Istanbul), Sheikh Mustafa Ruhi Efendi's daughter.

=== Military career ===
He entered the Ottoman Military College in 1901. He completed the Military Academy as the seventh of the class in 1904 (1320-P.7) and joined the Ottoman military as an Infantry Second Lieutenant (Mülazım-ı Sani). In 1906, he entered the Staff College and he graduated as a Distinguished Captain (Mümtaz Yüzbaşı).

During the Turkish Independence War, he participated in the Battle of Sakarya as the chief of staff of the Provisional Corps (Mürettep Kolordu) and he served as the chief of staff of XIV Corps, Kocaeli Group, III Corps with the rank of staff lieutenant colonel. He also participated in battle at Balıkesir, Soma and Bandırma. He retired in 1946.

=== Family ===
He had one sister named Hatice (1873–1902) and 3 brothers : Abdülhâmit Bey (1866–1917), a Finance officer, Nuri Bey (1878–1945), and Zekeriya Bey (1880–1932), both officers of the Turkish Army.

Hayrullah married Mukaddes Fişek (1891–1958) and they had two sons: Nusret Fişek M.D. (1914–1990), Undersecretary, Ministry of Health and Hicri Fişek (1918–2002), Professor of International Law.

== Photos ==
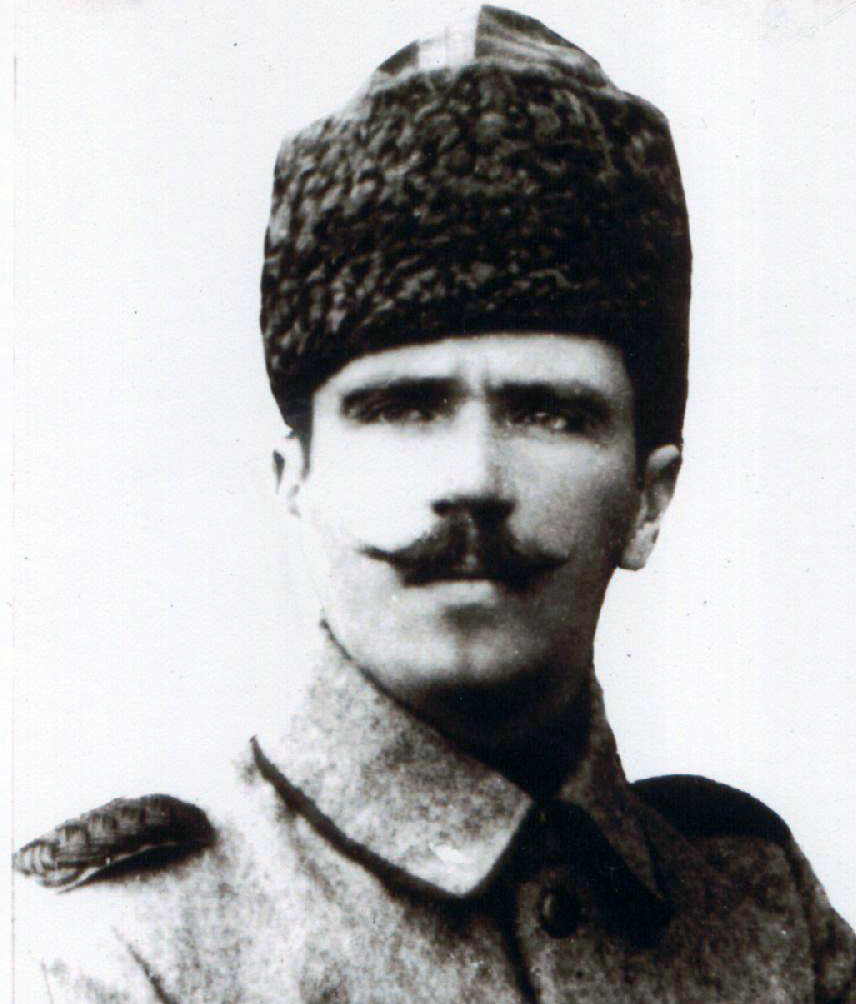
Hayrullah, 1917 (31 years old)

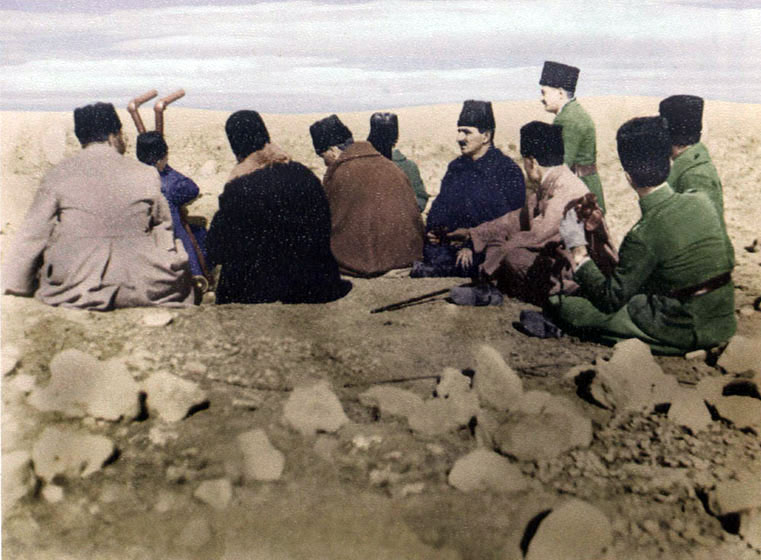
Battle of Sakarya, 10 September 1921. Duatepe, Polatli, observation hill. Fevzi Çakmak, Kazım Özalp, Mustafa Kemal, İsmet İnönü and Hayrullah Fişek

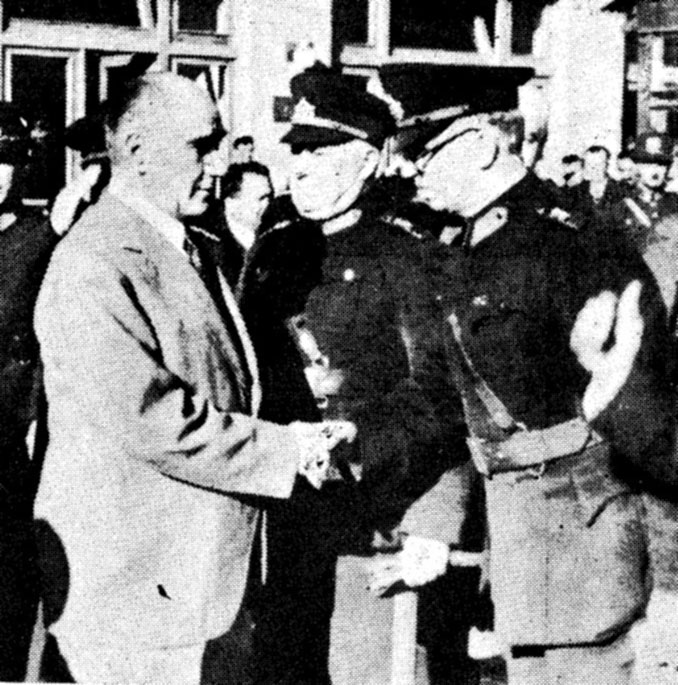
Mustafa Kemal Atatürk greeting General Hayrullah Fişek, Ankara Railway station, mid-1930s

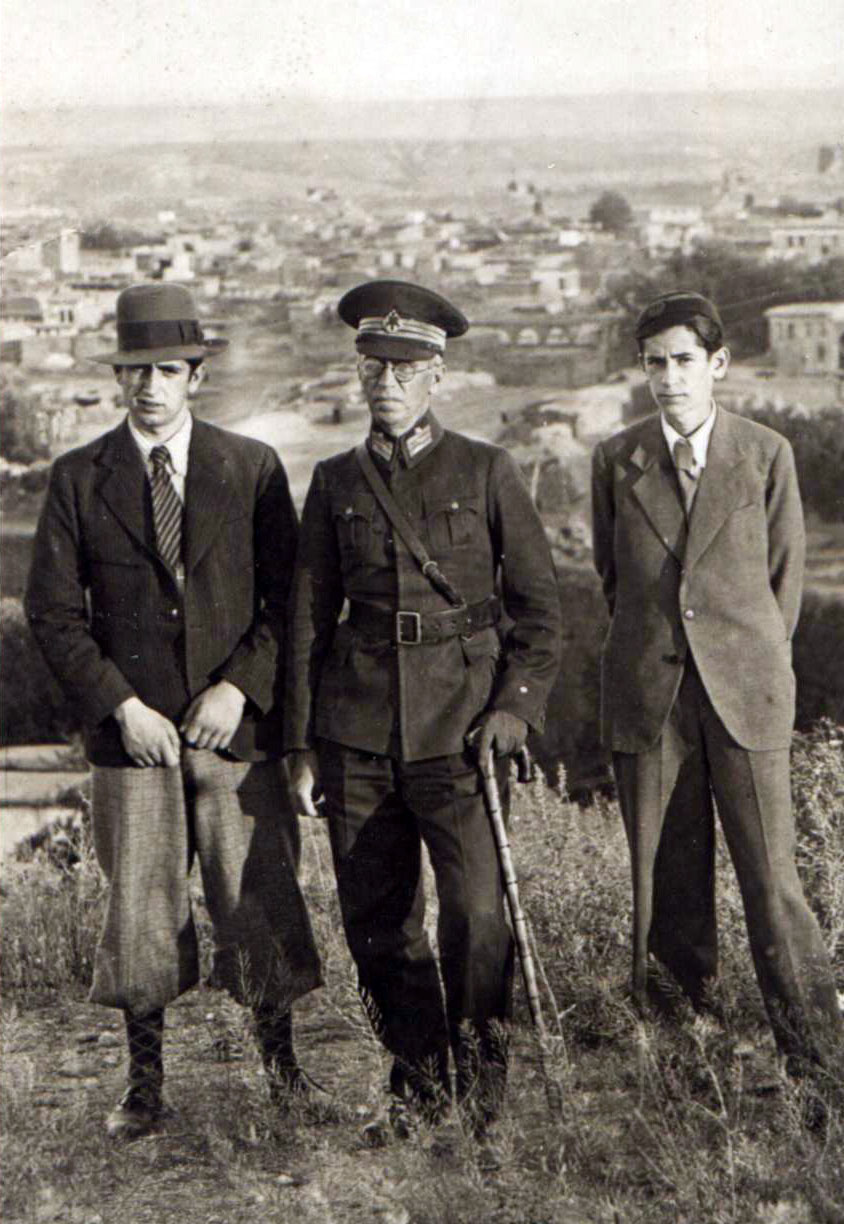
Hayrullah with his two sons Nusret Fişek and Hicri Fişek, Edirne, 1933

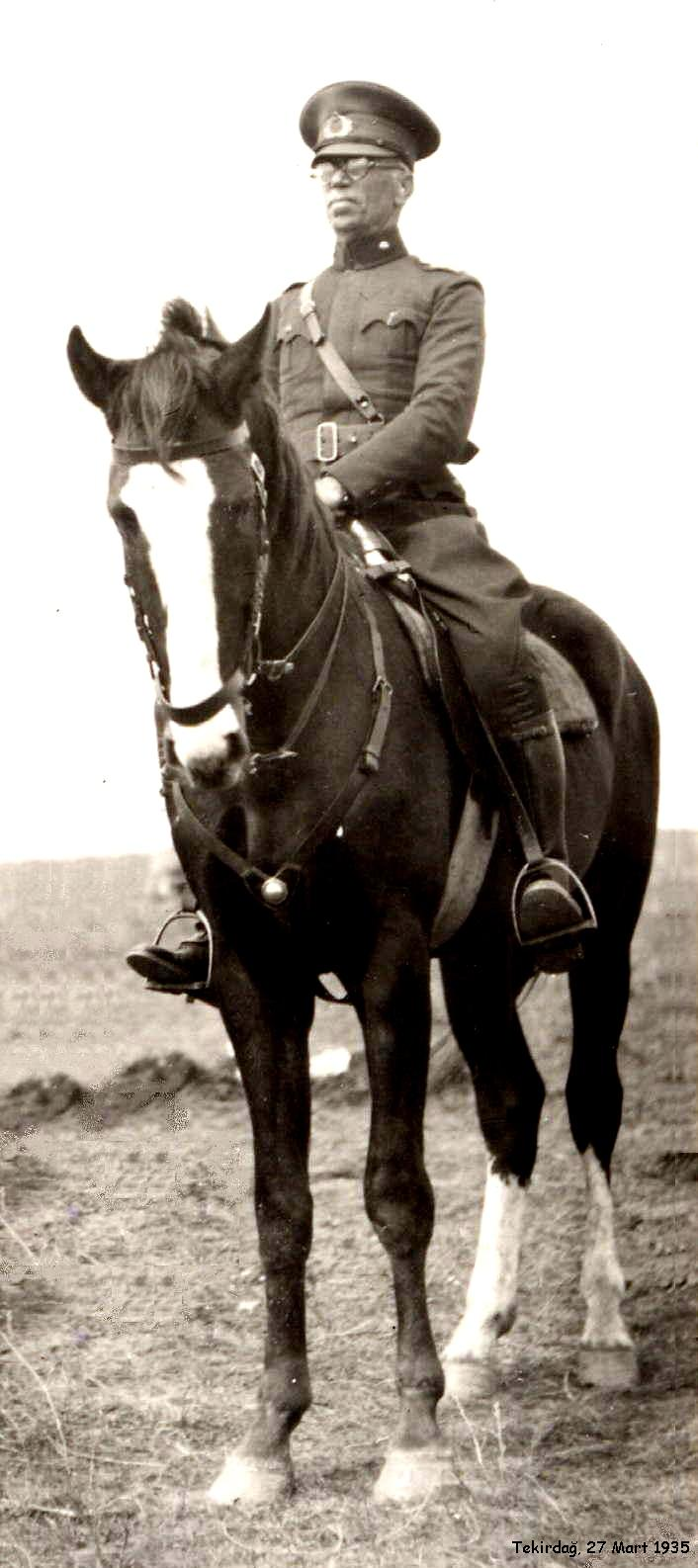
Hayrullah Pasha in 1935, Tekirdağ
