= Charles Kuentz (Egyptologist) =

American-born French Egyptologist

Charles Kuentz (June 19, 1895, in New York City – May 27, 1978, in Cairo) was an American-born French Egyptologist who was director of the Institut français d'archéologie orientale from 1940 to 1953. He married Jeanne Arcache, an Alexandria-based Lebanese poet and novelist, in 1945.
