= Charles Kuentz (soldier) =

Alsatian soldier (1897–2005)

- Born: Karl Kuentz; 18 February 1897; Ranspach, German Empire
- Died: 7 April 2005 (aged 108); Colmar, France
- Military career
- Branch: Imperial German Army; French Army
- Service years: 1916–1918; 1939–1940
- Conflicts: World War I • Western Front • Eastern Front; World War II

Charles Kuentz (18 February 1897 – 7 April 2005) was an Alsatian centenarian and veteran of World War I. He is known for having served in the German army during the Battle of Passchendaele in World War I, and the French army during World War II. He lived to the age of 108, dying in 2005.

Kuentz was born in Ranspach, Alsace, the son of a railwayman, and was conscripted by the Kaiser's army at the age of 19, since Alsace-Lorraine and its Franco-German ethnic population had been under German authority since 1871, following the French defeat in the Franco-Prussian War. While serving in the Imperial German Army during World War I, he saw action on both the Eastern and Western Fronts.

Following the Armistice on 11 November 1918, Kuentz returned home, even before he was officially mustered out of his unit. He returned to civilian life as a postal employee, married, and had four children. His homeland was now back under French control, and Kuentz chose to acquire the French nationality so at the outbreak of the Second World War he was called to service once again, but this time by France; however, his service was short-lived, as he was soon absolved of his obligation due to his age and marital/family status. When France surrendered to Germany in 1940, he was once again a German citizen. His son François was conscripted by the German military during the war and served in the Waffen SS. François was killed in action in 1944, during the Allies' Invasion of Normandy. After the fall of the Third Reich, Kuentz became once again a French citizen, which he would remain for the rest of his life.

In November 2004, he met British veteran Harry Patch, who had fought on the opposing side of him in the Battle of Passchendaele. This was filmed and later shown in the BBC One documentary The Last Tommy, broadcast in November 2005.

In that same year, Kuentz gave a series of thirty interviews, the purpose of which was to share his recollections of The Great War. He said that his aim in doing so was to ensure that the war would not be forgotten, and thus that such a tragedy would not be repeated.

Kuentz died in Colmar, aged 108 years and 48 days. He and his family had always considered themselves to be French, and he had been a member of multiple French patriotic organizations. At his funeral, which was attended by an honour guard composed of members from the patriotic organizations of which he himself had been a member, his coffin was draped with the French Flag.

At the time of his death, Kuentz was (although incorrectly) believed to have been the Imperial German Army's (and indeed all of Germany's) last surviving veteran of The Great War.
