= John Lovell (grocer) =

American politician

Member of the Los Angeles Common Council for the 4th Ward
- Preceded by: Milton Santee
- Succeeded by: Anthony McNally
- In office December 13, 1886 – December 10, 1888

Personal details
- Born: c. 1851
- Died: September 18, 1913 Venice, California
- Resting place: Angelus Cemetery, Los Angeles, California
- Spouse: Amelia Lovell
- Children: Mertie L. Lovell
- Occupation: Grocer; Businessman

John Lovell (c. 1851 – 1913) was a 19th-century businessman in Los Angeles, California, the owner of a grocery store and other property and a member of the Los Angeles Common Council, the governing body of the city. He suffered injuries to his head, was sent to a mental hospital and was said to have epilepsy.

== Personal ==
=== Birth and death ===
Lovell was born about 1851, and he died on September 18, 1913, in his home at 1302 Trolleyway in Venice, California, leaving his daughter, Mertie L. Lovell, four sisters and two brothers. Cremation was at Angelus Cemetery, Los Angeles.

=== Marriage ===
Lovell was engaged in a dispute over the terms of a will left by his wife, Amelia, who died in 1912 or before and left an estate valued at $75,000, but bequeathed only $500 to him. The suit was settled out of court: Lovell was given life interest in a house in Venice, California, and $550 in cash.

== Vocation ==
In 1882 he opened a grocery store in Los Angeles at the point where Spring, Ninth and Main streets meet, and a year later he bought a lot at Ninth and Main, "in a section that was then a fast-growing residence community," where he built a new store and remained in business for ten years. He also owned other property in the city.

=== Public service ===
Lovell represented the 4th Ward on the Los Angeles Common Council in 1886–87 and 1887–88. He was also a member of the Fire Commission.

== Injuries and medical condition ==
In February 1885, just as he had completed moving his business from one building on Ninth Street to another, Lovell engaged in a quarrel with his previous landlord, Paul Kern, words were exchanged and Kern "scooped up a big iron twine-holder, weighing three or four pounds," and with it struck Lovell over the head, cutting a gash "nearly three inches long," Police and medical aid were called, and Kern was discovered carrying a derringer in his pocket.

Lovell suffered an "apoplectic stroke" in December 1896 and fell to the pavement, striking his head and, it was said, fracturing his skull. He was not expected to survive, but he did recover. Six months later he was badly beaten in Santa Monica by a man who accused him of "insulting" the woman the assailant was with; the aggressor was convicted of assault and sentenced to six months in jail.

In October 1900 Lovell was sent to the Los Angeles County Hospital on a charge of insanity, sworn to by his wife. It was said that "for several years his health has been failing" and that he "had a severe fit, or fainting spell, and when he was revived his mind was gone." By 1905 he had been committed to an "insane asylum," with his wife named as his guardian. He was later released, and in 1909 he was referred to as an "epileptic."
