= James Lovell (sculptor) =

English sculptor and interior decorator

James Lovell (died 1778) was an English sculptor and interior decorator. From an obscure background, he has been taken to be a pupil of Peter Scheemakers and Laurent Delvaux.

== Works ==
- Stone chimneypiece at Hagley Hall
- Early 1750s, pendant for Wroxton Abbey
- 1754 North drawing room, Belhus mansion, Essex
- 1756 Church wall monument to Edward and Henrietta Montagu, in Horton, Northamptonshire Church, for Horace Walpole and possibly to his design
- c.1756 Statue of Caractacus in chains, Radway Grange
- Chelmsford Cathedral, monument to Benjamin Mildmay, 1st Earl FitzWalter
- c.1758 Church monument to Galfridus Mann at Linton, Kent, design by Richard Bentley
- Church tablet monument to James Wolfe at Westerham
- Norfolk House, chimneypiece and ceiling trophies (attributed), design by Giovanni Battista Borra
