= John Harvey Lovell =

American entomologist

- Born: October 21, 1860; Waldoboro, Maine, U.S.
- Died: August 2, 1939 (aged 78); Sanford, Maine, U.S.
- Occupation: American apiologist

John Harvey Lovell (1860–1939) was an internationally known amateur American naturalist and author who focused his studies on the interaction of flowers and bees and is credited with recording 32 bee species in southern Maine and demonstrating that bees can see in color.

== Personal life and education ==
Lovell was born in Waldoboro, Maine October 21, 1860 to sea captain Harvey Lovell and Sophonia (Bulfinch) Lovell. He attended local schools and was tutored by his uncle Rev. John J. Bulfinch, esq. for college and he attained degrees from Amherst College in 1882 and 1889. Lovell taught school in Nobleboro and Norridgewock, Maine, and had a fruit farm. Lovell married Lottie Evangeline Magune who assisted his research and had two sons Harvey Bulfinch Lovell and Ralph Marston Lovell. Harvey received a Ph.D. in zoology from Harvard in 1933 and they collaborated on six papers before John died in Sanford, Maine on August 2, 1939. Harvey went on to be a professor of biology at the University of Louisville and an author. When Lovell's father died John inherited a fortune allowing him to focus his life on his studies.

== Research ==
Lovell described himself as a field naturalist, as opposed to a laboratory naturalist, as his studies were done outdoors rather than in a laboratory. Lovell found bees hard to identify and thus began his interest in apiology, particularly studying honey bees. With Theodore D. A. Cockerell they identified 32 species in Maine and noted that some bees only visit one kind of flower such as the pickerel weed bee. He was described as being "...among the most conspicuous present-day field naturalists..." in 1922. He was noted to have recorded for the first time some "... intricate floral mechanisms and life histories of many Maine flowers." In his article "The Color Sense of the Honey-Bee: Can Bees Distinguish Colors?" Lovell concluded his testing proved that bees can determine the difference between natural and artificial colors and are influenced but not "obsessional" about colors. Another example of the observations and testing Lovell accomplished is discussed in his article "Conspicuous flowers rarely visited by insects.":

"Discusses the role of factors that attract insects to conspicuous flowers. Colors and odors attract the attention of insects, however, the absence of either will not necessarily cause a flower to be neglected if it contains an ample supply of pollen and nectar. The absence of either may result in the flower being discovered much later by insects. Experiments do not give any evidence that bees visit flowers for experiencing an aesthetic pleasure. Insects, especially bees, occasionally examine the neglected, conspicuous flowers of cultivation, but if there is no food material, they do not repeat their visits. The introduction of an odorless syrup into conspicuous flowers induces insects to visit in large numbers. Color is not brought into competition with odor, the latter is invariably given the advantage. Bees are largely guided by past experience. They are able to associate different sense impressions and make analogous inferences."

Lovell wrote hundreds of journal and newspaper articles in journals such as the Entomological News, Psyche, Cambridge, Canadian Entomologist, American Naturalist, Journal of Animal Behavior, The ABC and XYZ of Bee Culture, American Bee Journal, and the Maine Naturalist and was the biological editor of the Cyclopedia of Bee Culture. His two books are The Flower and the Bee: Plant Life and Pollination (1918) and Honey Plants of North America: (North of Mexico) A Guide to the Best Locations for Beekeeping in the United States (1926)

Lovell was a member of the Knox Academy of Arts and Sciences in Thomaston, Maine, and many other organizations.

== Partial list of articles ==
- "The colors of northern monocotyledonous flowers", The American Naturalist, vol 33, no 390, June 1899, 493–504.
- "The Colors of Northern Flowers" in Popular Science Monthly Volume 55, September 1899
- "The visitors of the Caprifoliaceae", The American Naturalist, vol 34, no 397, January 1900. 37–51.
- The Beginnings of American Science: The First Botanist (1904)
- Notes on the Bees of Southern Maine: Anthophoridae, Halictoididae, Macropidae and Panurgidae (1906)
- The Sphecodidae of southern Maine (1907)
- The Bee Species of Maine (1908)
- The Color Sense of the Honey-Bee: Is Conspicuousness an Advantage to Flowers? (1909)
- The Color Sense of the Honey-Bee: Can Bees Distinguish Colors? (1910)
- The Prosopididae of Southern Maine (1910)
- The Color Sense of the Honey-Bee: The Pollination of Green Flowers (1912)
- "Bees Which Visit Only One Species of Flower" in Popular Science Monthly Volume 81, August 1912
- The Evolution of Flowers (1917)
- Flower Odors and Their Importance to Bees: A Series of Articles (1934)
- Pollination of the Ericaceae: Chamaedaphne and Xolisma (1935)
- Articles on a Variety of Subjects (1936)
