= Jim Lovell (British Army soldier) =

British veteran of the First World War

James Lovell MM (10 February 1899 – 27 January 2004), known as Jim Lovell, was one of the last British veterans of the First World War and the last surviving decorated "Tommy". He joined the army in September 1916, but was not sent to the Western Front until April 1918, due to his age. At the time of his enlistment, two of his brothers were already in the army, one of whom had been wounded at Mons, whilst one of his sisters was in the Royal Flying Corps. Lovell served as a scout in the 8th Battalion of the Royal Berkshire Regiment, and was awarded the Military Medal for protecting a lieutenant from enemy fire by flanking him as he traveled along battlefield lines at the Somme to his base. He died just two weeks shy of his 105th birthday. In November 2005, interviews of his wartime experiences, that had been recorded shortly before his death, were broadcast on BBC One, in The Last Tommy.
