= Mansfield Lovell =

Confederate Army general (1822–1884)

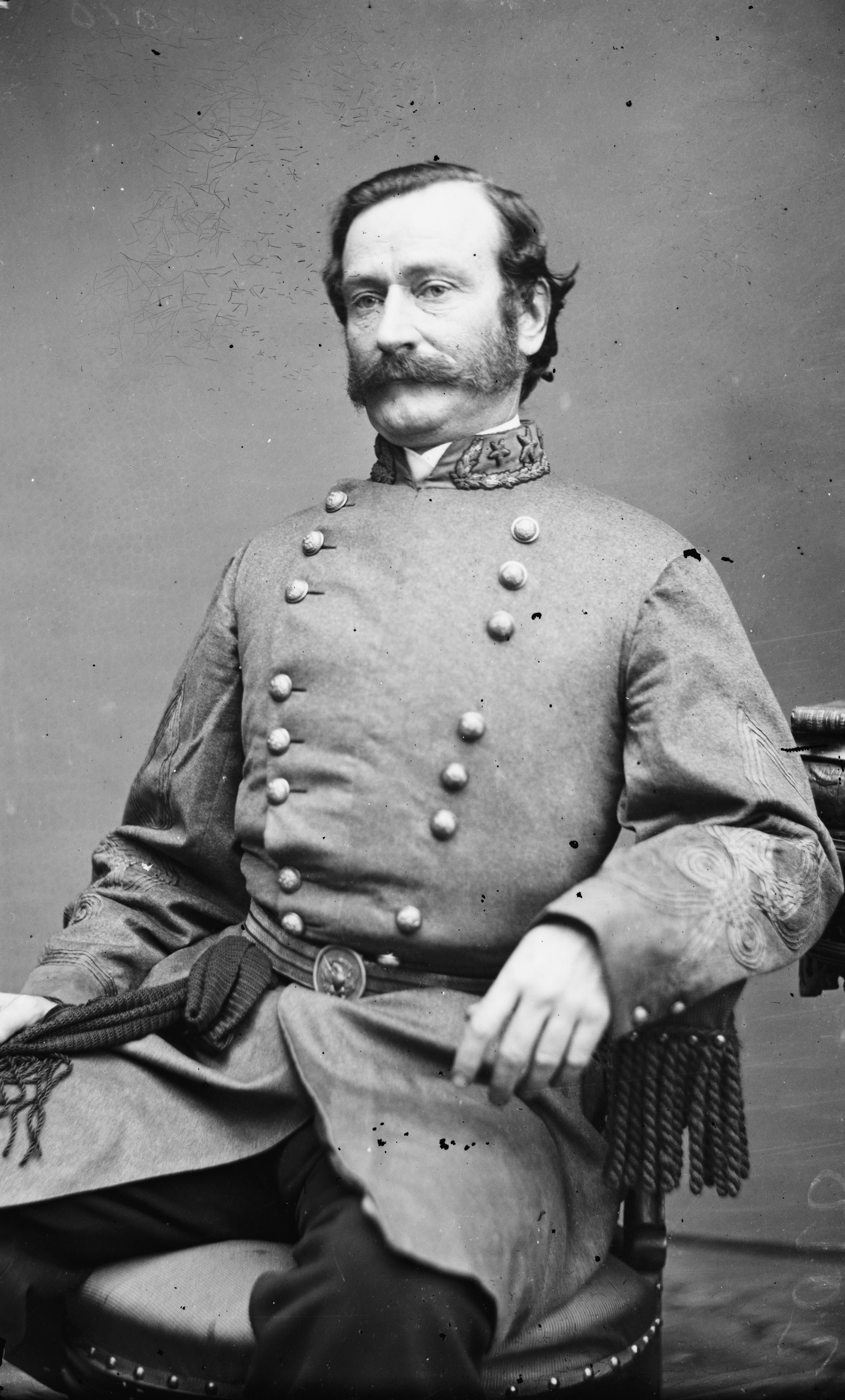
- Mansfield Lovell
- Born: October 20, 1822; Washington D.C.
- Died: June 1, 1884 (aged 61); New York City, New York
- Burial place: Woodlawn Cemetery (Bronx, New York)
- Alma mater: United States Military Academy (BS)
- Military career
- Allegiance: United States (Confederate States of America) Confederate States
- Branch: United States Army; Confederate States Army
- Service years: 1842–1854 (USA); 1861–1865 (CSA)
- Rank: Brevet Captain (USA); Major General (CSA)
- Conflicts: Mexican–American War: Battle of Monterrey; Battle of Chapultepec; American Civil War: Capture of New Orleans; Second Battle of Corinth

Mansfield Lovell (October 20, 1822 – June 1, 1884) was a major general in the Confederate States Army during the American Civil War. As military commander of New Orleans when the city unexpectedly fell to the Union Navy in 1862, Lovell was fiercely criticized by local citizens for failing to predict a naval invasion. The Confederate government also heaped blame on him, to deflect attention from their own error in leaving so few troops to defend the city. A court of inquiry later cleared him of charges of incompetence, but his reputation never recovered.

== Early life ==
Lovell was born in the District of Columbia. His father was Joseph Lovell, the eighth Surgeon General of the United States Army. His great grandfather, James Lovell, was an active member of the Whig organization in Boston before the American Revolution, and was a member of the Continental Congress from 1777 to 1782. He was one of the prime movers in the scheme to supplant General George Washington as commander-in-chief by General Horatio Gates and an original member of the Massachusetts Society of the Cincinnati.

Lovell graduated from the United States Military Academy in 1842 and was commissioned as a second lieutenant in the U.S. artillery. He was severely wounded at Belén Gate during the Battle of Chapultepec in the Mexican–American War, receiving a brevet appointment to captain for his service in that battle. After serving on a variety of minor posts, he resigned from the army in 1854 to join the abortive Cuban expedition of General John A. Quitman. He then moved to New York City, where he engaged in business and served as deputy street commissioner.

== Civil War ==
With the outbreak of the Civil War, Lovell left New York City and enlisted in the Confederate army. He was appointed as a major general on October 7, 1861, to replace Maj. Gen. David Twiggs. By the time Lovell was posted to New Orleans, Abraham Lincoln had approved plans for a Union Navy attempt to capture New Orleans by entering the Mississippi River at its mouth and sailing northward 80 miles to the city. Neither Lovell, or the city's officials or the Navy Department in Richmond thought this was a credible option and concentrated on plans to repel Union land forces from approaching the city from the Upper Mississippi area. Forts Jackson and St. Philip, the two Confederate forts at the mouth of the river, were believed sufficient to discourage an up-river assault in the unlikely event such a tactic was planned. From the beginning of the war, believing the city safe, much of its fighting forces were sent to other Southern battlefields, depleting the city of all but a small number of its Confederate Army defenders. When fishermen brought news of the landing of the Union ships off the Louisiana coast in February 1862, the inability of the Confederates to hold the city if the forts failed became obvious. When the forts could not be captured after several days' bombardment, Farragut's fleet slipped past them under cover of darkness and within four days appeared at the city's docks. While these ships were en route, the decision was made to evacuate the land defenses from New Orleans for use in fighting in the Louisiana interior and other parts of the Confederacy. It is believed Lovell's preparations to protect the city from a land invasion were sound, but Farragut's threat to bombard the vulnerable city with his formidable gunships once the fleet landed brought an end to Confederate New Orleans.

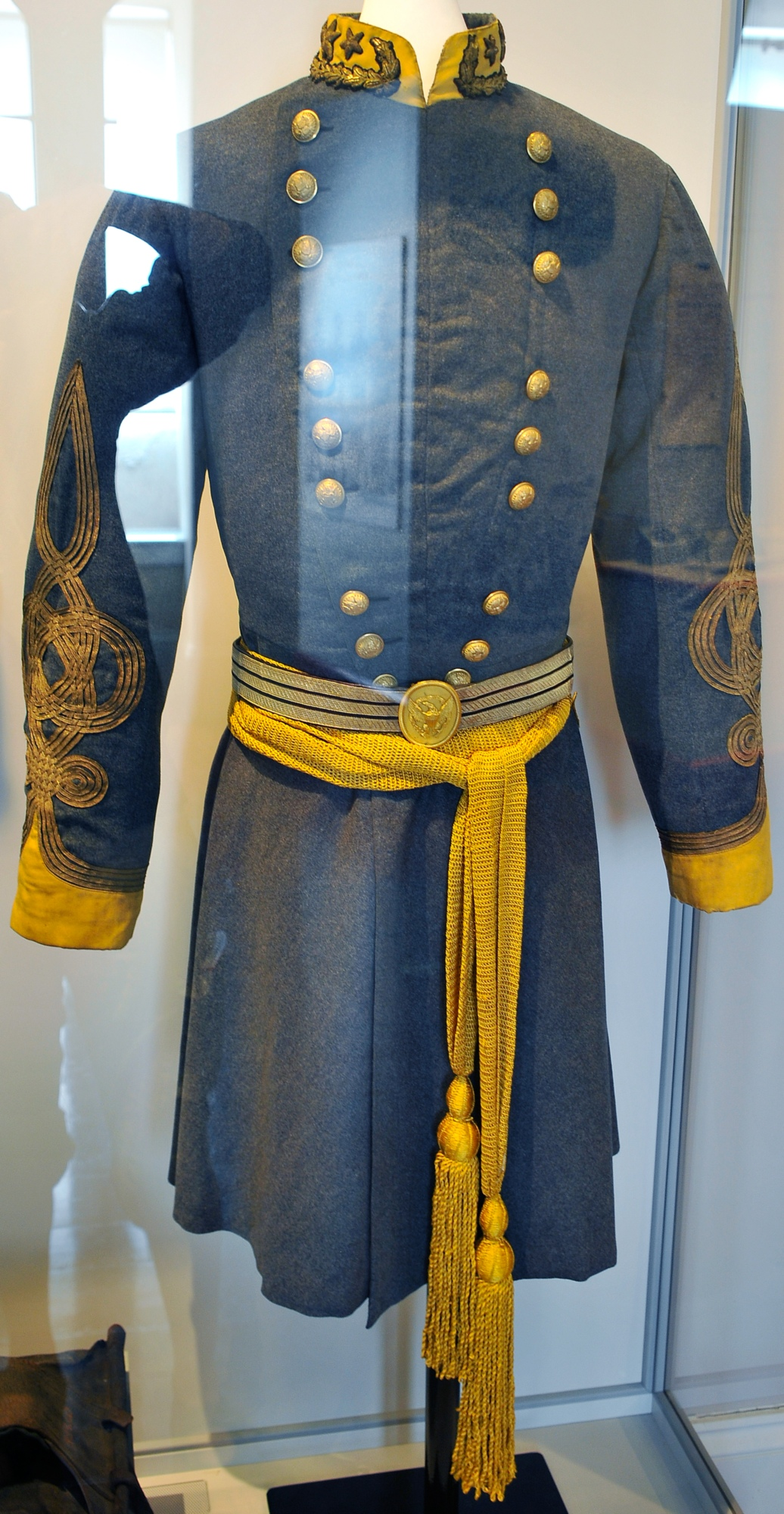
Lovell's uniform, Louisiana State Museum, The Cabildo

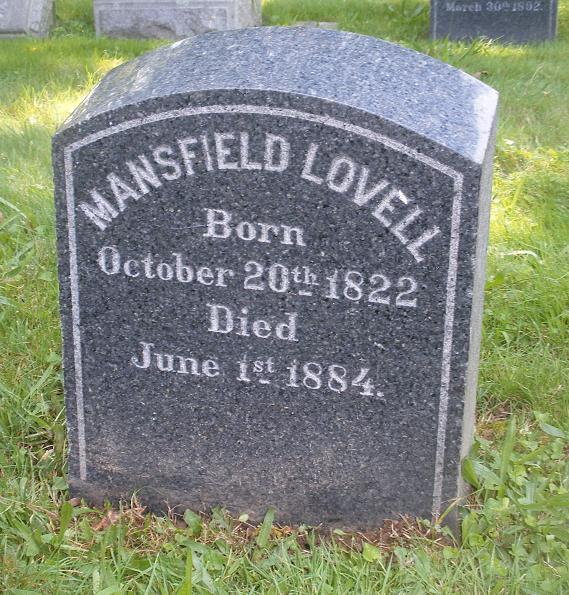
Lovell grave marker, Woodlawn Cemetery, Bronx

General Lovell was roundly criticized for his failure to prevent the fall of the city even though he did not have sufficient men or materiel to repulse the Union forces. He then commanded an infantry division under Maj. Gen. Earl Van Dorn at the Second Battle of Corinth in Mississippi. Historian Peter Cozzens stated that if Lovell had been more aggressive on the first day of battle, the Confederates might have won the battle. Cozzens excused Lovell's inertia on the second day, writing that any attack was probably doomed to fail. Lovell was later relieved of command as a consequence of his poor performance at New Orleans. Stung by this reprimand, he demanded a court of inquiry, which met in April 1863 and declared him innocent of charges of incompetence. However, he was not given any assignments for the rest of the war.

In his book about Confederate New Orleans, The Night the War Was Lost, author/historian Charles L. Dufour blames Jefferson Davis and in particular Naval Secretary Mallory for deciding that the land war in Virginia took greater precedence over giving more attention to the valuable port city of New Orleans. Its unanticipated fall into Union hands sent shockwaves not only through the Confederacy but Europe as well, where, next to New York City, it was the best-known of American cities. According to Dufour, the Davis government deflected blame onto Lovell for the loss of New Orleans in an effort to avoid being blamed by the Southern public. Lovell's valiant efforts to clear his name never really accomplished their goal. His honor and career were seen by Dufour as having been sadly sacrificed to the political power and reality of war.

== Postbellum life ==
Lovell farmed a rice plantation near Savannah, Georgia, immediately after the war, but a tidal wave destroyed his first crop, forcing him to return with his family to New York City. He resumed his career as a civil engineer and surveyor. Lovell worked under the supervision of former Union general John Newton on a project to clear obstructions from the East River at Hell Gate. He died in New York City and was buried in Woodlawn Cemetery in The Bronx, New York City.

== See also ==
- List of American Civil War generals (Confederate)
