= Şadan Fişek =

Turkish activist (1922–2002)

Association Culturelle Turquie France President

Association for Development of Early Childhood Education in Turkey Founding Member

Personal details
- Born: 28 February 1922 Istanbul, Turkey
- Died: 23 July 2002 (aged 80) Ankara, Turkey
- Spouse: Prof. Dr. Hicri Fişek (1918-2002)
- Children: 2 sons

Şadan Fişek (28 February 1922 – 23 July 2002) was a president of the Association Culturelle Turquie France, a cultural association between France and Turkey and founding member of the Association for Development of Early Childhood Education in Turkey. She received the French Légion d'Honneur in 1989.
