= Alfred Finnigan =

- Born: Alfred Benjamin Finnigan; September 18, 1896
- Died: May 11, 2005 (aged 108)
- Military career
- Allegiance: United Kingdom
- Branch: British Army
- Unit: 15th Brigade Royal Field Artillery.
- Conflicts: First World War
- Awards: Legion of Honour

Alfred Benjamin Finnigan (18 September 1896 – 11 May 2005) was a United Kingdom soldier who fought in World War I and gained fame because of his longevity. At the time of his death at age 108, he had been one of only 14 known British survivors of that war.

== Early life ==
Finnigan's family emigrated to Australia when he was a boy, where he gained experience with horses that was to stand him in good stead when he joined the Army in 1914. He was posted to France in 1916 as the driver of a team of six horses pulling an 18-pounder gun with the 15th Brigade Royal Field Artillery.

== National service ==
After witnessing the carnage of the Somme offensive of 1916, Finnigan's battery was one of those sent to assist the Italians after their reverses at Caporetto. By 1918, however, the battery had returned to Northern France to help stall the last great German offensive of the war. Finnigan also fought at the battle of Vimy Ridge, and was gassed in Passchendaele. In much later life, Alfred did not speak much of the war, but his great-nephew Mark recalls that one of the things that upset Alfred greatly was the death and suffering to the horses, as he was a great animal lover.

Finnigan returned to Australia after the war, but opted to settle in England, working his passage back home as a seaman in 1927; the ship was called the Sir William Mitchel and was the last sailing to sail from Australia to England. Alfred was one of the only crew who were working their passage who could read and therefore wrote the ship's log, this log can be found in the Greenwich Maritime Museum in London.

In his personal life, Finnigan did not drink alcohol because his mother was treated so badly by his father, who was a drunk. Finnigan was also an atheist, mainly because his mother was a strict Catholic who had a very hard life and died a terrible death with cancer. Finnigan said if there was a God he would never have let a strict Catholic and kind lady like his mother be treated like this and die in such a way.

== Recognition ==
Along with other surviving World War I servicemen, he was awarded the French Légion d’Honneur in 1998.
