= Hicri Fişek =

Turkish professor of international law (1918–2002)

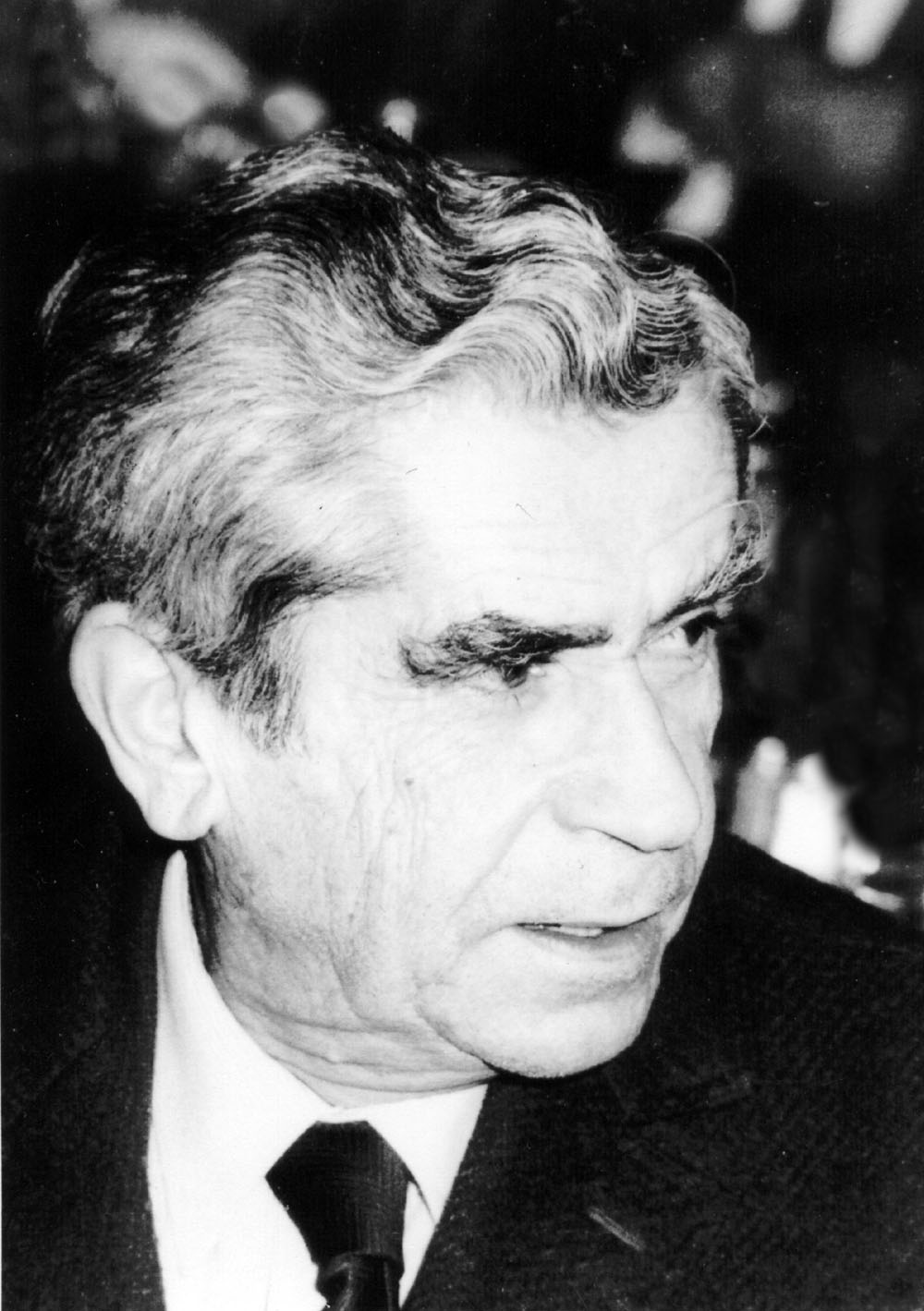

Professor of international law

UNIDROIT Member of the Governing Council
- In office 1978–2002

United Nations Member of the Sub-Commission on Prevention of Discrimination and Protection of Minorities
- In office 1978–1983

Turkish Social Democratic party (SODEP) Founding member - Secretary General

Personal details
- Born: 22 September 1918 Smyrna, Ottoman Empire
- Died: 26 February 2002 (aged 83) Ankara, Turkey
- Spouse: Şadan Fişek (1922–2002)
- Children: 2 sons

Hicri Fişek (22 September 1918 – 26 February 2002) was a Turkish professor of international law.

He founded the "Tevfik Fikret" high-school in Ankara, Turkey, in 1964. He received the French Légion d'Honneur (Chevalier 1964; Officier 1975), and was awarded an Honorary Degree by the University of Strasbourg in 1974.

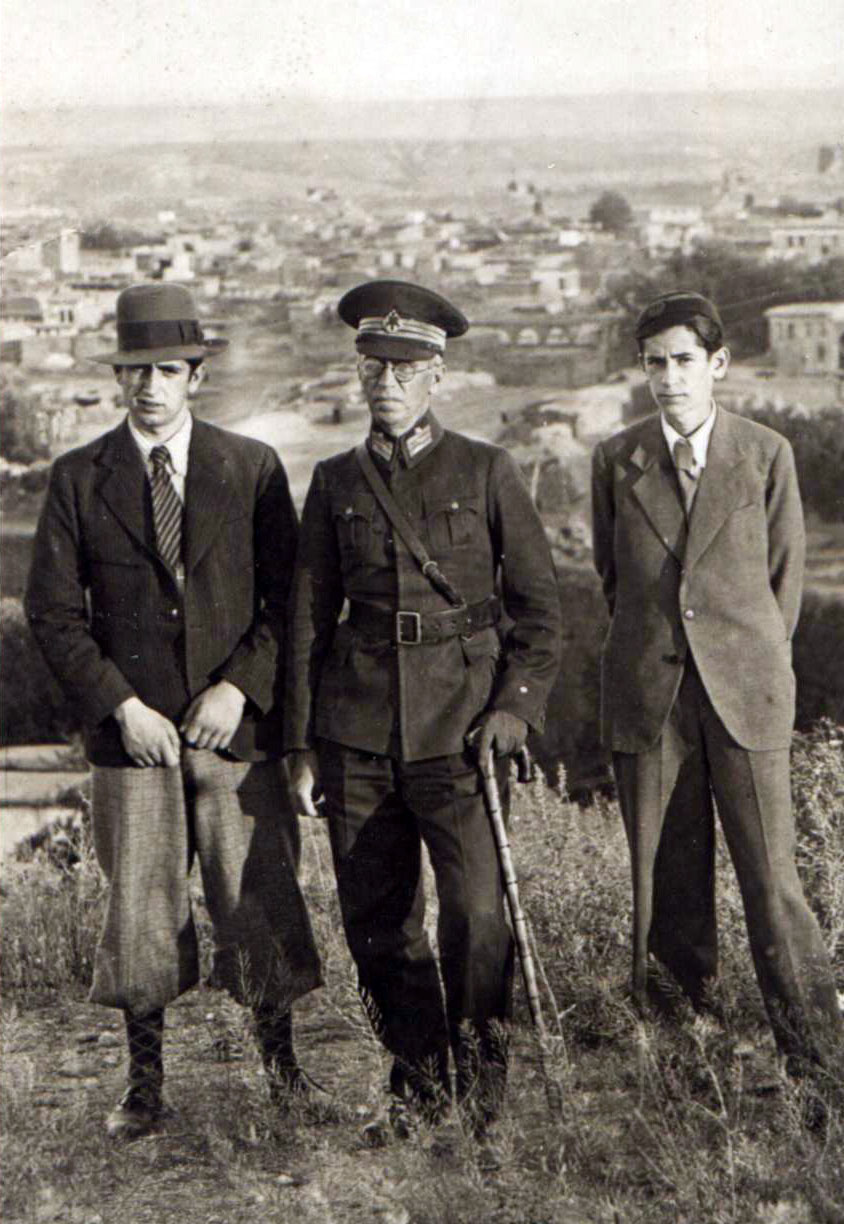
Hicri Fisek (right) with his father General Hayrullah Fişek and brother Nusret Fişek (Edirne, 1933)
