= Joseph Lovell =

American Surgeon general

Dr. Joseph Lovell
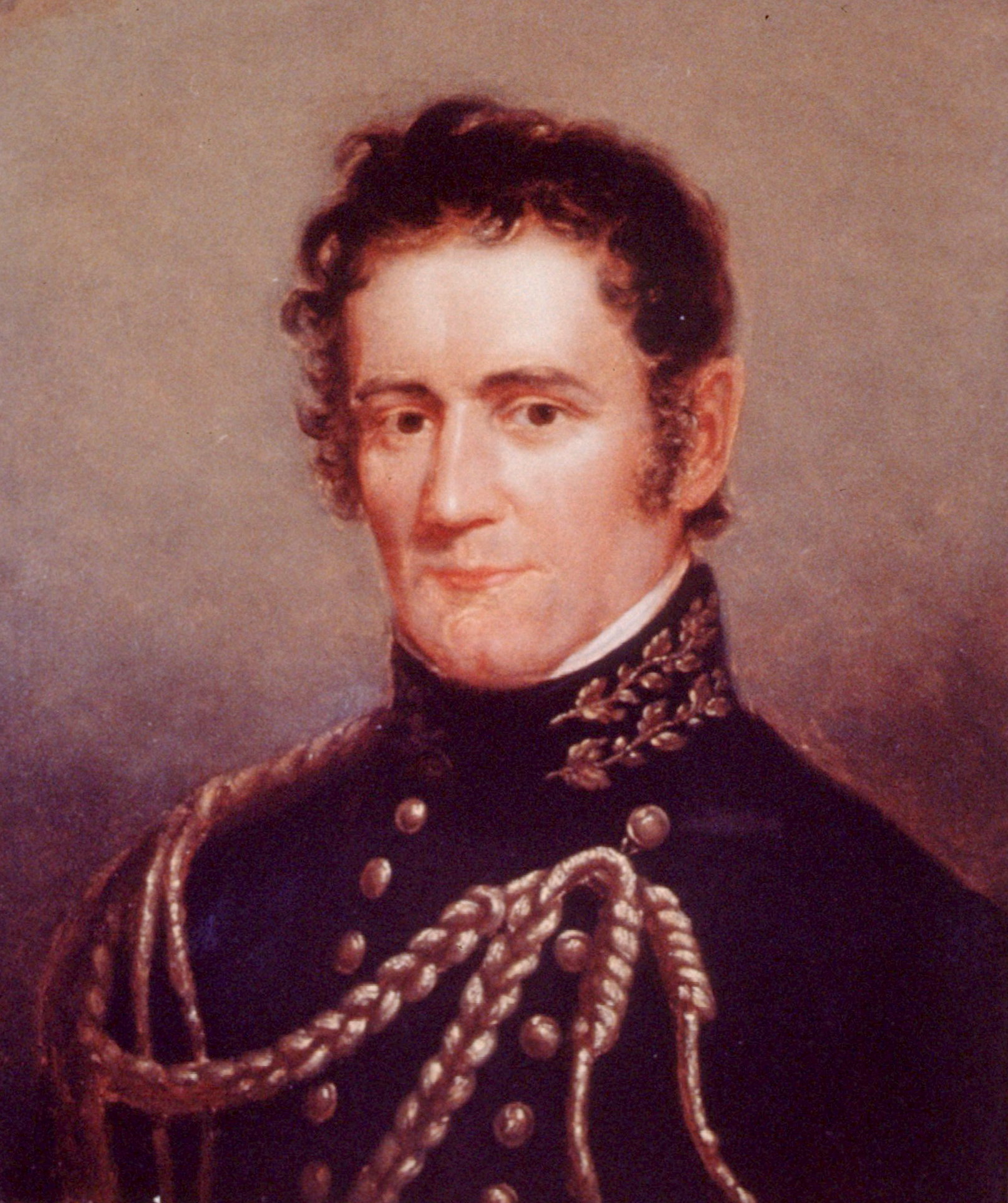
- Joseph Lovell
- Born: December 22, 1788; Boston, Massachusetts
- Died: October 17, 1836 (aged 47); Washington, D.C.
- Education: Harvard College; Harvard Medical School
- Occupation: Surgeon General of the United States Army
- Relatives: James S. and Deborah (Gorham) Lovell
- Medical career
- Institutions: United States Army

Dr. Joseph Lovell (December 22, 1788 – October 17, 1836) was the 8th Surgeon General of the United States Army, (April 18, 1818 – October 17, 1836),

== Family ==
He was born in Boston, Massachusetts, the son of James S. and Deborah (Gorham) Lovell. His grandfather, James Lovell, was an active member of the Whig organization in Boston before the Revolution, and was a member of the Continental Congress from 1777 to 1782. He was one of the prime movers in the scheme to supplant General Washington as commander-in-chief by General Horatio Gates. He was an original member of the Massachusetts Society of the Cincinnati.

== Life ==
Lovell obtained his early education in the Boston schools, after which he entered Harvard College, where he graduated in 1807. He began the study of medicine with Dr. William Ingalls of Boston and graduated from the Harvard Medical School in 1811, with the first class to receive the degree of M. D. With the practical certainty of a second war with Britain, Congress passed an act on January 11, 1812 (2 Stat. 671), increasing by thirteen regiments the military forces of the country, and providing a surgeon and two surgeon's mates for each regiment. On May 15, 1812, Lovell was appointed major and surgeon, 9th US Infantry Regiment. With an unusually thorough medical education, he early became an outstanding medical officer. When, late in 1812, the troops were moved to the Canada–US border, general hospitals were established at Plattsburgh, New York, and at Burlington, Vermont, Lovell was detached from his infantry regiment and placed in command of the Burlington Hospital. During this time, while the hospitals as a whole came under severe criticism the Burlington Hospital was held up as a model of what a hospital should be. Lovell attracted attention not only as a skilled practitioner but as an officer of marked executive ability. In recognition of his exceptional service he was selected for appointment to the grade of hospital surgeon on June 30, 1814. During the latter part of the war his longest service was in the hospital at Williamsville, New York, which received the casualties for the operations along the Niagara River.

In 1817, Lovell, then chief medical officer of the Northern Department, addressed to Major General Jacob Brown, the department commander, a letter dealing with the Sick Report of the Northern Division for the Year ending June 30, 1817, in which he discussed not only the cause of disease in the army, but also gave his views upon the duties of medical officers and their responsibility for the sickness occurring among the troops.

=== Army reorganization ===
During the winter and spring of 1818, Congress was engaged on a bill for the reorganization of the staff of the army. This bill, passed April 14, 1818 (3 Stat. 426), repealed certain previous legislation in regard to the medical department and carried the following section:

Section 2. And be it further enacted, That there shall be one Surgeon General, with a salary of two thousand five hundred dollars per annum, one assistant surgeon general with the emoluments of a hospital surgeon * * * and that the number of post surgeons be increased not to exceed eight to each division.

Pursuant to this legislation, Lovell was appointed Surgeon General to date from April 18, 1818, with Hospital Surgeons Tobias Watkins and James C. Bronaugh, assistants, one for each of the two divisions of the army. Apothecary General Le Barron was retained in his old position. Though only in his thirtieth year, his services in the hospitals on the northern frontier during the war and his appreciation of the needs of the service as evidenced by his reports made Lovell the logical choice for head of the service. Thus was established for the first time a permanent medical department organization. For the first time a career medical officer was made chief of the service. All of the former chiefs had been appointed to meet the emergency of war, real or expected, with an organization to serve the forces in the field. Again, for the first time was bestowed upon the service chief the title of surgeon general, which has survived to the present day. Immediately following Lovell's appointment the following order was issued by the War Department:

All reports, returns and communications connected with the Medical Department will hereafter be made to the Surgeon General's Office in Washington.

All orders and instructions relative to the duties of the several officers of the Medical Staff, will be issued through the Surgeon General, who will be obeyed and respected accordingly.

The Assistant Surgeon Generals will forthwith commence the inspections of the Medical Department in their respective divisions agreeably to the instructions they receive from the Surgeon General.

Lovell saw as an early duty the revision of the Medical Regulations. The regulations of December 1814 had been superseded by those of April 24, 1816, but these were defective in that they were not adapted to the new organization or to the provisions of the order quoted above. The result was the Regulations of the Medical Department, September 1818. In his first report to Secretary of War Calhoun in November 1818, he dwelt upon the difficulty of obtaining from medical officers compliance with orders, particularly in regard to reports and returns. In reply the Secretary called upon him for recommendations for the improvement of the medical service. Lovell began his recommendations with the statement that the first requisite was to make the position of a medical officer such that he would place some value upon the retention of his office, at that time held in low esteem. Recruitment of officer personnel was difficult and the retention of suitable men even more so. He asked an increase in the number of medical officers and an increase in their pay and allowances. With officers with a sense of responsibility he promised appreciable economies in medical supplies. He recommended further that the Apothecary General be authorized to make all purchases of medical supplies and that purchasing officers be bonded for the proper application of public funds. Though no immediate legislation ensued, the changes advocated were all brought about during Lovell's term of office.

On March 2, 1821 (3 Stat. 615), Congress passed an act reducing the army and reorganizing the staff corps. Section 10 defined the future medical staff as follows:

And be it further enacted, That the medical department shall consist of one surgeon general, eight surgeons with the compensation of regimental surgeons and forty-five assistant surgeons with the compensation of post surgeons.

Thus was abolished the old system of titles which had stood since the Revolution, with the substitution of a new system which was to last for nearly ninety years, though military rank and titles came in 1847. This reorganization brought about the discharge of the Apothecary General and his assistants. In 1825 a new edition of the Medical Regulations was issued. It was essentially the same as that of 1818, except as to phraseology to conform to the new designations of the medical officers. The office of Assistant Surgeon General was changed to that of Medical Director of Department and the duties of the Apothecary General and his assistants were assigned to officers detailed to the purveying department. An important addition was a paragraph calling for the examination by a board of three medical officers of all applicants for the position of assistant surgeon. This provision was not put into effect until after the issue by the War Department of General Orders, No. 58, July 7, 1832, which defined the requisites for appointment. Thus was initiated the foremost factor in the high professional standing of the corps to the present day. An act of Congress of June 30, 1834 (4 Stat. 714), confirmed the provisions for entrance examinations and fixed the pay and allowances of medical officers relative to those of other officers of the service.

A dangerous crisis developed in 1830, when, in the midst of agitation for retrenchments, Secretary of War Eaton suggested the abolition of the office of Surgeon General. In a letter to Congress in support of his administration, Lovell was so far successful that he not only saved his own office but obtained an increase in the number of officers in the corps.

=== Societies ===
During the 1820s, Lovell was a member of the prestigious society, Columbian Institute for the Promotion of Arts and Sciences, who counted among their members former presidents Andrew Jackson and John Quincy Adams and many prominent men of the day, including well-known representatives of the military, government service, medical and other professions.

=== Black Hawk War ===
During Lovell's term of office occurred the Black Hawk War and the beginning of the long continued struggle with the Seminoles of Florida. In 1832, incident to the trouble with the Sacs and Foxes in Illinois and Wisconsin, troops were sent to that section by way of Buffalo and the Great Lakes. Cholera broke out on two boats en route from Buffalo to Chicago. The troops were debarked in the vicinity of Detroit and put into camp. Nearly four hundred cases developed with eighty-eight deaths. The Seminole War began on December 28, 1835, when the Indians, under Osceola, ambushed and destroyed two companies of the 4th Infantry under command of Major Dade. The anxieties incident to furnishing medical service for the troops collecting for the punitive campaign weighed heavily upon Lovell. He established a medical supply depot at Tampa and a general hospital at St. Augustine. He asked for an increase of medical officers and a small addition was authorized on July 4, 1835. The report of June 4 with its request for additional officers was his last important act.

=== Death ===
His wife, to whom he was deeply attached, died about this time and the double burden of anxieties was too much for an always delicate constitution. He died in Washington on October 17, 1836, near the end of his forty-eighth year.

Lovell's death, preceded by a few months by that of his wife, Margaret Mansfield Lovell, left an orphaned family of eleven children. A son, Mansfield Lovell, graduated from West Point and became a major general and corps commander in the Confederate army during the Civil War.

== Service as Surgeon General ==
Less than thirty years of age and with but six years of service when he became Surgeon General, Lovell's eighteen years' tenure of office were marked by constant improvement in the efficiency of the service and in the status of the officers of the corps. With a wholesome pride in his office and in the service which he represented, he strove to foster that same pride throughout the corps and to render the military establishment conscious of its obligations to the medical service. Quite beyond the medical department he rendered conspicuous service to every branch and department of the army. More than any other person he was responsible for the abolition of the whiskey ration which was making drunkards throughout the army. He was largely instrumental in the passage by Congress of a bill by which unsuitable and inefficient officers could be eliminated from the army by action of a board of officers. From his personal observations he was able to make recommendations which brought about notable improvements in the ration and clothing of the soldier. One of his first acts as Surgeon General was to require from all army posts quarterly reports by the medical officers on weather conditions and on the incidence and causes of diseases. The compilations of these reports have high historic value. The weather reports thus begun were the beginning of the present Weather Bureau. A notable service by Lovell was the encouragement and official assistance which he gave to Surgeon William Beaumont in the study of gastric physiology.

Lovell's office began the collection of medical literature which was to become the Library of the Surgeon General's Office, later called the Army Medical Library, the Armed Forces Medical Library, and finally transformed in 1956 into the National Library of Medicine.

In 1842, the officers of the medical corps testified to their appreciation of Lovell's services to them and to their personal esteem for him by the erection of a handsome monument over his grave in the Congressional Cemetery in Washington.

== Legacy ==
During the American Civil War Lovell General Hospital in Portsmouth, Rhode Island was named after him.

Lovell General Hospital at Fort Devens, Massachusetts was also named after him.

== Site links ==
- F. F. Harrington, Harvard Medical School, Vol. II (1905); H. E. Brown Medical Department of the U. S. Army from 1775 to 1873 (1873); J. E. Pilcher Surgeon Generals of the Army (1905); Dictionary of American Biography, Vol. II (1933); National Intelligencer, Washington, October 19, 1836.
- Extracted from "Chiefs of the Medical Department, U.S. Army 1775–1940, Biographical Sketches," Army Medical Bulletin, No. 52, April 1940, pp. 27–32, compiled by James M. Phalen, Colonel, Medical Corps, U.S. Army retired.

This article is originally based on public domain work produced by the U.S. Army.
