= James Lovell (politician) =

American Founding Father and politician

Delegate from Massachusetts to the Continental Congress
- In office January 8, 1777 – April 3, 1782
- Preceded by: Rufus King
- Succeeded by: John Lowell

Secretary of the Congressional Committee on Foreign Affairs
- In office April 17, 1777 – January 6, 1781
- Preceded by: Thomas Paine
- Succeeded by: Office abolished

Personal details
- Born: October 31, 1737 Boston, Massachusetts, British America
- Died: July 14, 1814 (aged 76) Windham, Massachusetts, U.S.
- Children: James
- Parent: John Lovell
- Education: Harvard University (MA)
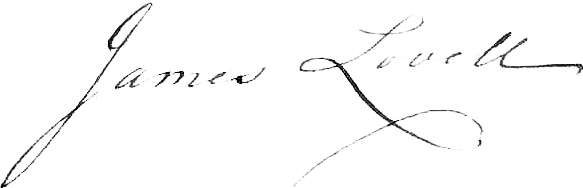
- Signature

James Lovell (October 31, 1737 – July 14, 1814) was a United States Founding Father, educator, and statesman from Boston, Massachusetts. He was a delegate for Massachusetts to the Continental Congress from 1777 to 1782. He was a signatory to the Articles of Confederation.

== Early life ==
Lovell was born in Boston and had his preparatory education at the Boston Latin School. His father John Lovell (1710–1778) was the school's headmaster from 1738 until 1775. James attended Harvard and graduated in 1756. He then joined his father and taught at the Latin School, while continuing his own studies. He received a Master of Arts degree from Harvard in 1759. Father and son continued their work in the Latin School until it was closed in April 1775, during the Siege of Boston in the American Revolutionary War.

While the school produced a number of revolutionary leaders, including John Hancock and Samuel Adams, the approaching revolution split father and son. John Lovell wrote and endorsed Loyalist or Tory positions, while James became aligned with the Whigs and associated growing rebel sentiment. He was chosen to give an oration to the town the first year after the Boston Massacre, which he delivered at the Old South Church. Following the Battle of Bunker Hill on June 17, 1775, the new military Governor William Howe, ordered the arrest of likely dissidents in Boston. James Lovell was picked up in the sweep and spent nine months in the Boston Stone Jail.

General Howe evacuated Boston in March 1776, taking all British troops and Loyalists. James was transported with the British fleet as a prisoner and taken to Halifax, Nova Scotia, where he spent nine months in the jail. His father also sailed with the British fleet to Halifax in March 1776, as part of the general exodus of Loyalists when British forces abandoned the city. In November 1776, James was exchanged for Colonel Philip Skene. When he got back to Boston in December, he was elected to be a delegate to the Continental Congress, to which he served until 1782.

== Congressional career ==
Lovell served effectively in the Congress during the six years that were critical to the American Revolution. He was particularly important as a long-term member of the Committee of Foreign Correspondence and that of Secret Correspondence. He signed the Articles of Confederation, endorsing them for Massachusetts on July 9, 1778. During his appointment to the Committee for Foreign Affairs, he created and implemented ciphers for the country. The ciphers he created were somewhat difficult and complex to use as described and referenced by John Adams "I have letters from the president and from Lovell, the last unintelligible, in ciphers, but inexplicable by his own cipher." and Benjamin Franklin "If you can find the key & decypher it, I shall be glad, having myself try'd in vain." as expressed in their letters to Francis Dana of March 1781.

In one area his performance was controversial. In 1776 and 1777, there was a growing struggle for influence and command in the Continental Army. Lovell became a supporter of Horatio Gates in his lobbying quest for command. He encouraged Gates in reporting directly to Congress, in effect going over General Washington's head. This reached its peak when Gates was given command of the Northern Department, replacing Philip Schuyler in the summer of 1777. The controversy also extended into his family along political lines as he was a fervent Whig as opposed to his father who was a Loyalist.

Lovell was also a frequent correspondent with both John and Abigail Adams. In his correspondence to Abigail, he flirted wondering what John was doing with his private time in France. He also used Abigail's pet name of Portia in his correspondence.

== Later events ==
After his term in Congress, Lovell returned to teaching but continued to hold various political offices. He was collector of taxes in Massachusetts from 1784 to 1788 and Customs Officer of Boston in 1778 and 1789. He was appointed as a naval officer of the port of Boston and Charlestown from 1789 and held that position until his death. He died in Windham, Maine (then part of Massachusetts) on July 14, 1814.

== Family ==
His son, James Lovell (1758–1850) served in the Continental Army from 1776 to 1782. After graduating from Harvard in 1776, he joined the 16th Massachusetts regiment as a lieutenant and saw action at Battle of Monmouth and in Rhode Island. In 1779, he was assigned as adjutant and major to Light Horse Harry Lee's Southern Legion and fought in the southern campaigns. He is reported to have fought valiantly and was wounded several times.

Lovell's grandson was Joseph Lovell, who served as the first Surgeon General of the Army from 1818 until 1836.
