= The Boys Are Coming Home =

2005 musical by Leslie Arden and Berni Stapleton

The Boys Are Coming Home was the second new musical to emerge from AMTP at Northwestern University. Written in 2005 and based on Shakespeare’s comedy Much Ado About Nothing, the musical is set in the year 1945, when American servicemen returned home from World War II. With music and lyrics by Leslie Arden and book by Berni Stapleton, The Boys Are Coming Home is a "journey through the joys and challenges of post-war life". The Boys Are Coming Home was directed by Gary Griffin (assisted by Jason Tyne).

The Boys Are Coming Home was chosen for inclusion in the National Alliance for Music Theatre Festival of New Works in New York City and was renamed One Step Forward.

It was listed on the Goodman Theatre's 2007–8 season with a new book by Rebecca Gilman and was to be directed by David Petrarca. This would have been the second Arden/Petrarca team-up with their first being Goodman's production of The House of Martin Guerre back in 1996, but irreconcilable artistic points of view among the key collaborators scuttled the planned premiere (which reverted to its original title The Boys Are Coming Home) and director Chuck Smith's staging of Ain't Misbehavin' assumed the dates of The Boys are Coming Home.
