= AMTP =

AMTP may refer to:-

- Association du Musée des Transports de Pithiviers, the organisation which has preserved part of the Tramway de Pithiviers à Toury in France
- American Music Theatre Project
- α-Methyltryptophan, a serotonergic agent
