= Leslie Arden =

Canadian musical theatre composer

- Born: Leslie Arden Jenkins; Beverly Hills, California, U.S.
- Education: studied with Stephen Sondheim at Oxford University
- Occupations: Canadian musical theatre composer, lyricist and librettist
- Relatives: parents Cleone Duncan and Paul Howard Jenkins
- Writing career
- Language: English
- Notable work: The House of Martin Guerre (co-book by Anna Theresa Cascio)
- Website: lesliearden.com

Leslie Arden is a Canadian musical theatre composer, lyricist and librettist. She is best known for her work The House of Martin Guerre (co-book by Anna Theresa Cascio) produced by Theatre Plus (1993), the Goodman Theatre (1996) in Chicago and the Canadian Stage Company (1997).

== Early life and education ==
She was born Leslie Arden Jenkins in Beverly Hills, California to Canadian singer Cleone Duncan and her American performer husband, Paul Howard Jenkins. Her parents moved to Toronto and divorced when she was 6 years old.

Her mother, Cleone Duncan, was a theatre actress who performed many years in the Canadian musical hit Anne of Green Gables – The Musical.

Early in her career she took classes with Lehman Engel, who had been a musical director for over 100 Broadway productions, in Toronto. In 1990, she was chosen along with 12 other participants to study with musical theatre composer and lyricist Stephen Sondheim at Oxford University. The sessions were organized by theatre producer Cameron Mackintosh.

== Career ==
Her musical The Boys are Coming Home was part of the American Music Theatre Project at North Western University and was showcased by the National Alliance of Musical Theatre in New York City. Theatre critic Richard Ouzanian says she is "the creator of some of the most sophisticated work on our stages". The Toronto Star has commented that her work is "beautifully crafted" and USA Today states she is a "major talent". She also wrote the Chalmers Award-winning The Happy Prince. She collaborated with Canadian playwright Norm Foster for the musicals The Last Resort and Ned Durango.

== Works ==
- A Meeting of Minds
- Feathers on the Page
- Ned Durango
- One Step Forward (formerly The Boys are Coming Home)
- The Greatest Gift
- The Happy Prince
- The House of Martin Guerre
- The Last Resort
- The Princess and the Handmaiden
- Harvest Moon Rising
- Moll
- The Gift of the Magi
- The Lancashire Lass
