= John Gielgud on stage and screen =

List of English actor's roles and awards

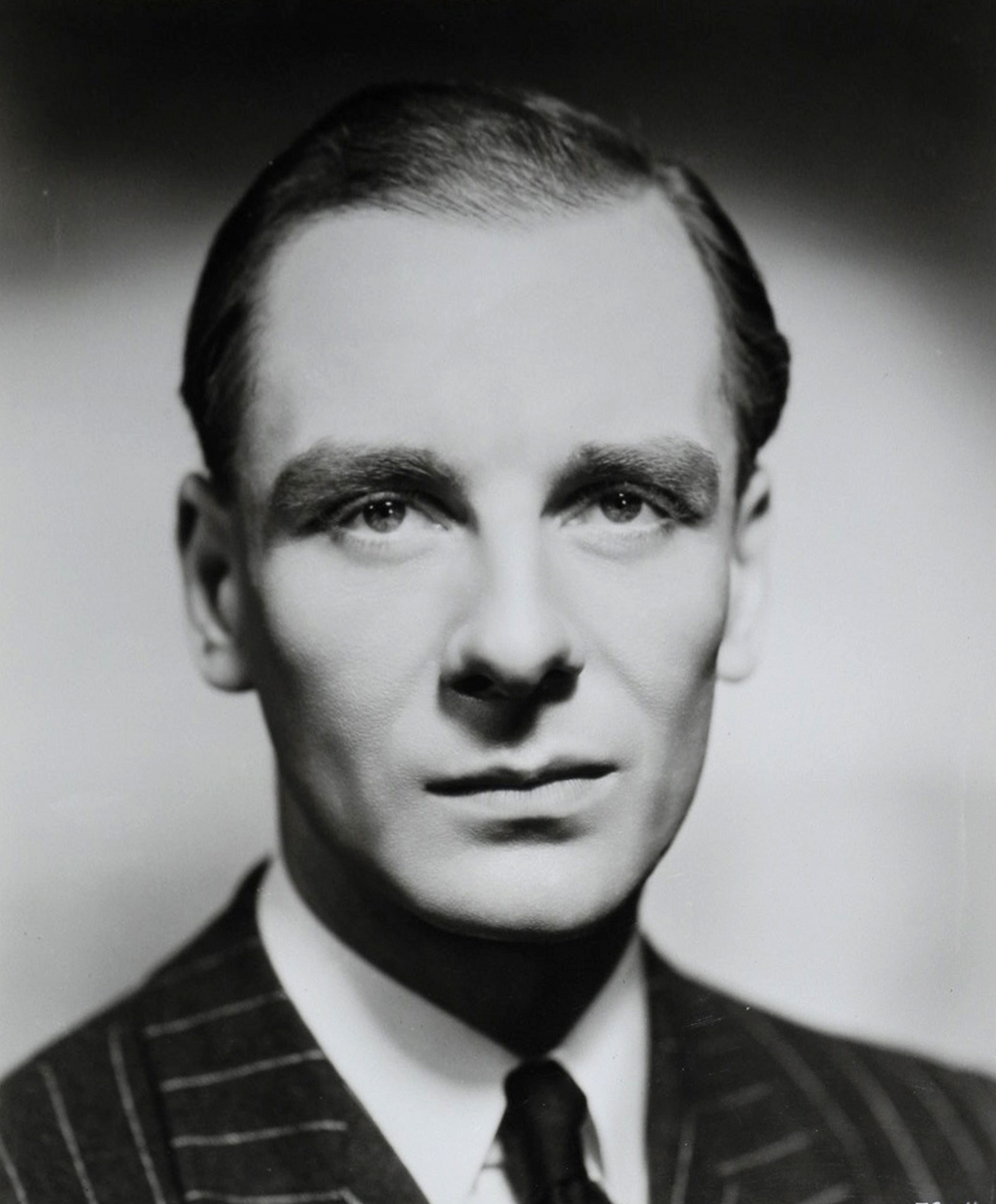
Gielgud in 1936

Sir John Gielgud (/ˈɡiːlɡʊd/ GHEEL-guud; 1904–2000) was an English actor and theatre director. He appeared on stage, television and radio and in film in a career that spanned eight decades. Film historian Brian McFarlane, writing for the British Film Institute, wrote of Gielgud that "in terms of the performing arts, it is no exaggeration to say that he towered over the century".

Gielgud, a member of the theatrical dynasty the Terry family, began working on stage in 1921 before attending the Royal Academy of Dramatic Art. After completing his studies he worked in repertory theatre and in the West End before establishing himself at the Old Vic in the 1930s. He continued working on the stage until 1990 both as a director and actor. Although he made some films early in his career, he did not start working regularly in the medium until he was in his sixties; in the course of just over thirty years between 1964 and 1998 he appeared in over sixty films. He was active on television and radio, appearing in numerous plays and interviews, and was also in demand as a narrator.

Gielgud is one of the few people who have received all four major annual American entertainment awards, these being an Oscar (for Arthur, 1981); an Emmy, (for Summer's Lease, 1991); a Grammy (for Ages of Man, 1979); and Tony Awards (for The Importance of Being Earnest, 1948; Ages of Man, 1959; Big Fish, Little Fish, 1961). He also won BAFTA Awards, (for Julius Caesar, 1953; Murder on the Orient Express, 1975) and Golden Globe Awards, (for Arthur and War and Remembrance, 1988). He was awarded with a BAFTA Fellowship in 1992 and a Laurence Olivier Special Award in 1985. Gielgud died on 21 May 2000, at the age of 96.

== Stage credits ==
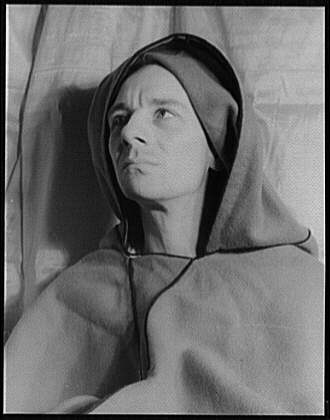
1936 portrait of Gielgud by Carl Van Vechten

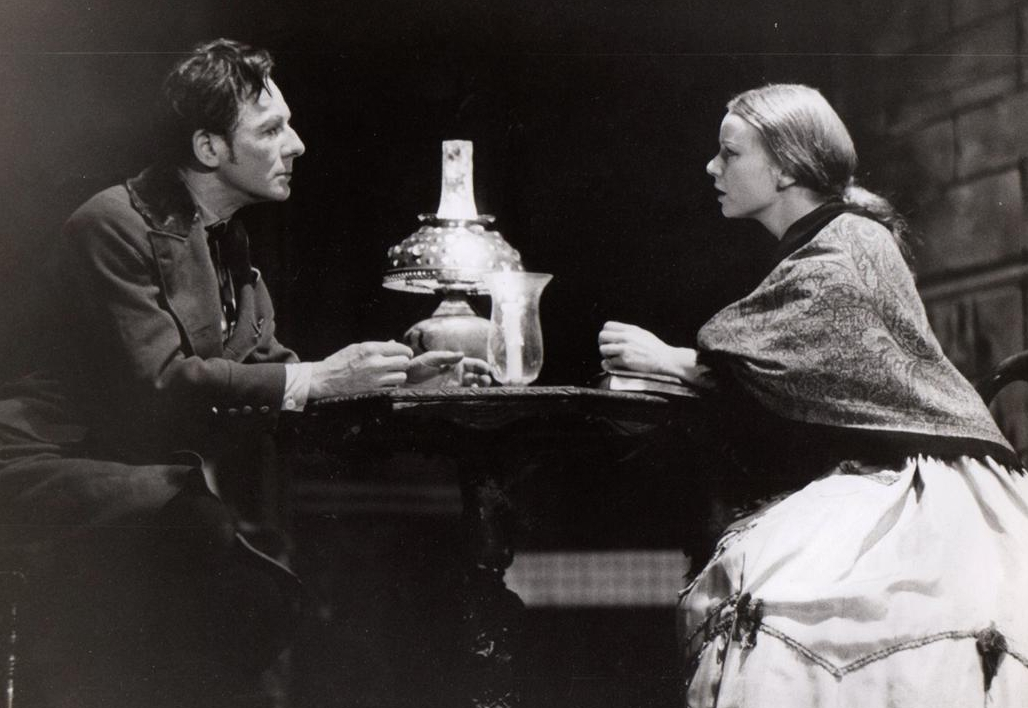
Gielgud and Dolly Haas in Crime and Punishment, Broadway, 1947

=== As actor ===
This table contains Gielgud's known professional theatrical roles. It also contains the occasions when he both acted and directed. It does not contain those productions where Gielgud was a director but did not appear on stage.

Gielgud's stage credits
Production	Date	Theatre (London, unless otherwise noted)	Role	Notes
Henry V	November 1921	The Old Vic	Herald	
King Lear	March 1922	The Old Vic	Walk on role	
Peer Gynt	March – April 1922	The Old Vic	Walk on role	
As You Like It	April 1922	The Old Vic	Walk on role	
Wat Tyler	April 1922	The Old Vic	Walk on role	
Love is the Best Doctor	April 1922	The Old Vic	Walk on role	
The Comedy of Errors	April 1922	The Old Vic	Walk on role	
The Wheel	September 1922	New Theatre Oxford, then touring	Lt. Manners	
The Masque of Comus	December 1922	Eton College	Younger Brother	
The Insect Play	May 1923	Regent Theatre	Felix, the Poet Butterfly	
Robert E. Lee	June 1923	Regent Theatre	Aide-de-camp	
Charley's Aunt	December 1923	Comedy Theatre	Charles Wykeham	
Captain Brassbound's Conversion	January 1924	Oxford Playhouse	Johnson	
Mr Pim Passes By	February 1924	Oxford Playhouse	Brian Strange	
Love for Love	February 1924	Oxford Playhouse	Valentine	
She Stoops to Conquer	February 1924	Oxford Playhouse	Young Marlowe	
Monna Vanna	February 1924	Oxford Playhouse	Prinzevalle	
Romeo and Juliet	April 1924	RADA Theatre	Count Paris	
Romeo and Juliet	May 1924	Regent Theatre	Romeo	
The Return Half	October 1924	RADA Theatre	John Sherry	
Candida	October 1924	Oxford Playhouse	Eugene Marchbanks	
Deirdre of the Sorrows	October 1924	Oxford Playhouse	Naoise	
A Collection will be Made	November 1924	Oxford Playhouse	Paul Roget	
Everybody's Husband	November 1924	Oxford Playhouse	A Domino	
The Cradle Song	November 1924	Oxford Playhouse	Antonio	
John Gabriel Borkman	November 1924	Oxford Playhouse	Erhart Borkman	
His Widow's Husband	November 1924	Oxford Playhouse	Zurita	
Madame Pepita	December 1924	Oxford Playhouse	Augusto	
French Leave	December 1924	Charterhouse	Lt. George Graham	
A Collection will be Made	January 1925	Oxford Playhouse	Paul Roget	
Smith	January 1925	Oxford Playhouse	Algernon Peppercorn	
The Cherry Orchard	January 1925	Oxford Playhouse	Peter Trofimov	
The Vortex	February 1925	Royalty Theatre	Understudy	
The Vortex	March 1925	Comedy Theatre	Nicky Lancaster	
The Nature of the Evidence	April 1925	RADA Players	Ted Hewitt	
The Orphan	May 1925	Aldwych Theatre	Castalio	
The Vortex	May 1925	Little Theatre	Nicky Lancaster	
The Cherry Orchard	May 1925	Lyric Theatre, Hammersmith	Peter Trofimov	
The High Constable's Wife	June 1925	Garden Theatre	Julien de Boys-Bourredon	
The Cherry Orchard	May 1925	Royalty Theatre	Peter Trofimov	
The Lady from the Sea	August 1925	Oxford Playhouse	A Stranger	
The Man with the Flower in His Mouth	August 1925	Oxford Playhouse	Title role	
The Two Gentlemen of Verona	September 1925	Apollo Theatre	Valentine	
The Seagull	October 1925	Little Theatre	Constantin Treplyov	
Doctor Faustus	October 1925	New Oxford Theatre	Good Angel	
Gloriana	December 1925	Little Theatre	Sir John Harrington	
L'École des cocottes	December 1926	Prince's Theatre	Robert	
Nativity Play	December 1925	Daly's Theatre	Second shepherd	
The Tempest	January 1926	Savoy Theatre	Ferdinand	Matinees only
Sons and Fathers	January 1926	RADA Theatre	Richard Southern	
Three Sisters	February 1926	Barnes Theatre	Baron Nikolaj Lvovich Tuzenbach	
Katerina	March 1926	Barnes Theatre	Georg Stibelev	
Hamlet	May 1926	Royal Court Theatre	Rosencrantz	
Romeo and Juliet	June 1926	London Coliseum	Romeo	Excerpt only
Henry VI	June 1926	Lyric Theatre, Hammersmith	Richard	Dramatised reading
The Lady of the Camellias	July 1926	Garrick Theatre	Armand Duval	
Confession	July 1926	Royal Court Theatre	Wilfred Marley	
The Constant Nymph	October 1926	New Theatre	Lewis Dodd	
Othello	April 1927	Apollo Theatre	Cassio	
The Good Old Days	April 1927	New Theatre	Boulter	
The Hectic Present	April 1927	New Theatre	Guest	
The Great God Brown	June 1927	Strand Theatre	Dion Anthony	
The Constant Nymph	October 1926	King's Theatre	Lewis Dodd	
The Patriot	January 1928	Majestic Theatre, New York	Tsarevitch	Broadway debut
Ghosts	March 1928	Wyndham's Theatre	Oswald	Matinees only
Ghosts	April 1928	Arts Theatre	Oswald	
Holding out the Apple	June 1928	Globe Theatre	Gerald Marlowe	
Prejudice	June 1928	Arts Theatre	Jacob Slovak	
The Skull	August 1928	Shaftesbury Theatre	Capt. Allenby	
The Lady from Alfaqueque	October 1928	Court Theatre	Felipe Rivas	
Out of the Sea	November 1928	Strand Theatre	John Martin	
The Seagull	January 1929	Arts Theatre	Constantin Treplyov	
Red Rust	February 1929	Little Theatre	Fedor	
Hunter's Moon	March 1929	Prince of Wales Theatre	Paul de Tressailles	
The Lady with a Lamp	April 1929	Garrick Theatre	Henry Tremayne	
Shall We Join the Ladies?	April 1929	Palace Theatre	Capt. Jennings	Matinees only
Red Sunday	June 1929	Arts Theatre	Bronstein	
Romeo and Juliet	September 1929	The Old Vic	Romeo	
The Merchant of Venice	October 1929	The Old Vic	Antonio	
The Imaginary Invalid	October 1929	The Old Vic	Cléante	
Romeo and Juliet	October 1929	The Old Vic	Romeo	Special performance
Richard II	November 1929	The Old Vic	Richard II	
Douaumont	December 1929	Prince of Wales Theatre	The Prologue	
A Midsummer Night's Dream	December 1929	The Old Vic	Oberon	
Julius Caesar	January 1930	The Old Vic	Mark Antony	
Romeo and Juliet	January 1930	Haymarket Theatre	Romeo	Matinees only
As You Like It	February 1930	The Old Vic	Orlando	
Androcles and the Lion	February 1930	The Old Vic	Emperor	
Macbeth	March 1930	The Old Vic	Macbeth	
The Man with the Flower in His Mouth	April 1930	The Old Vic	Title role	
Hamlet	April 1930	The Old Vic	Hamlet	
Hamlet	June 1930	Queen's Theatre	Hamlet	
The Importance of Being Earnest	July 1930	Lyric Theatre, Hammersmith	John Worthing	
Hamlet	July 1930	Smallhythe	Hamlet	Scene only
Henry IV, Part 1	September 1930	The Old Vic	Hotspur	
The Tempest	October 1930	The Old Vic	Prospero	
The Jealous Wife	November 1930	The Old Vic	Lord Trinket	
Richard II	November 1930	The Old Vic	Richard II	
Antony and Cleopatra	November 1930	The Old Vic	Mark Antony	
Twelfth Night	January 1931	Sadler's Wells Theatre	Malvolio	
The Tempest	February 1931	Sadler's Wells Theatre	Prospero	
Arms and the Man	February 1931	The Old Vic	Sergius Saranoff	
Much Ado About Nothing	March 1931	The Old Vic	Benedick	
King Lear	April 1931	The Old Vic	King Lear	
Shakespeare Birthday Festival	April 1931	The Old Vic	Hamlet	Scenes only
The Good Companions	May 1931	His Majesty's Theatre	Inigo Jollifant	
Much Ado About Nothing	July 1931	Smallhythe	Benedick	Scenes only
Musical Chairs	November 1931	Arts Theatre	Schindler	
The Good Companions	November 1931	Touring	Inigo Jollifant	
Musical Chairs	April 1932	Criterion Theatre	Schindler	
Shakespeare Birthday Festival	April 1932	The Old Vic	Richard II	Scenes only
Richard of Bordeaux	June 1932	New Theatre	Richard II	
Twelfth Night	July 1932	Smallhythe	Orsino	Scenes only
Musical Chairs	December 1932	Golders Green	Schindler	
Richard of Bordeaux	July 1933	New Theatre	Richard II	Also co-director
Richard II	July 1933	New Theatre	Richard II	Scenes only
A Kiss for Cinderella	December 1933	New Theatre	The Censor	Matinees only
Richard of Bordeaux	April 1934	Touring	Richard II	
The Maitlands	July 1934	Wyndham's Theatre	Roger Maitland	
Shakespeare Sonnets	July 1934	Smallhythe	Speaker	
Hamlet	November 1934	New Theatre	Hamlet	Also director
Richard of Bordeaux	April 1935	Touring	Richard II	
The Player's Masque	May 1935	Drury Lane	Mercury	Jubilee performance
Noah	July 1935	New Theatre	Noah	
Hamlet	July 1935	Smallhythe	Hamlet	Scenes only
Romeo and Juliet	October 1935	New Theatre	Mercutio/Romeo	Also director
Romeo and Juliet	April – May 1936	Touring	Romeo	Also director
The Seagull	May 1936	New Theatre	Boris Alexeyevich Trigorin	
Hamlet	September 1936	Royal Alexandra Theatre, Toronto	Hamlet	
Hamlet	October 1936	Empire Theatre, New York	Hamlet	
Hamlet	October 1936	St James' Theatre, New York	Hamlet	
Hamlet	February 1937	Shubert Theatre	Hamlet	
He was Born Gay	April 1937	Touring	Mason	Also director
He was Born Gay	May 1937	Queen's Theatre	Mason	
Nijinsky Matinee	May 1937	His Majesty's Theatre	Speaker	
Richard II	September 1937	Queen's Theatre	Richard II	
Richard II	November 1937	Golders Green Theatre	Richard II	
The School for Scandal	November 1937	Queen's Theatre	Joseph Surface	
King George's Pension Fund Matinee	December 1937	Winter Garden Theatre	Speaker	
Three Sisters	January 1938	Queen's Theatre	Aleksandr Ignatyevich Vershinin	
The Merchant of Venice	April 1938	Queen's Theatre	Shylock	Also director
Dear Octopus	September 1938	Manchester	Nicholas Randolph	
Dear Octopus	September 1938	Queen's Theatre	Nicholas Randolph	
The Importance of Being Earnest	January 1939	Globe Theatre	John Worthing	Also director
Shakespeare Birthday Festival	April 1939	The Old Vic	Hamlet	
Hamlet	June 1939	Lyceum Theatre	Hamlet	Also director
Hamlet	July 1939	Elsinore	Hamlet	Also director
The Importance of Being Earnest	August 1939	Globe Theatre	John Worthing	Also director
The Importance of Being Earnest	September 1939	Touring	John Worthing	Also director
Shakespeare in Peace and War	October 1939	Touring	Speaker	
The Beggar's Opera	March 1940	Haymarket Theatre	Macheath	
King Lear	April 1940	The Old Vic	King Lear	
The Tempest	May 1940	The Old Vic	Prospero	
Fumed Oak	July 1940	Globe/ENSA tour	Henry Gow	Also director
Hands Across the Sea	July 1940	Globe/ENSA tour	Peter Gilpin	Also director
Hard Luck Story	July 1940	Globe/ENSA tour	Old Actor	Also director
The Dark Lady of the Sonnets	August 1940	Edinburgh (ENSA)	Shakespeare	Also director
Dear Brutus	January 1941	Globe Theatre	Will Dearth	Also director
Dear Brutus	June 1941	Touring	Will Dearth	Also director
All Star Concert	December 1941	Royal Albert Hall	Speaker	
Macbeth	January 1942	Touring	Macbeth	Also director
Macbeth	July 1942	Piccadilly Theatre	Macbeth	Also director
The Importance of Being Earnest	October 1942	Phoenix Theatre	John Worthing	
The Way of the World	November 1942	New Theatre	Mirabell	Special Matinee
ENSA tour revue	December 1942	Gibraltar	Various	
The Doctor's Dilemma	January 1943	Haymarket Theatre	Louis Dubedat	
Love for Love	January 1943	Touring	Valentine	Also director
Love for Love	January 1943	Phoenix Theatre	Valentine	Also director
Hamlet	July 1944	Touring	Hamlet	
Love for Love	August 1944	Touring	Valentine	Also director
The Circle	September 1944	Touring	Arnold Champion-Cheney	
The Circle	October 1944	Haymarket Theatre	Arnold Champion-Cheney	
Love for Love	October 1944	Haymarket Theatre	Valentine	Also director
Hamlet	October 1944	Haymarket Theatre	Hamlet	Also director
A Midsummer Night's Dream	January 1945	Haymarket Theatre	Oberon	
The Duchess of Malfi	April 1945	Touring	Ferdinand	
The Duchess of Malfi	April 1945	Haymarket Theatre	Ferdinand	
Hamlet	October 1945	Touring: Far East (ENSA)	Hamlet	Also director
Blithe Spirit	October 1945	Touring: Far East (ENSA)	Charles Condomine	Also director
Shakespeare in Peace and War	October 1945	Touring: Far East (ENSA)	Speaker	
Crime and Punishment	June 1946	Touring	Rodion Romanovich Raskolnikov	
Crime and Punishment	June 1946	New Theatre	Rodion Romanovich Raskolnikov	
Macbeth	July 1946	Smallhythe	Reader	Reading only
Crime and Punishment	June 1946	Globe Theatre	Rodion Romanovich Raskolnikov	
The Importance of Being Earnest	January 1947	Touring (USA & Canada)	John Worthing	Also director
Love for Love	May 1947	Touring (USA)	Valentine	Also director
Medea	October 1947	Royale Theatre, New York	Valentine	Also director
Crime and Punishment	December 1947	Royale Theatre, New York	Rodion Romanovich Raskolnikov	
The Return of the Prodigal	December 1948	Globe Theatre	Eustace Jackson	
The Lady's Not for Burning	May 1949	Globe Theatre	Thomas Mendip	Also director
Henry IV	July 1949	Smallhythe	Hotspur	Scene only
Gala: Richard of Bordeaux	November 1949	London Coliseum	Richard II	
Measure for Measure	March 1950	Memorial Theatre, Stratford	Angelo	
Julius Caesar	May 1950	Memorial Theatre, Stratford	Cassius	
Much Ado About Nothing	June 1950	Memorial Theatre, Stratford	Benedick	Also director
King Lear	July 1950	Memorial Theatre, Stratford	King Lear	Also co-director
The Lady's Not for Burning	October 1950	Shubert Theatre	Thomas Mendip	Also director
The Lady's Not for Burning	November 1950	Royale Theatre, New York	Thomas Mendip	Also director
The Winter's Tale	June 1951	Phoenix Theatre	Leontes	
Ellen Terry Anniversary Performance	July 1951	Smallhythe	Speaker	
The Winter's Tale	August 1951	Touring	Leontes	
Salute to Ivor Novello	October 1951	London Coliseum	Speaker	
Much Ado About Nothing	January 1952	Phoenix Theatre	Benedick	Also director
Richard II	December 1952	Lyric Theatre, Hammersmith	Richard II	
The Way of the World	February 1953	Lyric Theatre, Hammersmith	Mirabell	Also director
Venice Preserv'd	May 1953	Lyric Theatre, Hammersmith	Jaffeir	
Richard II	July 1953	Royal, Bulawayo	Richard II	Also director
A Day by the Sea	November 1953	Haymarket Theatre	Julian Anson	Also director
King Lear	June 1955	Touring	Lear	
Much Ado About Nothing	July 1955	Palace Theatre	Benedick	Also director
King Lear	July 1955	Palace Theatre	Lear	
Much Ado About Nothing & King Lear	July 1955	Touring (Europe)	Benedick & Lear	Also director (Much Ado only)
King Lear	November 1955	Memorial Theatre, Stratford	Lear	
Much Ado About Nothing	December 1955	Memorial Theatre, Stratford	Benedick	Also director
Much Ado About Nothing	July 1956	Smallhythe	Benedick	Scene only
Nude with Violin	October 1956	Touring	Sebastien	Also co-director
Nude with Violin	November 1956	Globe Theatre	Sebastien	Also co-director
The Ages of Man	December 1956	Royal Festival Hall	Speaker	
The Tempest	August 1957	Memorial Theatre, Stratford	Prospero	
The Ages of Man	August 1957	Touring	Speaker	
The Tempest	December 1957	Drury Lane	Prospero	
The Potting Shed	February 1958	Globe Theatre	James Callifer	
Henry VIII	May 1958	The Old Vic, then touring	Cardinal Wolsey	
The Ages of Man	September 1958	Touring (America and Europe)	Speaker	
The Ages of Man	June 1959	Queen's Theatre	Speaker	
The Ages of Man	April 1960	Haymarket Theatre	Speaker	
The Last Joke	September 1960	Phoenix Theatre	Prince Cavanati	
The Ages of Man	September 1961	Memorial Theatre, Stratford	Speaker	
Othello	October 1961	Memorial Theatre, Stratford	Othello	
The Cherry Orchard	December 1961	Memorial Theatre, Stratford	Leonid Andreieveitch Gaev	
The Cherry Orchard	December 1961	Aldwych Theatre	Leonid Andreieveitch Gaev	
The Ages of Man	April 1962	Touring	Speaker	
The School for Scandal	October 1962	Haymarket Theatre	Joseph Surface	Also director
The School for Scandal	November 1962	Touring (USA)	Joseph Surface	Also director
The Ages of Man	January 1963	Majestic Theatre, New York	Speaker	
The Ages of Man	April 1963	Lyceum Theatre, New York	Speaker	
The Ides of March	July 1963	Touring	Caesar	Also co-director
The Ides of March	August 1963	Haymarket Theatre	Caesar	Also co-director
The Ages of Man	December 1963	Touring (Australia & New Zealand)	Speaker	
Hamlet	February 1964	O'Keefe Centre, Toronto	Voice of Ghost	Also director
Homage of Shakespeare	March 1964	New York/Princeton	Speaker	
Hamlet	March 1964	Shubert Theatre	Voice of Ghost	Also director
The Ages of Man	April 1964	Touring (UK & Europe)	Speaker	
Hamlet	July 1964	Lunt-Fontanne Theatre, New York	Voice of Ghost	Also director
Tiny Alice	December 1964	Billy Rose Theatre, New York	Julian	
The Ages of Man	March 1965	White House	Reader	
Ivanov	August 1965	Touring	Nikolai Ivanov	Also director
Ivanov	September 1965	Phoenix Theatre	Nikolai Ivanov	Also director
Ivanov	March 1966	Shubert Theatre	Nikolai Ivanov	Also director
The Ages of Man	October 1966	Norway	Speaker	
Men, Women and Shakespeare	November 1966	Touring (international)	Speaker	
Oedipus Rex	16 March 1967	Royal Festival Hall	Narrator	
The Ages of Man	June 1967	Ankara, Turkey	Speaker	
Tartuffe	November 1967	The Old Vic, then touring	Orgon	
Oedipus	March 1968	The Old Vic, then touring	Oedipus	
Forty Years On	October 1968	Apollo Theatre	Headmaster	
A Talent to Amuse	December 1969	Phoenix Theatre	Speaker	
The Battle of Shrivings	February 1970	Lyric Theatre	Sir Gideon Petrie	
Home	June 1970	Royal Court Theatre	Harry	
Home	July 1970	Apollo Theatre	Harry	
Home	November 1970	Morosco Theatre	Harry	
Caesar and Cleopatra	July 1971	Chichester	Caesar	
Veterans	March 1972	Royal Court Theatre	Sir Geoffrey Kendle	
The Tempest	March 1974	The Old Vic	Prospero	
Tribute To The Lady	May 1974	The Old Vic	Hamlet	
Bingo	August 1974	Royal Court Theatre	William Shakespeare	
No Man's Land	April 1975	The Old Vic	Spooner	
No Man's Land	July 1975	Wyndham's Theatre	Spooner	
Tribute To The Lady	February 1976	The Old Vic	Hamlet	
No Man's Land	April 1976	Lyttelton, Royal National Theatre	Spooner	
No Man's Land	November 1976	Longacre Theatre, New York	Spooner	
Julius Caesar	March 1977	Olivier, Royal National Theatre	Caesar	
Volpone	April 1977	Olivier, Royal National Theatre	Sir Politic Would-Be	
Half-Life	November 1977	Cottesloe, Royal National Theatre	Sir Noël Cunliffe	
Half-Life	March 1978	Duke of York's Theatre	Sir Noël Cunliffe	
Half-Life	January 1979	Touring	Sir Noël Cunliffe	
Gala Performance	February 1984	Duke of York's Theatre	Speaker	
Old Vic Tribute Dinner	May 1984	Marriott Hotel	Speaker	
The Best of Friends	January 1988	Apollo Theatre	Sir Sydney Cockerell	
A Tale of Two Cities	March 1988	Royalty Theatre	Voice only	
Royal Birthday Gala	July 1990	London Palladium	Compère	

=== As director ===
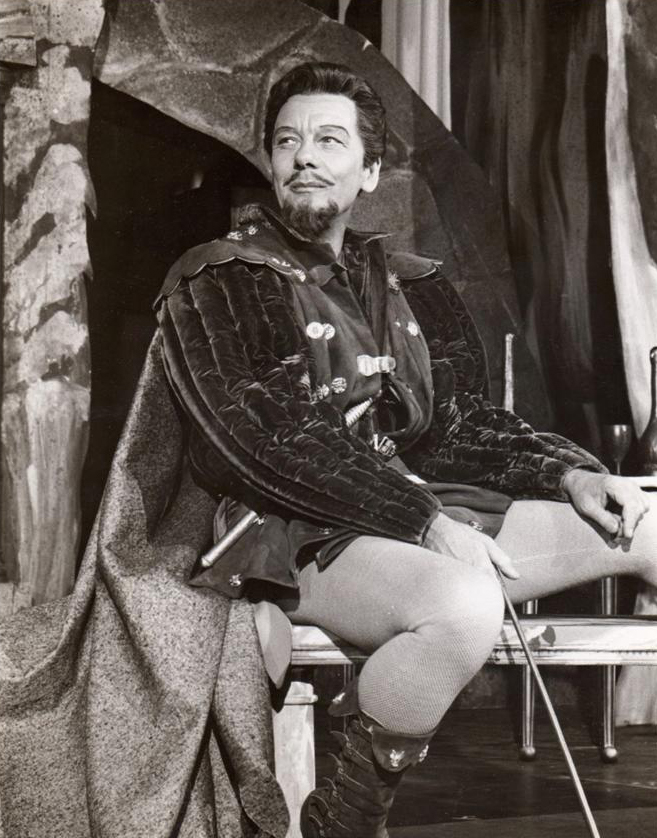
Gielgud as Benedick in Much Ado About Nothing, 1959

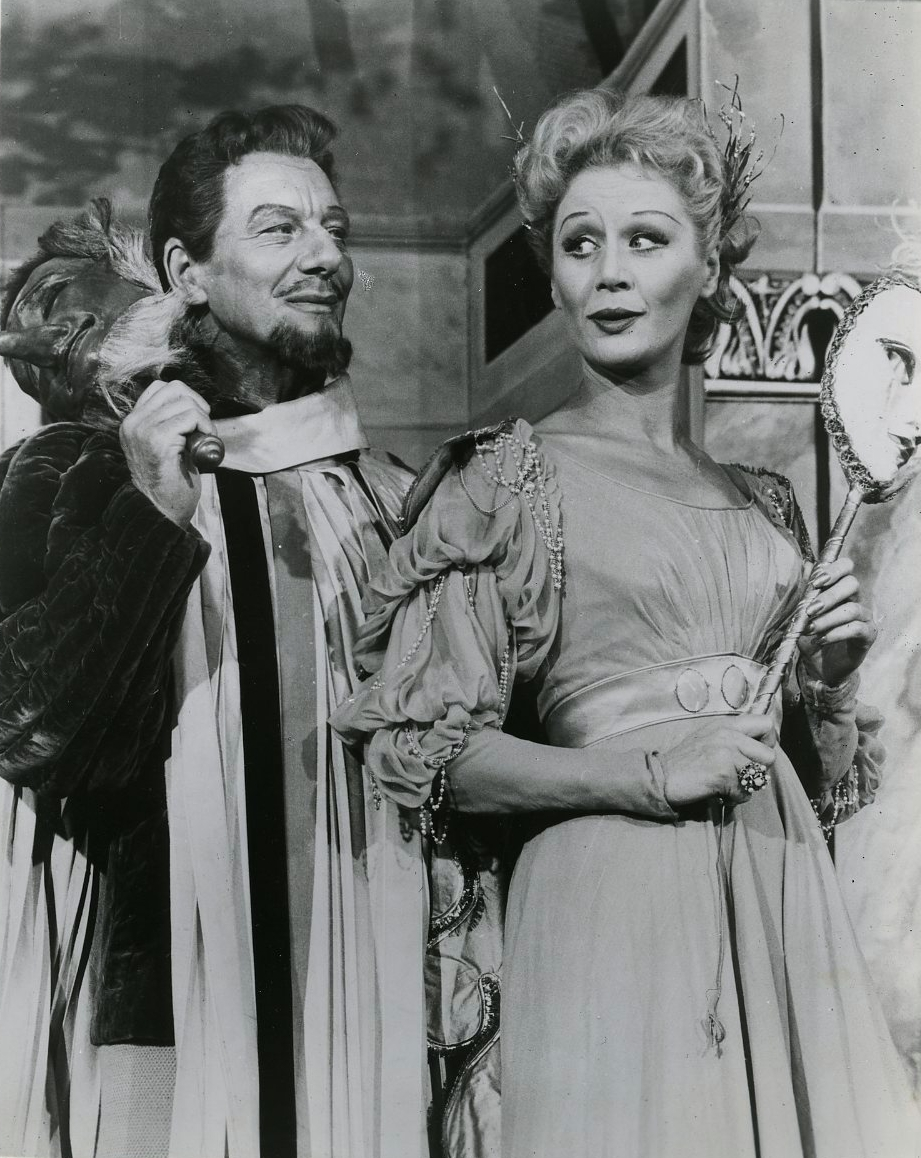
Gielgud and Margaret Leighton in Much Ado About Nothing.

This table contains Gielgud's stage work as a director. It does not include those productions in which he also appeared, which are shown in the table above.

Gielgud's director credits
Production	Date	Theatre (London, unless otherwise noted)
Romeo and Juliet	February 1932	New Theatre Oxford
Romeo and Juliet	March 1932	New Theatre
Strange Orchestra	September 1932	St Martin's Theatre
The Merchant of Venice	December 1932	The Old Vic
The Merchant of Venice	February 1933	Sadler's Wells Theatre
La voix humaine	July 1933	Ambassadors Theatre
Musical Chairs	August 1933	His Majesty's Theatre
Sheppey	September 1933	Wyndham's Theatre
Spring 1600	January 1934	Shaftesbury Theatre
Queen of Scots	June 1934	New Theatre
The Old Ladies	April 1935	New Theatre
Punch Cartoons	November 1935	His Majesty's Theatre
Spring Meeting	May 1938	Ambassadors Theatre
Spring Meeting	July 1938	Piccadilly Theatre
Scandal in Assyria	April 1939	Globe Theatre
Spring Meeting	May 1939	Brighton
The Beggar's Opera	March 1940	Haymarket Theatre
Ducks and Drakes	November 1941	Apollo Theatre
Nursery Slopes	July 1943	Touring
Landscape (Nursery Slopes)	October 1943	Westminster Theatre
The Cradle Song	January 1944	Apollo Theatre
The Last of Summer	June 1944	Lyric Theatre
Lady Windermere's Fan	August 1945	Haymarket Theatre
Lady Windermere's Fan	April 1947	His Majesty's Theatre
The Glass Menagerie	July 1948	Haymarket Theatre
Medea	September 1948	Globe Theatre
The Heiress	February 1949	Haymarket Theatre
Much Ado About Nothing	April 1949	Memorial Theatre, Stratford
Treasure Hunt	September 1949	Apollo Theatre
The Boy With a Cart	January 1950	Lyric Theatre, Hammersmith
Shall We Join the Ladies	January 1950	Lyric Theatre, Hammersmith
Indian Summer	December 1951	Criterion Theatre
Macbeth	March 1952	Memorial Theatre, Stratford
Charley's Aunt	December 1953	Touring
Charley's Aunt	November 1953	Haymarket Theatre
The Cherry Orchard	May 1954	Lyric Theatre, Hammersmith
Twelfth Night	April 1955	Memorial Theatre, Stratford
The Chalk Garden	April 1956	Haymarket Theatre
The Trojans	June 1957	Royal Opera House
Variation on a Theme	March 1958	Touring
Variation on a Theme	April 1958	Globe Theatre
Five Finger Exercise	July 1958	Comedy Theatre
The Complaisant Lover	June 1959	Globe Theatre
Much Ado About Nothing	September 1959	Boston/New York
Five Finger Exercise	December 1959	Music Box Theatre, New York
A Midsummer Night's Dream	February 1961	Royal Opera House
Big Fish, Little Fish	March 1961	ANITA Theatre, New York
Dazzling Prospect	June 1961	Globe Theatre
The School for Scandal	April 1962	Haymarket Theatre
Halfway Up the Tree	November 1967	Queen's Theatre
Don Giovanni	August 1968	London Coliseum
All Over	March 1971	Martin Beck Theatre, New York
Private Lives	September 1972	Queen's Theatre
The Constant Wife	September 1973	Albery Theatre
Private Lives	September 1974	46th Street Theatre
The Constant Wife	December 1974	Shubert Theatre, New York
The Gay Lord Quex	June 1975	Albery Theatre

== Radio plays ==
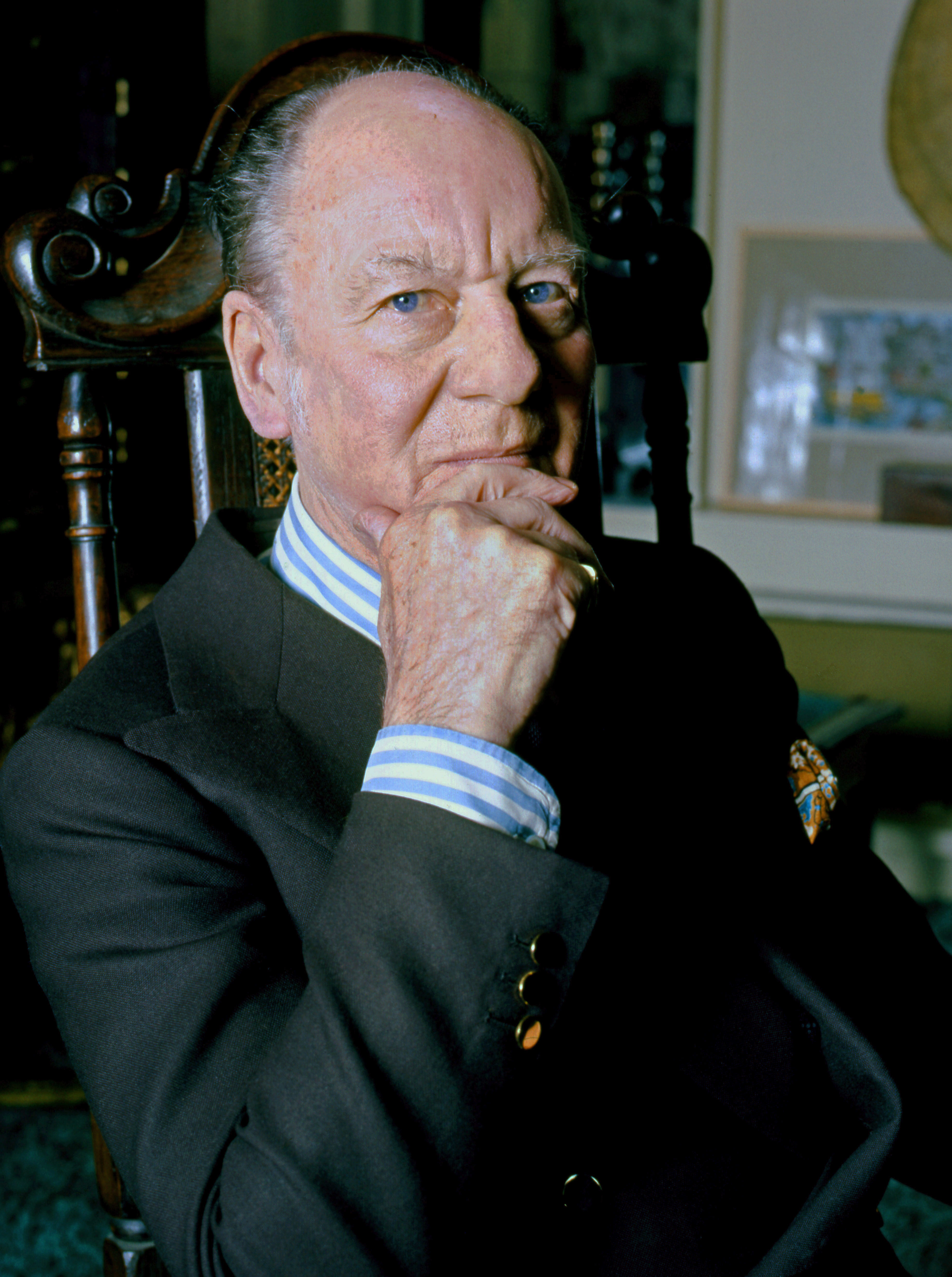
Gielgud in 1973, by Allan Warren

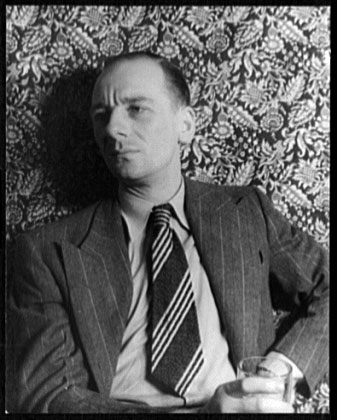
Gielgud in 1936

Gielgud took part in numerous radio broadcasts in his career, including interviews, poetry readings and talks about the theatre and acting. The following is a list of plays in which he was involved.

Radio plays of Gielgud
Play	Year
The Man with the Flower in His Mouth	1929
The Tempest	1931
Will Shakespeare	1931
Othello	1932
Hamlet	1932
The Tempest	1933
He was Born Gay	1937
The School for Scandal	1937
Present Laughter	1937
The Importance of Being Earnest	1939
Hamlet	1939
Hamlet	1940
The Laughing Woman	1940
The Importance of Being Earnest	1940
Prince of Bohemia	1941
King Lear	1941
The Return of Mr Oakroyd	1941
Richard of Bordeaux	1941
The Great Ship	1943
Suicide Club	1943
The Family Reunion	1948
Hamlet	1948
The Tempest	1948
Measure for Measure	1950
The Importance of Being Earnest	1951
The Cross and the Arrow	1951
King Lear	1951
Helena	1951
Richard of Bordeaux	1952
The Tempest	1953
Ivanov	1954
The Adventures of Sherlock Holmes	1954
Henry VIII	1954
Scheherazade	1955
Present Laughter	1956
The Browning Version	1957
Oedipus at Colonus	1959
The Way of the World	1960
Richard II	1961
Arms and the Man	1961
King Lear	1967
Forty Years On	1973
Mr Luby's Fear of Heaven	1975
Henry V	1976
Much Ado About Nothing	1976
Henry VIII	1977
The Winter's Tale	1981
Passing Time	1983
The Tempest	1989
Between Ourselves	1990
Tales My Father Taught Me	1990
The Best of Friends	1991
Hamlet	1992
Romeo and Juliet	1993
Laughter in the Shadow of Trees	1994
King Lear	1994

== Filmography ==
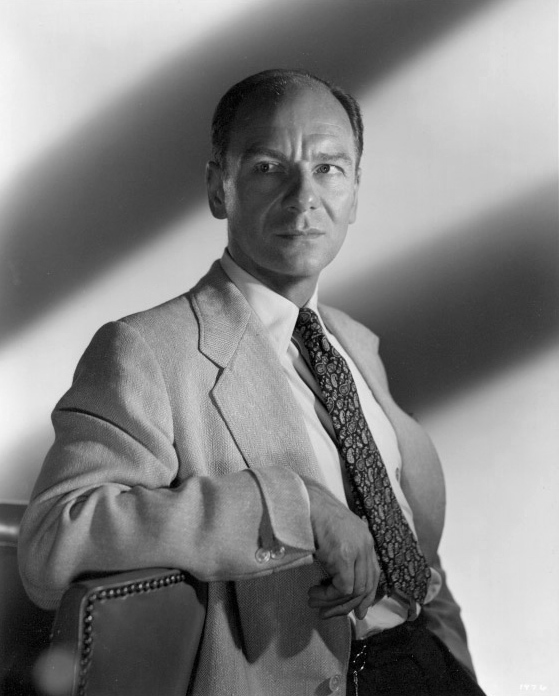
Publicity still of Gielgud for Julius Caesar (1953)

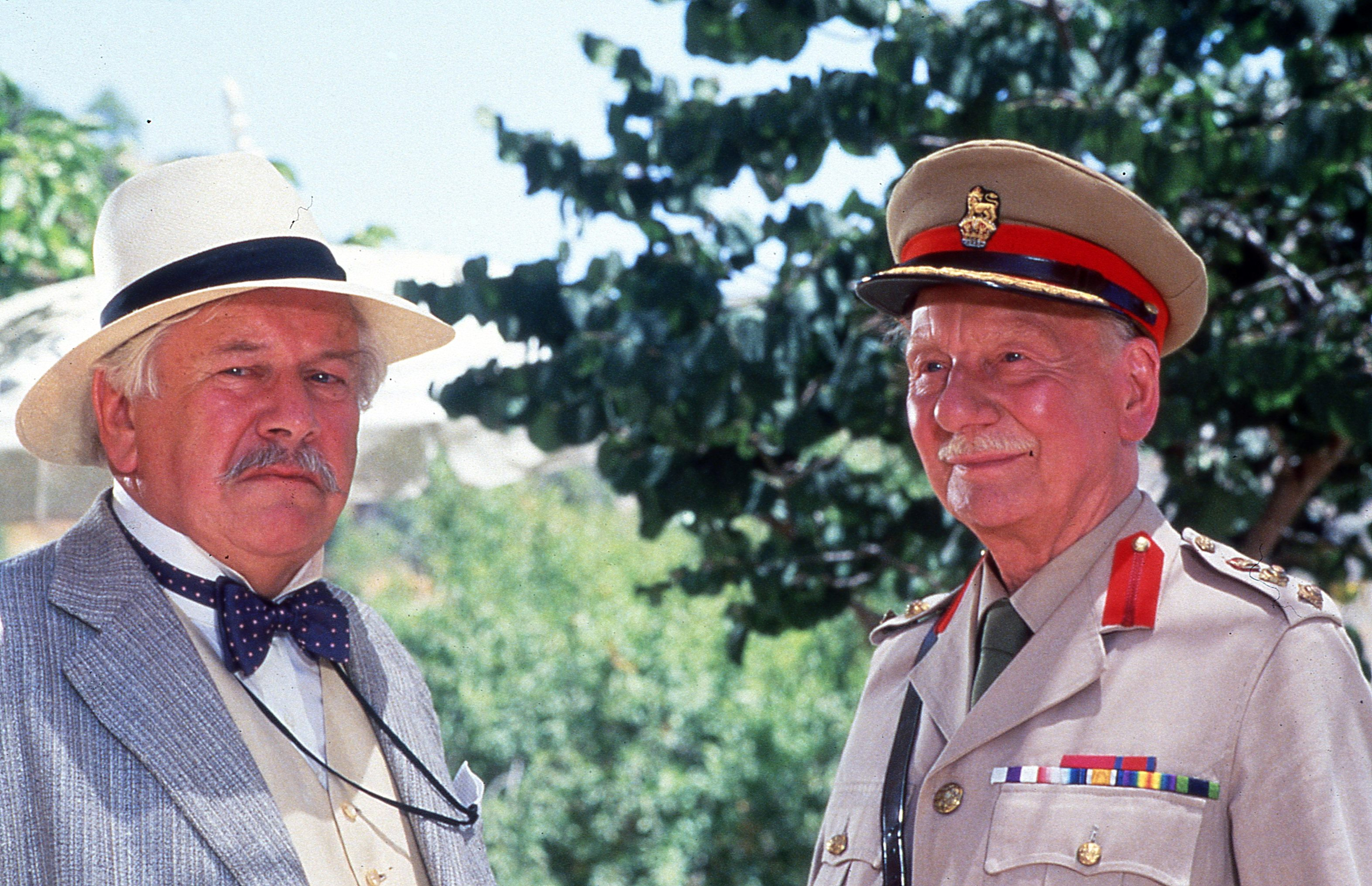
Gielgud (right) with Peter Ustinov in Appointment with Death (1988)

Filmography of Gielgud
Film	Year	Role	Ref.
Who Is the Man?	1924	Daniel	
The Clue of the New Pin	1929	Rex Trasmere	
Insult	1932	Henri Dubois	
The Good Companions	1933	Inigo Jollifant	
Secret Agent	1936	Richard Ashenden/Edgar Brodie	
The Prime Minister	1941	Benjamin Disraeli	
An Airman's Letter to His Mother	1941	Narrator	
Unfinished Journey	1944	Commentator	
Julius Caesar	1953	Cassius	
Romeo and Juliet	1954	The Prologue	
Richard III	1955	George, Duke of Clarence	
Around the World in 80 Days	1956	Foster	
Saint Joan	1957	Earl of Warwick	
The Barretts of Wimpole Street	1957	Edward Moulton-Barrett	
Becket	1964	King Louis VII	
Hamlet	1964	Voice of the Ghost	
The Loved One	1965	Sir Francis Hinsley	
Chimes at Midnight	1965	King Henry IV	
Assignment to Kill	1967	Curt Valayan	
Revolution D'Octobre	1967	Narrator	
The Shoes of the Fisherman	1968	Pope Pius XIII	
Sebastian	1968	Head of Intelligence	
The Charge of the Light Brigade	1968	Lord Raglan	
Oh! What a Lovely War	1969	Count Leopold von Berchtold	
Julius Caesar	1970	Julius Caesar	
Eagle in a Cage	1972	Lord Sissal	
Lost Horizon	1973	Chang	
11 Harrowhouse	1974	Meecham	
Murder on the Orient Express	1974	Beddoes	
Gold	1974	Farrell	
Galileo	1975	Cardinal	
Aces High	1976	Headmaster	
Caesar and Cleopatra	1976	Caesar	
Joseph Andrews	1976	Doctor	
A Portrait of the Artist as a Young Man	1977	Preacher	
Providence	1977	Clive Langham	
Richard II	1978	John of Gaunt	
Les Misérables	1978	Monsieur Gillenormand – Marius' grandfather	
Murder by Decree	1978	Lord Salisbury	
Caligula	1979	Nerva	
The Human Factor	1979	Brigadier Tomlinson	
The Orchestra Conductor	1980	Jan Lasocki	
The Elephant Man	1980	Carr Gomm	
Sphinx	1980	Abdu Hamdi	
The Formula	1980	Dr. Abraham Esau	
Lion of the Desert	1981	Sharif El Gariani	
Arthur	1981	Hobson	
Priest of Love	1981	Herbert G. Muskett	
Chariots of Fire	1981	Master of Trinity	
Gandhi	1982	Lord Irwin	
Buddenbrooks	1982	Narrator	
Scandalous	1983	Uncle Willie	
The Wicked Lady	1983	Hogarth	
The Scarlet and the Black	1983	Pope Pius XII	
Invitation to the Wedding	1983	Clyde Ormiston	
Wagner	1983	Pfistermeister	
The Shooting Party	1984	Cornelius Cardew	
Plenty	1985	Sir Leonard Darwin	
Romance on the Orient Express	1985	Charles Woodward	
Leave All Fair	1985	John M. Murray	
The Canterville Ghost	1985	Sir Simon de Canterville	
The Whistle Blower	1986	Sir Adrian Chapple	
Barbablú, Barbablú	1987	Bluebeard	
Appointment with Death	1988	Colonel Carbury	
Arthur 2: On the Rocks	1988	Hobson	
Getting it Right	1989	Sir Gordon Munday	
Prospero's Books	1991	Prospero	
Shining Through	1992	Konrad Friedrichs, "Sunflower"	
Swan Song	1992	Svetlovidov	
The Power of One	1992	Headmaster St. John	
First Knight	1995	Oswald	
Haunted	1995	Dr. Doyle	
The Portrait of a Lady	1996	Mr. Touchett	
Hamlet	1996	Priam	
Shine	1996	Professor Cecil Parkes	
Elizabeth	1998	The Pope	
Quest for Camelot	1998	voice of Merlin	
Sergei Rachmaninov: Memories	1999	Narrator	
Catastrophe	2000	Protagonist	

== Television ==
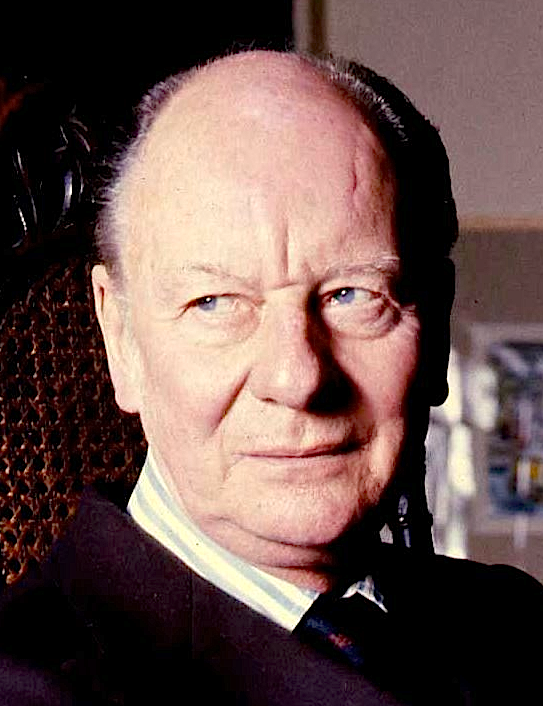
Gielgud, photographed by Allan Warren in 1973

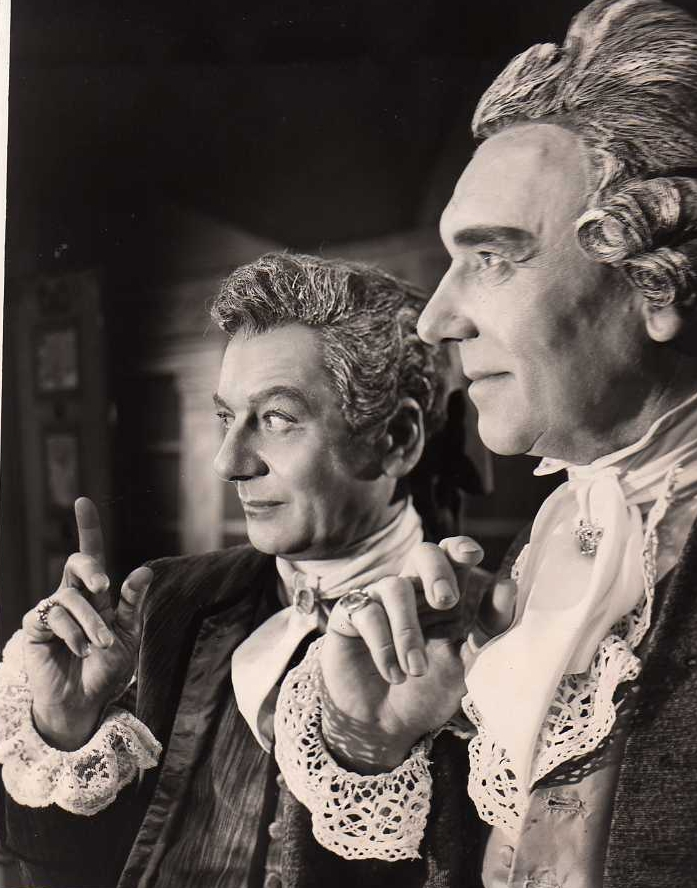
Gielgud (left) as Joseph Surface, and Ralph Richardson as Sir Peter Teazle, The School for Scandal, 1962

Television appearances of Gielgud
Programme	Date	Channel	Role
A Day by the Sea	31 March 1959	ITV	Julian Anson
DuPont Show of the Month: "The Browning Version"	23 April 1959	CBS (USA)	Andrew Crocker-Harris
The Cherry Orchard	13 April 1962	BBC TV	Leonid Andreyevich Gaev
Play of the Week: "The Rehearsal"	1 January 1963	ITV	The Count
The Wednesday Play: "The Mayfly and the Frog"	21 December 1966	BBC One	Gabriel Quantara
Alice in Wonderland	28 December 1966	BBC One	Mock Turtle
Play of the Month: "Romeo and Juliet"	3 December 1967	BBC One	Chorus
Star Performance: "From Chekhov with Love"	14 June 1968	ITV	Anton Chekhov
Play of the Month: "Saint Joan"	1 September 1968	BBC One	The Inquisitor
Omnibus: "The Actor's Changing Face"	25 May 1969	BBC One	Participant
Hallmark Hall of Fame: "Hamlet"	17 November 1970	NBC (USA)	Voice of the Ghost
Carol Channing's Mad English Tea Party	1971		
Hassan	1971		Harun al-Rashid
Play for Today: "Home"	6 January 1972	BBC One	Harry
Probe	21 February 1972	NBC (USA)	Streeter
This is Noël Coward	2 April 1973		Narrator
Menace: "Deliver us from Evil"	3 May 1973	BBC One	Frederick William Densham
Frankenstein: The True Story	30 November 1973	NBC (USA)	Chief Constable
Edward the Seventh	6 – 30 May 1975	ITV	Benjamin Disraeli
Shades of Greene: "Special Duties"	23 September 1975	ITV	Mr Ferraro
The Gift of the Magna Carter	1976		
Play of the Month: "The Picture of Dorian Gray"	19 September 1976	BBC One	Lord Henry Wotton
Personality and Learning: "The Grand Inquisitor"	10 April 1977	BBC	The Grand Inquisitor
Play of the Month: "Heartbreak House"	19 May 1977	BBC One	Captain Shotover
Night of 100 Stars	5 June 1977	ITV	
Omnibus: "Pure Radio"	3 November 1977	BBC One	
No Man's Land	3 October 1978	ITV	Spooner
Tales of the Unexpected: "Neck"	28 April 1979	ITV	Jelks
Soul of a Nation	5 January 1980	BBC	Narrator
The English Garden (eight episodes)	1980	ITV	Presenter
Every Night Something Atrocious	1980	ITV	
Why Didn't They Ask Evans?	30 March 1980	ITV	Reverend Thomas Jones
The British Greats: "Jack Hawkins"	30 March 1980	ITV	Interviewee
Tales of the Unexpected: "Parson's Pleasure"	30 November 1980	ITV	Cyril Boggis
Agatha Christie's Seven Dials Mystery	8 March 1981	ITV	Marquis of Caterham
Omnibus: "Parrots, Bees, Ducks and Finches"	7 April 1981	BBC One	
Paperbacks	29 April 1981	BBC	Interviewee
Brideshead Revisited	12 October – 24 November 1981	ITV	Edward Ryder
Marco Polo	1982		Doge of Venice
Hallmark Hall of Fame: "Hunchback of Notre Dame"	4 February 1982	NBC (USA)	
Inside the Third Reich	9 May 1982	ABC Television (USA)	Albert Speer Sr
Play of the Month: "The Critic"	23 August 1982	BBC One	Lord Burleigh
The South Bank Show: "Laurence Olivier – A Life"	17 October 1982	ITV	
Omnibus: "Old Vic"	30 October 1983	BBC One	
The Far Pavilions	3 – 5 January 1984	Channel 4	Cavagnari
All the World's a Stage: Makers of Magic	29 January 1984	BBC	
The Master of Ballantrae	16 April – 7 May 1984	ITV	Lord Durrisdeer
Ingrid	7 March 1984		Narrator
Six Centuries of Verse	2 May – 9 December 1984	ITV	Presenter
Camille	11 December 1984		The Duke
Frankenstein	27 December 1984	ITV	De Lacey
Olivier: A Kingdom for a Stage	22 February 1985	BBC	
Screen Two: "Time After Time"	26 January 1986	BBC Two	Jasper Swift
The Theban Plays by Sophocles: "Oedipus the King"	16 September 1986	BBC	Teiresias
The Theban Plays by Sophocles: "Antigone"	19 September 1986	BBC	Teiresias
Screen Two: "Quartermaine's Terms"	29 March 1987	BBC	Eddie Loomis
A Man for All Seasons	7 December 1988		Cardinal Wolsey
Money Talks	11 January 1993		Dreuther
The South Bank Show: "Hamlet"	2 April 1989	ITV	
War and Remembrance	3 – 24 September 1989	ITV	Aaron Jastrow
Summer's Lease	1 – 22 November 1989	BBC One	Haverford Downs
The South Bank Show: "Hindemith – A Pilgrim's Progress"	15 April 1990	ITV	Narrator
War and Remembrance	10 – 17 June 1990	ITV	Aaron Jastrow
A TV Dante	29 July – 1 August 1990	Channel 4	Virgil
The Best of Friends	28 December 1991	Channel 4	Sir Sydney Cockerell
The South Bank Show: "Noel Coward: A Profile"	3 January 1992	ITV	
Inspector Morse: "The Twilight of the Gods"	20 January 1993	ITV	Lord Hincksey
Lovejoy: "The Lost Colony"	27 December 1993	BBC One	Lord Wakering
Under the Hammer: "The Fatal Attribution"	10 January 1994	ITV	Hugo Lunt
The Inspector Alleyn Mysteries: "Hand In Glove"	10 January 1994	BBC One	Percival Pyke Period
Scarlett	13 November 1994	CBS (USA)	Pierre Robillard
Performance: Summer Day's Dream	26 November 1994	BBC	Stephen Dawlish
Haunted	19 February 1997		Dr. Doyle
Gulliver's Travels	7 April 1996	Channel 4	Professor of Sunlight
A Dance to the Music of Time	9 October 1997	Channel 4	St. John Clarke
The Tichborne Claimant	1998		Lord Chief Justice Cockburn
Merlin	26 April 1998	NBC (USA)	King Constant

== Sound recordings ==
Gielgud made numerous recordings of Shakespeare plays, including Hamlet, Henry V, Julius Caesar, Measure for Measure, Much Ado about Nothing, Othello, Richard II, Richard III and The Winter's Tale, along with his Shakespeare anthology The Ages of Man. There was also a commercial LP set of The Importance of Being Earnest featuring his famous Jack Worthing, and a series of Sherlock Holmes adaptations opposite Ralph Richardson as Dr. Watson.

== Awards and honours ==
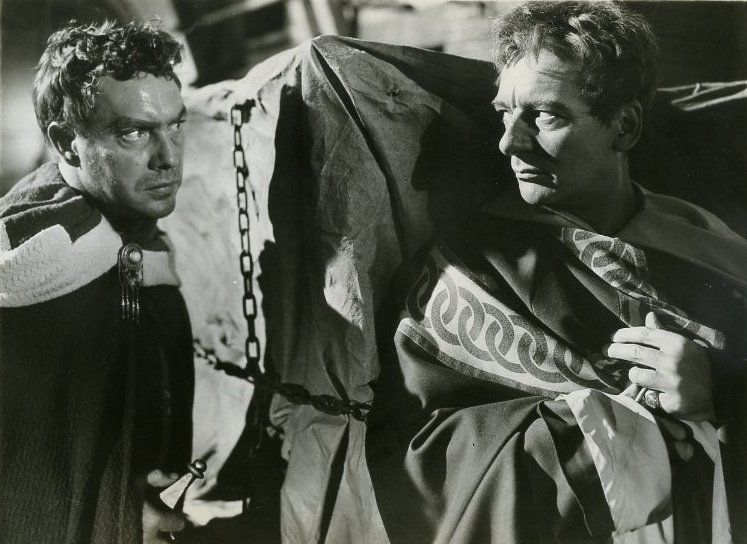
Edmond O'Brien (Casca, left) and Gielgud (Cassius) in Julius Caesar (1953), for which Gielgud won a BAFTA Award for Best British Actor.

Awards and honours presented to Gielgud
Film or Production	Year	Award	Category	Result	Ref.
The Importance of Being Earnest	1948	Tony Award	Outstanding Foreign Company	Honored	
Julius Caesar	1954	British Academy Film Award	Best British Actor	Won	
Ages of Man	1959	Tony Award	Special Tony Award (Note: The award was given "for contribution to theatre for his extraordinary insight into the writings of Shakespeare as demonstrated in his one-man play, Ages of Man".)	Honored	
Ages of Man	1960	Grammy Award	Best Broadway Show Album	Nominated	
Ages of Man	1960	Grammy Award	Best Performance – Documentary or Spoken Word (other than comedy)	Nominated	
Ages of Man, Vol. 2 (One Man in His Time)	1961	Grammy Award	Best Performance – Documentary or Spoken Word (other than comedy)	Nominated	
Big Fish, Little Fish	1961	Tony Award	Best Direction of a Play	Won	
The School for Scandal	1963	Tony Award	Best Direction of a Play	Nominated	
Becket	1965	Academy Award	Best Supporting Actor	Nominated	
Tiny Alice	1965	Tony Award	Best Actor in a Play	Nominated	
Home	1970	Evening Standard Award	Best Actor (Note: Co-winner with Ralph Richardson, also for Home)	Won	
Home	1971	Tony Award	Best Actor in a Play	Nominated	
Home	1971	Drama Desk Award	Outstanding Performance	Won	
No Man's Land	1975	Evening Standard Award	Best Actor	Won	
No Man's Land	1975	Drama Desk Award	Unique Theatrical Experience	Won	
Murder on the Orient Express	1975	British Academy Film Award	Best Actor in a Supporting Role	Won	
Providence	1977	New York Film Critics Circle Award	Best Actor	Won	
Half-Life	1978	Society of West End Theatre Awards	Actor of the Year in a New Play	Nominated	
Ages of Man (Readings from Shakespeare)	1980	Grammy Award	Best Spoken Word, Documentary or Drama Recording	Won	
Arthur	1981	New York Film Critics Circle Award	Best Supporting Actor	Won	
Arthur	1981	Los Angeles Film Critics Association Award	Best Supporting Actor	Won	
Arthur	1982	Golden Globe Award	Best Supporting Actor – Motion Picture	Won	
Arthur	1982	Academy Award	Best Supporting Actor	Won	
Arthur	1982	British Academy Film Award	Best Actor in a Supporting Role	Nominated	
Brideshead Revisited	1982	Primetime Emmy Award	Outstanding Supporting Actor in a Limited Series or Special	Nominated	
	1982	Evening Standard Award	Special Award	Won	
Brideshead Revisited	1982	British Academy Television Award	Best Actor	Nominated	
No Man's Land	1983	Grammy Award	Best Spoken Word, Documentary or Drama Recording (Note: Co-nomination with Ralph Richardson)	Nominated	
Old Possum's Book of Practical Cats	1984	Grammy Award	Best Spoken Word or Non-Musical Recording (Note: Co-nomination with Irene Worth)	Nominated	
The Master of Ballantrae	1984	Primetime Emmy Award	Outstanding Supporting Actor in a Limited Series or Special	Nominated	
	1985	Laurence Olivier Award	Society of London Theatre Special Award	Honored	
Romance on the Orient Express	1985	Primetime Emmy Award	Outstanding Supporting Actor in a Limited Series or Special	Nominated	
Plenty and The Shooting Party	1985	Los Angeles Film Critics Association Award	Best Supporting Actor	Won	
Plenty and The Shooting Party	1986	National Society of Film Critics Award	Best Supporting Actor	Won	
Plenty	1986	British Academy Film Award	Best Actor in a Supporting Role	Nominated	
Gulliver	1987	Grammy Award	Best Spoken Word or Non-Musical Recording	Nominated	
A Christmas Carol	1989	Grammy Award	Best Spoken Word or Non-Musical Recording	Nominated	
War and Remembrance (Parts I—VII)	1989	Golden Globe Award	Best Supporting Actor – Series, Miniseries or Television Film	Won	
War and Remembrance	1989	Primetime Emmy Award	Outstanding Lead Actor in a Miniseries or Special	Nominated	
War and Remembrance (Parts VIII—XII)	1990	Golden Globe Award	Best Actor – Miniseries or Television Film	Nominated	
Summer's Lease	1990	British Academy Television Award	Best Actor	Nominated	
Sir John Gielgud Reads Alice in Wonderland	1990	Grammy Award	Best Spoken Word or Non-Musical Recording	Nominated	
Summer's Lease	1991	Primetime Emmy Award	Outstanding Lead Actor in a Miniseries or Special	Won	
The Emperor's New Clothes	1992	Grammy Award	Best Album for Children	Nominated	
	1992	British Academy Film Award	BAFTA Fellowship	Honored	
	1994	The Imperial Family of Japan; The Japan Art Association	Praemium Imperiale	Honored	
Shine	1997	Actor Award	Outstanding Performance by a Cast in a Motion Picture	Nominated	
Shine	1997	British Academy Film Award	Best Actor in a Supporting Role	Nominated	

== Notes and references ==
Notes

== Bibliography ==
- Brandreth, Gyles (1994). John Gielgud, A Celebration. London: Pavilion Books. ISBN 978-1-85793-287-4.
- Croall, Jonathan (2000). Gielgud – A Theatrical Life, 1904–2000. London: Methuen. ISBN 978-0-413-74560-6.
- Croall, Jonathan (2011). John Gielgud: Matinee Idol to Movie Star. London: A & C Black. ISBN 978-1-4081-3106-0.
- Herbert, Ian (1978). Who's Who in the Theatre: a Biographical Record of the Contemporary Stage. London: Pitman Publishing. ISBN 978-0-273-01195-8.
- Morley, Sheridan (2001). John G – The Authorised Biography of John Gielgud. London: Hodder & Stoughton. ISBN 978-0-340-36803-9.
- Morley, Sheridan; Sharp, Robert (2004). "Gielgud, Sir (Arthur) John". Oxford Dictionary of National Biography (online ed.). Oxford University Press. doi:10.1093/ref:odnb/74146. (Subscription, Wikipedia Library access or UK public library membership required.)
- Somlyo, Roy (2001). The Tony Award: a complete listing of winners and nominees of the American Theatre Wing's Tony Award with a history of the American Theatre Wing. London: Heinemann. ISBN 978-0-325-00294-1.
- Who Was Who. London: A & C Black. 2012. (subscription required)
