= The House of Martin Guerre =

Musical by Leslie Arden and Anna Theresa Cascio

The House of Martin Guerre is a musical written by Leslie Arden (music, lyrics & co-book) and Anna Theresa Cascio (co-book). It is inspired by the 16th century French peasant Martin Guerre.

== Production history ==
It was first produced by Theatre Plus under the direction of Duncan McIntosh in Toronto (1993) at the Jane Mallett Theatre. It was then developed further by the Canadian theatrical producer Livent and went on to be produced by Chicago's Goodman Theatre in 1996. It was directed by David Petrarca. Variety said the show was “so fresh, so resoundingly complete and rewarding, that there is talk her first major show may yet land on Broadway”.

In 1997, it was once again produced in Toronto by the Canadian Stage Company again directed by David Petrarca.

In 2018, it was performed in concert at the Charlottetown Festival in Prince Edward Island, starring Adam Brazier, Joseé Boudreau, Rebecca Poff and Craig Fair. Narration was provided by Julain Molnar, who originated the role of Bertrande.

== Awards ==
Year	Award	Category	Nominee	Result
1994	Dora Mavor Moore Award	Best New Musical		Won
1996	Jefferson Award	Best Musical		Won
1996	Jefferson Award	Best Musical Director	David Petrarca	Won
1996	Jefferson Award	Best Principal Actor	Anthony Crivello	Won
1996	Jefferson Award	Best Supporting Actor	Kevin Gudahl	Won
1996	Jefferson Award	Best Supporting Actress	Hollis Resnik	Won
1996	Jefferson Award	Best Musical Direction	Jeffrey Klitz	Won
1996	Jefferson Award	Best Costume Design	Susan Hilferty	Nominated
1996	Jefferson Award	Best Lighting Design	James F. Ingalls	Nominated
1997	Chalmers Award		Leslie Arden	Nominated
