= American Music Theatre Project =

Northwestern University organization

Coordinates: 42°03′07″N 87°40′23″W

The American Music Theatre Project (AMTP) is a project at Northwestern University that associates the faculty and students at Northwestern with professional working artists of the music theatre to develop new musicals. It was founded in 2005.

== History ==
In 2022 AMTP announced Alexander Gemignani as its new artistic director.

== Musicals Produced ==
- Was (October 28 – November 13, 2005): Music by Joe Thalken, Book and lyrics by Barry Kleinbort, Based on the novel by Geoff Ryman, Directed by Tina Landau; Barber Theater
- Paradise Lost (February 11–12, 2006): Composed and conducted by Eric Whitacre; Pick Staiger Concert Hall
- Edges (June 22–25, 2006): By Benj Pasek & Justin Paul; Directed by Travis Greisler; Louis Theater
- The Boys Are Coming Home (Opened July 28, 2006): Music and lyrics by Leslie Arden; Book by Berni Stapleton; Inspired by an idea from Timothy French; Directed by Gary Griffin; Barber Theater
- Asphalt Beach (October 27–November 12, 2006): Music and lyrics by Andrew Lippa; Book by T.C. Smith and Peter Spears; Directed by Amanda Dehnert; Louis Theater
- In The Bubble (July 27–August 12, 2007): Music and lyrics by Michael Friedman and Joe Popp; Book by Rinne Groff; Directed by Michael Greif; Barber Theater
- Time After Time (November 13, 2007): Book and Lyrics Stephen Cole; Music Jeffrey Saver; Directed by Philip Markle; Louis Theater
- Dangerous Beauty (July 25 – August 17, 2008 ): Book by Jeannine Dominy; Lyrics by Amanda McBroom; Music by Michele Brourman; Directed by Sheryl Kaller; Barber Theater
  - Adapted from the screenplay The Honest Courtesan written by Jeannine Dominy, released as the film Dangerous Beauty Inspired by the scholarly book The Honest Courtesan by Margaret Rosenthal
- Moby Dick: An American Opera (November 24, 2008): Book and lyrics Mark St. Germain; Music by Doug Katsaros; Directed by Geoff Button; Wallis Theater
- Next Thing You Know (February 20–22, 2009): Music Joshua Salzman; Lyrics Ryan Cunningham; Directed by David Bell; Struble Theater
- Girls vs. Boys (July 10–August 2, 2009): Music by Kevin O'Donnell; Book and lyrics by Chris Mathews, Jake Minton and Nathan Allen; Choreography by Tommy Rapley; Directed by Nathan Allen; Wallis Theater
  - Developed in Association with The House Theatre of Chicago
- A Doctor in Spite of Himself (August 8, 2009): Musical comedy based on Le Medicin malgre lui by Molière; Book Jean-Baptiste Poquelin; English adaptation, score and additional dialogue Sheldon Harnick; Directed by Dominic Missimi; Barber Theater
- Ace (September 25–27, 2009): Book & Lyrics Robert Taylor and Richard Oberacker; Directed by David H. Bell; Wallis Theater
- Not Wanted on The Voyage (July 16 – August 8, 2010): Music and lyrics by Neil Bartram; Book by Brian Hill; Based on the novel by Timothy Findley; Directed by Amanda Dehnert; Barber Theater
- Fly By Night: A New Musical (February 14–27, 2011): Directed by Bill Fennelly; Struble Theater
  - In association with TheatreWorks Silicon Valley
- Painted Alice: A New Musical (March 3 – 13, 2011): Music and Lyrics by Michael Mahler; Book by Bill Donnelley; Directed by David H. Bell
- Hero (September 5–18, 2011): Music and Lyrics by Michael Mahler; Book by Aaron Thielen; Directed by Jess McLeod; Struble Theater
- Triangle (September 19–October 2, 2011): Music by Curtis Moore, Lyrics by Thomas Mizer, Book by Thomas Mizer, Curtis Moore and Joshua Scherer; Directed by Meredith McDonough; Struble Theater
- The Verona Project (October 19–November 4, 2012): Written and Directed by Amanda Dehnert; Louis Theater
- Found (May 29–31, 2013): By Hunter Bell, Lee Overtree and Eli Bolin; Directed by Lee Overtree; Wallis Theater
- Mr. Chickee's Funny Money (July 29 – August 9, 2013): Based on the book by Christopher Paul Curtis; Book by David Ingber; Music and Lyrics by Lamont Dozier and Paris Dozier; Directed by Derrick Sanders; Wallis Theater
- The Rules of Love (March 12, 2013; March 4–9, 2014): Music by Demir Demirkan and Sertab Erener; Lyrics and Book by David H. Bell; Directed by David H. Bell; Wallis Theater
- The Legend of New York (May 18–30, 2014): Music by Joshua Salzman Lyrics and Book by Ryan Cunningham Directed by John Simpkins; Wallis Theater
- Scrooge In Love!: Book by Duane Poole Music by Larry Grossman Lyrics by Kellen Blair Directed by Geoff Button WORKSHOP: November 13–23, 2014 | Wallis Theater PREMIERE: 2016 | Eureka Theatre
- The Proxy Marriage (2017)
- The Woman in Question (November 29–December 6, 2017): directed by Ryan Cunningham
- Picture Perfect (February 3–10, 2018): directed by Scott Evans
- Marie in Tomorrowland (February 17–24, 2018): Directed by Sam Pinkleton
- [re: CLICK] (June 18–30, 2021)
