= Don Pedro (Much Ado About Nothing) =

Character in Much Ado About Nothing

- Much Ado About Nothing character
- Created by: William Shakespeare
- Portrayed by: Denzel Washington; Ivar Kants; Reed Diamond; Michael Boatman; Peter Guinness

In-universe information
- Family: Don John (illegitimate brother)

Don Pedro, Prince of Aragon, is a fictional character from William Shakespeare's play Much Ado About Nothing. In the play, Don Pedro is a nobleman who visits his friend Leonato in Messina, Italy, after a successful military conquest. Don Pedro helps Claudio to woo Hero and helps set up Benedick and Beatrice who together form the two key couples in the play.

Don Pedro is considered a stable middleman in the story, providing counsel for Claudio and Benedick as well as conversing with Leonato. However, Don Pedro also experiences some dramatic irony: For example, he is deceived by his brother Don John's plot to frame Hero as unchaste.

Don Pedro has been portrayed by Denzel Washington in the Samuel Goldwyn Company 1993 film Much Ado About Nothing. He was played by Reed Diamond in Joss Whedon's interpretation of the play, which was released in 2012.

== Origins ==
A potential source of the character of Don Pedro is King Piero d'Aragona from Bandello's twenty-second novella. In the novella, the favourite of King Piero woos a young woman named Fenicia. This parallels how Don Pedro's favourite, Claudio, pursues a young woman, Hero. King Piero, in the Bandello story, was based on the historical figure Peter III of Aragon who became King of Sicily in 1282 after the violent uprising of the Sicilian Vespers.

Much Ado About Nothing was written while Messina, in Sicily, was part of the Spanish Kingdom of Aragon. Hence Don Pedro's presence in Italy despite being a Spanish Prince.

In many editions, Don Pedro is referred to in his speech prefixes simply as "Prince".

=== Name meaning ===
The name Pedro is the Spanish version of the name Peter. Don is a Spanish honorific that was reserved for Spanish royalty.

Though he is called Pedro in the speech prefixes, Don Pedro is introduced as Don Peter in both the Folio and first quarto editions.

== Role in the play ==
Much Ado About Nothing begins with Leonato announcing that Don Pedro, Prince of Aragon, is coming to Messina. Don Pedro arrives with Benedick, Claudio, and his bastard brother, Don John. Leonato invites Don Pedro and company to stay with him and his family. Don Pedro resolves to help Claudio woo Leonato's daughter Hero by disguising himself as Claudio.

At the party, Don Pedro woos Hero on Claudio's behalf, but Don John convinces Claudio that Don Pedro betrayed him and wooed Hero for himself. After Claudio's misunderstanding is resolved and he and Hero are engaged, Don Pedro offers marriage to Beatrice who quickly turns him down. After Beatrice and Benedick leave the party, Don Pedro hatches a plan to trick Beatrice and Benedick into falling in love with each other. Don Pedro, Leonato, and Claudio discuss how Beatrice is in love with Benedick in front of a hiding Benedick to gull him into loving her.

Don John tricks Don Pedro and Claudio into thinking Hero has been unfaithful to Claudio, who, with the support of Don Pedro, accuses Hero at their wedding. Even after hearing that Hero has supposedly died, Don Pedro supports Claudio and condemns Hero for being dishonourable. Dogberry reveals Don John's lies to Don Pedro and Claudio. The next day, Don Pedro's original scheme works out and Beatrice and Benedick are married. Benedick tells Don Pedro that he should "Get [himself] a wife".

== Analysis ==
Don Pedro's goodness serves to balance out the Don John's wickedness. Many critics contrast Don Pedro's well-intentioned deceptions, both of Beatrice and Benedick and of Hero, with Don John's bitter and malicious deception of Claudio and Don Pedro.

He tells Beatrice "Your silence most offends me."

In Janice Hayes's reading of Much Ado About Nothing, Claudio regards Don Pedro as a father figure; Claudio is thus afraid of engaging in "oedipal competition" with him over Hero.

There has been some debate as to the meaning of Hero's line, about Don Pedro, "Why then, your visor should be thatched". A. G. Newcomer interprets this line to refer to Don Pedro's baldness. Hilda Hulme interprets "thatch" to possibly refer to pubic hair rather than head hair. Others, such as Joost Daalder, follow Hulme's reading. Another possibility is that this line refers to Don Pedro's lack of a beard. It is additionally possible that this line refers to Don Pedro's mask being overly ornate and is a suggestion from Hero that his mask should be more humbly decorated. Contrarily, the mask itself could be lacking hair. In any case, the line is a put-down of Don Pedro.

== Performance history ==
=== Theatre ===
==== Asia ====
In the 1979’s Karasawagi, a Japanese language production of Much Ado About Nothing in Tokyo, the characters were given Japanese names. Don Pedro became Hyodo. The production was set during the Meji-era and Hyodo was depicted as having anti-Meji sentiments.

In 1986 in Shanghai, China, Much Ado About Nothing was adapted into Huangmei opera and featured Wang Shaofang as Don Pedro.

==== Australia ====
In 1996, Ivar Kants played Don Pedro in the Bell Shakespeare Company’s production, which toured Australia. In 2006, Donald Sword played Don Pedro with Shakespeare by the Sea in Sydney, Australia.

==== Europe ====
In 2006, Nicholas Ofczarek played Don Pedro in the German language production, Viel Lärm um nichts, at the Burgtheater in Austria. Don Pedro was referred to as "Prinz Pedro" and wore a "goldensten Trainingsanzug" (most golden tracksuit).

Robert Beyer played both Don Pedro and Don John in Viel Lärm um nichts in 2013 at the Schaubühne theatre in Berlin, Germany. For part of the performance, Don Pedro is dressed as Kermit the Frog.

===== UK =====
At the National Theatre Company, Don Pedro has been performed by Derek Jacobi (1967) in a production that was also filmed for television. Julian Wadham portrayed Don Pedro also at the National in 2007 in Nicholas Hytner's production set in 19th century Italy.

At the Royal Shakespeare Company, Don Pedro has been portrayed by Norman Rodway (1968), Jeffery Dench (1971), Robin Ellis (1976), Derek Godfrey (1982), David Lyon (1988), John Carlisle (1990), Clive Wood (2002), Patrick Robinson (2006), Shiv Grewal (2012), and John Hodgkinson (2014), though the show was referred to as Love’s Labour’s Won. The 1988 performance featuring David Lyon's Don Pedro was set during World War II; Don Pedro and company arrived in Messina via helicopter. Clive Wood's 2002 Don Pedro was described as "nervously enthusiastic, well turned-out, and slightly camp" upon his arrival at Messina. Shiv Grewal's 2012 Don Pedro was just returning from a peace-keeping mission with the UN.

At Shakespeare's Globe in London, the role of Don Pedro has been performed by Ewan Stewart (2011) and Steve John Shepherd (2017).

In 2005, Charles Edwards played Don Pedro in Peter Hall's production at the Theatre Royal, Bath. Edwards' Don Pedro has a "homosexual fixation with Claudio" which explained his willingness to believe Hero's unfaithfulness and thus prevent Claudio from marrying. Edwards later went on to play Benedick in Much Ado in 2011 at Shakespeare's Globe.

In 1993, Jack Ellis played Don Pedro at the Queen's Theatre in London. James Garnon played Don Pedro in Mark Rylance's 2013 production at The Old Vic in London. Adam James played Don Pedro in Josie Rourke's 2011 production at the Wyndham Theatre. Don Pedro has also been portrayed by Peter Guinness in 2018’s production of Much Ado About Nothing at the Rose Theatre in Kingston, directed by Simon Dormandy. In Simon Dormandy's Much Ado, Don Pedro and company were members of the mafia.

==== North America ====
===== Canada =====
At the Stratford Festival in Stratford, Ontario, Don Pedro has been portrayed by William Hutt (1958), Eric Donkin (1971), Lewis Gordon (1977), Jim McQueen (1980), John Franklyn-Robbins (1983), Edward Atienza (1987), Leon Pownall (1991), James Blendick (1998), Shane Carty (2006), and Juan Chioran (2012). In 2020, André Sills will play Don Pedro at Stratford. The 1998 Stratford performance featured James Blendick's Don Pedro in an imagined scene where Pedro and Claudio stood outside Hero's window and heard Margaret singing a song associated with Hero. This production attempted to rationalize and explain Don Pedro and Claudio's deception and subsequent shaming of Hero.

At Bard on the Beach in Vancouver, British Columbia, Don Pedro has been played by Dean Paul Gibson in 1996, Gerry Mackay in 2004, and Ian Butcher in 2017. Butcher's Don Pedro was a famous film director visiting Leonato's film studio.

Elsewhere in Canada, Don Pedro has been portrayed by Matt Burgess with Shakespeare on the Saskatchewan in 2004 in Saskatoon, Saskatchewan; Ross Neill at the St. Lawrence Shakespeare Festival in Prescott, Ontario in 2006; and Nathan Bender in 2006 with Shakespeare by the Sea in Halifax, Nova Scotia. In 2019, Christopher Morris played Don Pedro, whose name had been modernized to Don Peter, at the High Park Amphitheatre in Toronto, Ontario.

===== United States =====
At the Oregon Shakespeare Festival in Ashland, Oregon, Don Pedro has been performed by Allen Fletcher (1952), Richard Graham (1958), Ray Keith Pond (1965), Will Huddleston (1971), Larry R. Ballard (1976), and Peter Macon (2009).

At the Colorado Shakespeare Festival in Boulder, Colorado, Don Pedro has been played by Joseph F. Musikar (1977), Barry Kraft (1990), John Pasha (1997), and Frank J. Mihelich (2003).

At the Idaho Shakespeare Festival in Boise, Idaho, Don Pedro has been portrayed by Doug Copsey (1981), Kevin Connell (1989), and Douglas Frederick (2002).

With the Marin Shakespeare Company in California, Don Pedro has been portrayed by Mark Hurty in 1995 and Michael Wiles in 2002.

In 2005, James Denvil played Don Pedro at the Folger Theatre. This production, directed by Nick Hutchison, transformed the Spanish Don Pedro into an American officer.

At the American Shakespeare Centre in Staunton, Virginia, Don Pedro has been played by Gregory Jon Phelps in 2012 and Josh Innerst in 2015.

At the Old Globe in San Diego, California, Don Pedro has been portrayed by Donald Carrier in 2011 and Michael Boatman in 2018.

In 2019, Billy Eugene Jones played Don Pedro in an all-black production of Much Ado About Nothing directed by Kenny Leon at Shakespeare in the Park in New York City. This production was later broadcast on television as part of PBS's “Great Performances”.

Elsewhere in America, Don Pedro has been played by Peter Rini at the Shakespeare Theatre Company in Washington, DC (2002); Ron Heneghan in 2004 at the Pennsylvania Shakespeare Festival in Center Valley, Pennsylvania; Jerry Vogel at the Shakespeare Festival of St. Louis in St. Louis, Missouri, in 2007; Mike Ryan in 2007 at Shakespeare Santa Cruz in Santa Cruz, California; Stephen Lydic at Shakespeare by the Sea in Los Angeles, California in 2011; and John Hickok at the Shakespeare Theatre of New Jersey in Madison, New Jersey in 2014.

=== Film ===
Don Pedro was first performed on film in the 1964 German language adaptation of Much Ado About Nothing, Viel Lärm um nichts by German actor Wilfried Ortmann.

In English, Don Pedro has been portrayed by Denzel Washington, in Kenneth Brannagh’s 1993 adaptation, and Reed Diamond, in Joss Whedon’s 2012 adaptation.

=== Television ===
There have been several televised recordings of Much Ado About Nothing. A recording of the 1967 National Theatre production was directed for television by Alan Cooke and featured Derek Jacobi as Don Pedro. 1973's televised recording of the New York Shakespeare Festival's production of Much Ado featured Douglass Watson as Don Pedro.

Nigel Davenport played Don Pedro in 1978 as part of the BBC's "Shakespeare Plays" series directed by Donald McWhinnie. In 1984, this production was replaced as part of the "Shakespeare Plays" series by a production featuring Jon Finch as Don Pedro and directed by Stuart Burge.

In 2005, as part of the ShakespeaRe-Told series, Michael Smiley portrayed a modernized version of Don Pedro called Peter. Peter is the director of the local news show, Wessex Tonight.
