= Beatrice (Much Ado About Nothing) =

- Much Ado About Nothing character
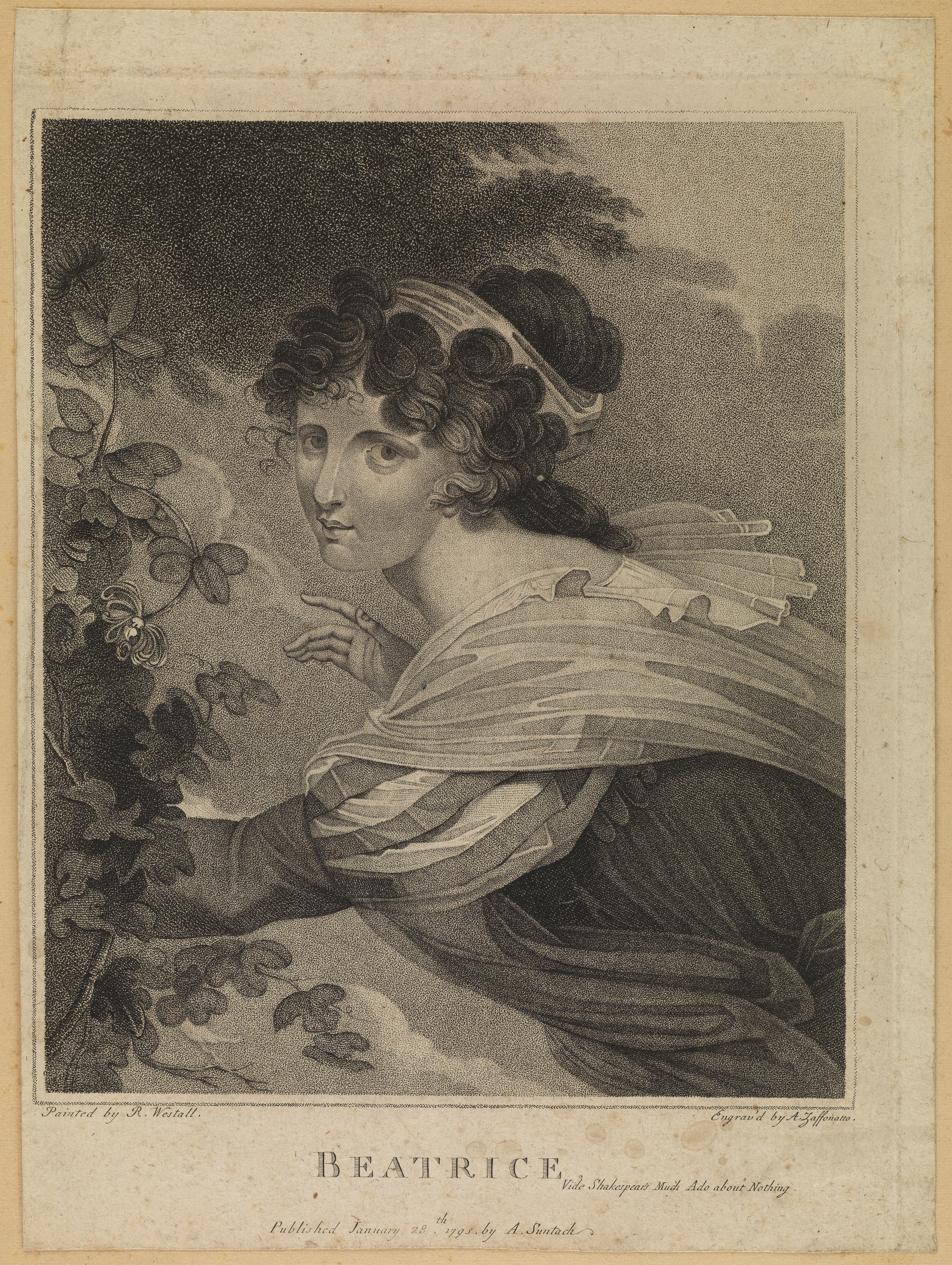
- A stipple engraving of Beatrice by Alessandro Zaffonato (1795)
- Created by: William Shakespeare
- Portrayed by: Ellen Terry; Tamsin Greig; Emma Thompson; Eve Best; Catherine Tate; Amy Acker; Danielle Brooks; Hayley Atwell

In-universe information
- Relatives: Hero (cousin); Leonato (uncle); Antonio (uncle)

Beatrice is a fictional character in William Shakespeare's play Much Ado About Nothing. In the play, she is the niece of Leonato and Antonio and the cousin of Hero. Atypically for romantic heroines of the sixteenth century (but see Rosalind in Love's Labour's Lost and Katherina in The Taming of the Shrew), she is feisty and sharp-witted; these characteristics have led some scholars to label Beatrice a protofeminist character. During the play, she is tricked into falling in love with Benedick, a soldier with whom she has a "merry war", after rumours are spread that they are in love with each other.

Beatrice has been portrayed by many actors including Frances Abington, Ellen Terry, Judi Dench, Maggie Smith, Tamsin Greig, Emma Thompson, Catherine Tate, Danielle Brooks, and Amy Acker.

== Origins ==
Shakespeare likely would have first encountered the name Beatrice in Dante's Divine Comedy in which the character of Beatrice represents divine knowledge.

Mary Augusta Scott first suggested in 1901 that Beatrice is modelled on Baldassare Castiglione's Emilia Pia from The Book of the Courtier. Walter N. King described Beatrice as representing the Petrarchan archetype of "the disdainful woman of courtly love", suggesting that she was perhaps inspired by Petrarch. Some critics suggest the Beatrice/Benedick plot has its origins in Ariosto's Orlando Furioso.

Some critics see Rosalind and Berowne (Love's Labour's Lost) and Katherina and Petruchio (The Taming of the Shrew) as Shakespeare's precursors to the witty pairing of Beatrice and Benedick.

=== Name ===
The name Beatrice is the Italian form of Beatrix which likely comes from the Latin viator meaning voyager or traveller. Beatrice also means "she who blesses" or "blesser" in Latin. This meaning is especially relevant given that the name Benedick means "blessed".

== Role in the play ==
Beatrice lives with her uncle Leonato and his daughter, Hero, who is her cousin, in Messina, Italy. At the outset of the play, Leonato welcomes a group of soldiers to his home including Benedict, with whom Beatrice has a "merry war". Beatrice used to date Benedick, so upon their reunion Beatrice and Benedick resume fighting with each other and both declare their disinterest in marriage and the opposite sex. The prince, Don Pedro, enlists everyone to trick Beatrice and Benedick into falling in love. Hero and her gentlewoman Ursula gull Beatrice by discussing Benedick's infatuation with her knowing that Beatrice will overhear. Their trickery is successful and Beatrice vows to requite Benedick's love.

Hero, who is engaged to a young soldier, Claudio, is left at the altar and accused of being unfaithful. Beatrice is unquestioning about Hero's innocence and plays along in the friar's plan to fake Hero's death to prove her innocence. After the wedding, Benedick tells Beatrice that he loves her. After some hesitation, Beatrice reveals that she feels the same way. Benedick tells Beatrice that he will do anything for her and she asks that he "Kill Claudio". Benedick denies her request and she rages at him about the injustices perpetrated against her cousin. Benedick eventually agrees, albeit reluctantly, to kill Claudio.

Later, Benedick tells Beatrice he has challenged Claudio to a duel, though she finds this insufficient. Hero is proven innocent and ends up marrying Claudio before Benedick needs to act on his promise. After some pretending, Beatrice and Benedick are compelled to admit to their true feelings when love letters they have written are revealed by Hero and Claudio. With their love revealed, Beatrice and Benedick marry, concluding the play.

== Analysis ==
=== Feminist critiques ===
Feminist critics argue that Beatrice's wit and female power only serve to enable and maintain male power. In this interpretation, Beatrice's marriage at the end of the play represents her ultimately losing her power in order to become a wife. These critics see Beatrice and Benedick's marriage at the play's conclusion as representing a curing of social abnormality. On the other-hand, critics such as Barbara Everett and John Crick have described Beatrice as a protofeminist. Cedric Watts noted that during the twentieth century, more and more performances favoured a feminist Beatrice with an increased combativeness.

Regardless of whether Beatrice can be considered a contemporary feminist, she certainly disrupted conventional sixteenth-century gender norms. Some argue that Beatrice appropriates phallic language and thereby places herself among male society. Her speech is more typical of male characters of the period.

=== "Kill Claudio" ===
In act 4, scene 1, Beatrice famously asks Benedick to "Kill Claudio". The last portion of act 4, scene 1 is often referred to as the "Kill Claudio" sequence and has been the subject of much discussion among both actors and scholars.

Some critics have argued that Beatrice's "Kill Claudio" line exposes the violence that underpins chivalric ideals. William Babula argues that by demanding that Benedick kill Claudio, Beatrice refuses to be categorized and avoids the simplicity of a label such as "shrew". Some scholars condemn "Kill Claudio" as being overly harsh in light of the fact that Claudio was tricked into defaming Hero.

Later in the scene, Beatrice repeats the phrase "that I were a man!" Phillip Collington claims that "Beatrice wishes she were a man because she wants Benedick to punish those who merely pretend to be men".

=== Love and deception ===
One of the reoccurring questions asked by generations of performers and directors is whether Beatrice and Benedick actually have feelings for each other or are merely tricked into an illusion of love. Scholars such as Richard Henze see the deception of Beatrice and Benedick, that by which they are led to believe the other is in love with them, serves as an end to their individual self-deceptions that they are not in love with each other.

Scholars following in Scott's footsteps believing Beatrice to be inspired by Emilia Pia, have interpreted Beatrice's concealment of her love for Benedict as a form of sprezzatura. C. T. Prouty argues that Beatrice and Benedick are a pair of true lovers and are thereby the antithesis of Claudio and Hero's "mariage de convenance".

=== Comparison to other Shakespeare heroines ===
G. Wilson Knight claims that Beatrice is unlike Rosaline (Love's Labour's Lost) and Rosalind (As You Like It) because she does not take a disguise but instead shows her intellect and claims space in male-dominated society. Beatrice has also been compared to Katherina from The Taming of the Shrew due to their shared shrewishness. Katherina and Petruchio as well as Rosaline and Berowne are seen by some to be Shakespeare's precursors to Beatrice and Benedick.

== Performance history ==
=== Theatre ===
==== Asia ====
In 1961, Zhu Xijuan played Beatrice with Shanghai xiju (Shanghai drama) at the Shanghai Theatre Academy. Zhu's performance was heavily influenced by the Stanislavski system of acting.

In Terrence Knapp's 1979 production of Karasawagi, the Japanese title of Much Ado About Nothing, the characters were all given Japanese names. Beatrice was called Tori. Because of the change of setting from Messina under Spanish rule to Meji-era Japan, Beatrice's line "Kill Claudio" made contextual sense due to the Japanese kinship system and principle of bushido (honour).

In 1986, Much Ado About Nothing was adapted into Huangmei opera. The role of Beatrice was played by Ma Lan. There were some difficulties in adapting the character of Beatrice to the Huangmei opera format because Beatrice's audacity in deciding to remain single is incompatible with the traditional Huangmei setting of feudal China. To account for Beatrice's behaviour, Much Ado About Nothing was set in China without specifying the time period.

==== Europe ====
In 1983, the Belgian Veel Leven om Niets starred Magda Cnudde as Beatrice. According to one review, the bustle of the farcical tone of the majority of the play drowned out the tension and emotion of the church scene featuring Beatrice's line "Kill Claudio".

Christiane von Poelnitz played Beatrice in Viel Lärm um Nichts (German for Much Ado About Nothing) at the Burgtheater in Vienna in 2006. Von Poelnitz's Beatrice was criticized for being unable to keep up with the men in the production. A critic described the show as a "männerverliebtes Männerspiel" (a men's game of men in love). In 2013, Eva Meckbach played Beatrice in the Schaubühne production of Viel Lärm um Nichts. In this production, directed by Marius von Mayenburg, both Beatrice and Benedick sang a lot.

===== UK =====
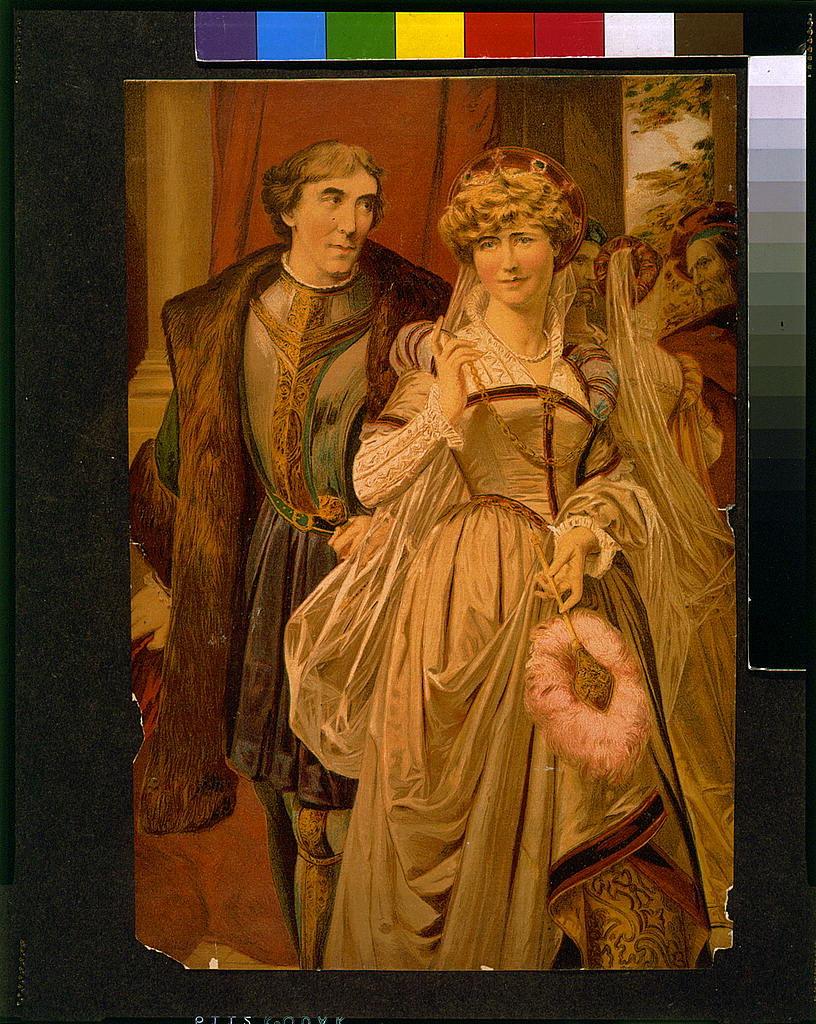
Ellen Terry (right) as Beatrice c. 1870

In the 1700s, a woman known as Frances Abington played Beatrice opposite David Garrick's Benedick. Engravings from the nineteenth century of Anna Cora Ritchie in the role of Beatrice survive, but there is no additional information about Ritchie's performance. In the late nineteenth century, Ellen Terry performed the role of Beatrice opposite Henry Irving's Benedick at the Lyceum. In 1903, Olive Kennett portrayed Beatrice. Two years later, Beatrice was played by H. B. Tree.

Maggie Smith played Beatrice at the Old Vic in 1965. This production was broadcast for television in 1967. Felicity Kendal was awarded the Evening Standard Award for "Best Actress" in 1987 for her performance as Beatrice in Elijah Moshinsky's production at the Strand Theatre.

At the Royal Shakespeare Company, Beatrice has been played by Googie Withers (1958), Judi Dench (1976), Maggie Steed (1988), Harriet Walter (2002), and Tamsin Greig (2006). Greig was awarded the Laurence Olivier Award for "Best Actress" and was the first woman to win the Critic's Circle Theatre Award for 'Best Shakespearean Performance'.

In 2007, Zoë Wanamaker played Beatrice in a production at the National Theatre directed by Nicholas Hytner. In 2011, Eve Best played Beatrice at Shakespeare's Globe in a production directed by Jeremy Herrin. The same year, Beatrice was played by Catherine Tate opposite David Tennant's Benedick as directed by Josie Rourke.

As part of the Royal Shakespeare Company's World Shakespeare Festival in 2012, Meera Syal played Beatrice in a production directed by Iqbal Khan and set in India.

In 2013, Vanessa Redgrave played Beatrice at the Old Vic under the direction of Mark Rylance. In 2017, Beatriz Romilly played Beatrice at Shakespeare's Globe. This production was set in Mexico. Mel Giedroyc played Beatrice in 2018 at the Rose Theatre, Kingston.

==== North America ====
===== Canada =====
At the Stratford Festival in Stratford, Ontario, Beatrice has been played by Jane Casson (1971), Martha Henry (1977), Maggie Smith (1980), Tana Hicken (1983), Tandy Cronyn (1987), Goldie Semple (1991), Martha Henry (1998), Deborah Hay (2012), and Maev Beaty (2023).

Camilla Scott played Beatrice at the York Shakespeare Festival in 2004 in Ontario. The production was set during the Spanish Civil War. Kate Eastwood Norris played Beatrice in a 2005 production of Much Ado About Nothing set immediately after World War II. Norris's Beatrice was described as performing "verbal jujitsu".

In 2019, Rose Napoli played Beatrice in Liza Balkan's production with Shakespeare in High Park in Toronto. This production was set in the late 1990s and transformed Beatrice into an up-and-coming stand-up comic. The show began with a ten-minute set of Beatrice's comedy co-written by Balkan and Napoli.

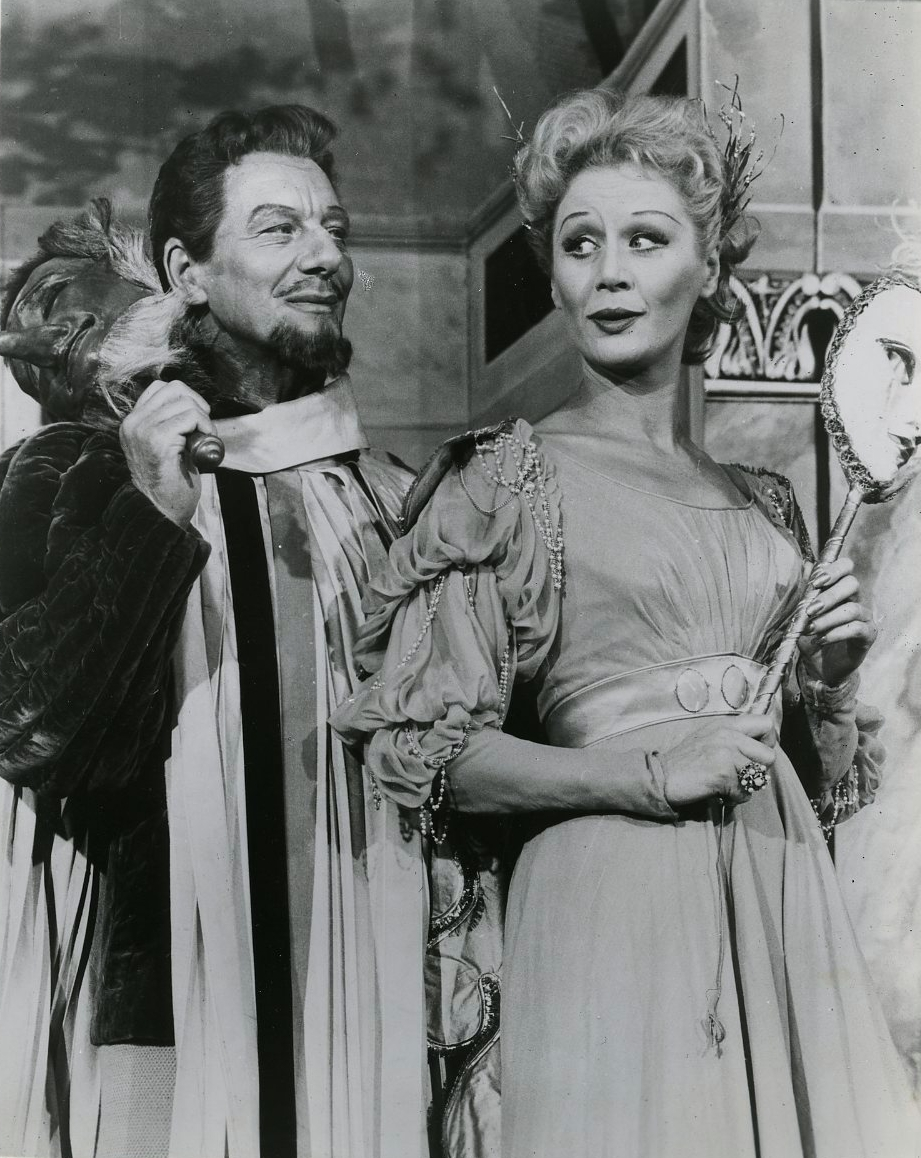
Margaret Leighton (right) as Beatrice on Broadway in 1959

===== United States =====
Margaret Leighton played Beatrice on Broadway in 1959. In 1960, Leighton was nominated for a Tony for "Best Performance by a Leading Actress in a Play" for her performance.

In 1973, Kathleen Widdoes was nominated for a "Best Performance by a Leading Actress in a Play" Tony for her portrayal of Beatrice. In 1985, Sinéad Cusack was nominated for the same award for her Beatrice.

In 1980, Barbara Dirickson played Beatrice with the American Conservatory Theater. In 1988, Blythe Danner played Beatrice at the Delacorte Theatre as part of the New York Shakespeare Festival. While eavesdropping and being tricked into thinking that Benedick is in love with her, Beatrice hides behind a bush which is subsequently watered by Hero.

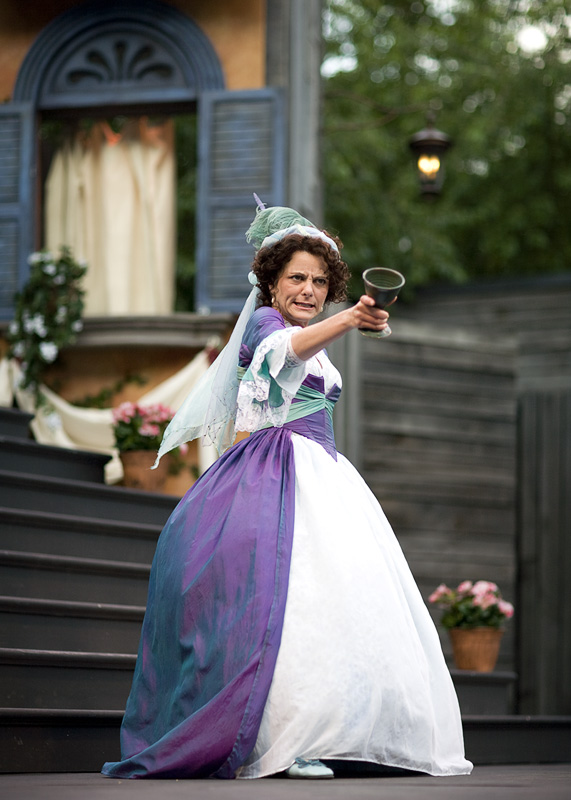
Tracy Michelle Arnold as Beatrice in 2007 at the American Players Theater

In 2007, Tracy Michelle Arnold played Beatrice at the American Players Theater in Wisconsin. Lily Rabe played Beatrice in 2014 at Shakespeare in the Park under the direction of Jack O'Brien.

In 2019, Danielle Brooks played Beatrice in a production of Much Ado About Nothing featuring an all-black cast at Shakespeare in the Park in New York City. The production, directed by Kenny Leon, was later broadcast on television as part of PBS's “Great Performances” series.

==== Russia ====
In 1936, Tsetsiliya Mansurova played Beatrice at the Vakhtangov Theatre. This production continued, with Mansurova playing Beatrice, for at least five years.

=== Film ===
In the 1964 German language adaptation, Viel Lärm um nichts, Beatrice was played by Christel Bodenstein.

Emma Thompson played Beatrice in Kenneth Branagh's 1993 adaptation of the play. Alison Findley referred to Beatrice as "a conduit for the film's emotional energy".

In Joss Whedon's 2012 film adaptation of Much Ado About Nothing, Beatrice was played by American actress Amy Acker.

Sydney Sweeney played Bea—a character based on Beatrice— in Will Gluck's 2023 romantic comedy film Anyone But You, whose plot progression was largely derivative of Much Ado About Nothing.

=== Television and Web Series ===
The earliest known UK broadcast television performance of Much Ado About Nothing featured Maggie Smith as Beatrice. The production was adapted from the performance at the Old Vic and was directed for television by Franco Zeffirelli.

In 2005, Sarah Parish played a modernized Beatrice as part of the ShakespeaRe-Told series of televised Shakespeare adaptations. In ShakespeaRe-Told, Beatrice is a news anchor at the fictitious local news show Wessex Tonight.

Harriett Maire played Beatrice in the web series "Nothing Much To Do". "Nothing Much To Do" is a modern adaptation of Much Ado About Nothing told through vlogs.
