= Much Ado About Nothing (1993 film) =

1993 period film directed by Kenneth Branagh

- Theatrical release poster
- Directed by: Kenneth Branagh
- Screenplay by: Kenneth Branagh
- Based on: Much Ado About Nothing; 1600 play by William Shakespeare
- Produced by: Kenneth Branagh; Stephen Evans; David Parfitt
- Starring: Kenneth Branagh; Michael Keaton; Robert Sean Leonard; Keanu Reeves; Emma Thompson; Denzel Washington; Kate Beckinsale
- Cinematography: Roger Lanser
- Edited by: Andrew Marcus
- Music by: Patrick Doyle
- Production companies: BBC Films; American Playhouse Theatrical Films; Renaissance Films
- Distributed by: The Samuel Goldwyn Company (United States); Entertainment Film Distributors (United Kingdom)
- Release dates: 7 May 1993 (United States); 27 August 1993 (United Kingdom)
- Running time: 110 minutes
- Countries: United Kingdom; United States
- Language: English
- Budget: £5.8 million
- Box office: $43 million

Much Ado About Nothing is a 1993 romantic comedy film based on William Shakespeare's play of the same name. It is written, co-produced and directed by Kenneth Branagh, who also stars in the film alongside Emma Thompson, Robert Sean Leonard, Denzel Washington, Michael Keaton, Keanu Reeves and Kate Beckinsale in her film debut.

The film was released on 7 May 1993, reaching 200 US screens at its widest release. It grossed $43 million worldwide, which, despite failing to reach the mark set by Franco Zeffirelli's Romeo and Juliet, made it one of the most financially successful Shakespeare films. It was also entered into the 1993 Cannes Film Festival.

== Plot ==
Having just crushed an uprising by his half-brother Don John, Don Pedro of Aragon and his noblemen visit their friend Leonato in Messina. Accompanying Don Pedro is the witty Benedick, former acquaintance of Leonato's equally sharp-tongued niece Beatrice. Also present are Benedick's friend Claudio, a young count; and Don John who, despite his rebellion, has apparently reconciled with Don Pedro.

Claudio has been attracted to Leonato's beautiful daughter Hero since before going to war and returns to find her as beautiful as ever. Don Pedro, learning of his friend's feelings, decides to act on his behalf and arranges the match at a party. An unrepentant Don John attempts unsuccessfully to foil it. Don Pedro decides to attempt a similar fate for Beatrice and Benedick, who seemingly despise each other.

Don Pedro, Leonato and Claudio stage a conversation containing a false account of how much Beatrice loves Benedick, all the while knowing he is hiding within earshot. Hero and her gentlewomen Ursula and Margaret play the same trick upon Beatrice. Each of them believes the story they hear about the other.

Amidst all the good-natured scheming, Don John has been searching for ways to stop the marriage between Claudio and Hero. The night before the wedding, Don John's servant Borachio arranges a steamy liaison with Hero's gentlewoman Margaret at Hero's chamber window. Don John shows Don Pedro and Claudio this, and they believe that they are watching Hero being unfaithful.

During the evening, the upright but incompetent constable Dogberry appoints a watch to keep the peace. The three hapless watchmen overhear Borachio bragging to his colleague Conrade about how he and Don John had succeeded in stopping the wedding. The watchmen apprehend Borachio and Conrade, and, in the morning, Dogberry attempts to have Leonato interrogate the prisoners. However, a hurried Leonato is unable to understand what the bumbling Dogberry is trying to tell him.

At the wedding, Claudio publicly disgraces his would-be bride and storms away, along with most of the guests, except for Ursula, the Friar, Leonato, Beatrice, Antonio and Benedick. They all agree to the Friar's plan to publish the tale that Hero, upon the grief of Claudio's accusations, suddenly died. Beatrice and Benedick linger a moment and eventually confess their love for one another.

In the wake of this declaration, Beatrice asks Benedick to do the one thing that will satisfy her outrage with what has just happened – kill Claudio. With a heavy heart, he agrees to challenge his friend. Meanwhile, Borachio and Conrade are interrogated by Dogberry and his men. Amidst the confusion, Don John quietly flees. Despite Dogberry's incompetence, the truth of Don John's sinister machinations is revealed.

Moments after Benedick's challenge to Claudio, Leonato is made aware of what really happened. Leonato continues to pretend to Claudio that Hero is dead. Claudio entreats him to impose whatever vengeance he sees fit for Claudio's part in Hero's disgrace and death. Leonato forgives Claudio on the condition that he publicly declare his wrongdoing and then marry Hero's cousin - his brother Antonio's daughter - the next morning. He agrees, and carries out the former by reciting an epitaph at Hero's tomb that night.

When the bride appears the next day, she is revealed to be Hero. She and Claudio profess their love for each other, as do Beatrice and Benedick, who agree to marry. Benedick renounces his challenge against Claudio

Moments later, Don John is marched in, having been captured. Benedick advises Don Pedro to forget about him until the day after the weddings. The guests begin to dance, around the two couples. Don Pedro remains behind, still single, but happy for his friends.

== Cast ==
- Kenneth Branagh as Benedick, a nobleman in the court of Don Pedro. He is fairly arrogant but shows himself to have a good heart during the "wedding" scene, as he is the only man from Don Pedro's entourage who implicitly believes Hero. His vanity and brash persona make his interactions with Beatrice argumentative, but at the end of the film, Beatrice and Benedick agree to marry.
- Emma Thompson as Beatrice, Leonato's niece, and Hero's cousin and chamber-mate. She is a strong-willed woman who charms and impresses all who know her with her wit and intelligence. She confesses her love for Benedick and agrees to marry him.
- Robert Sean Leonard as Count Claudio, the best friend of Don Pedro and Benedick, and fiancé to Hero, with whom he has been in love since before the men went to war. He does not believe Hero when she protests her innocence, and humiliates her by publicly casting her off during their wedding ceremony. When Borachio finally confesses and Hero's innocence becomes clear, Claudio is devastated over his part in her "death" (which he is led to believe). He agrees to marry Hero's cousin at Leonato's request, and is reunited with his love when it is revealed that "sweet Hero" is still alive and now his bride in truth.
- Kate Beckinsale as Hero, the naïve, kind-hearted only child of Governor Leonato, who is in love with Claudio. She is falsely accused of being unfaithful to Claudio on the night before her wedding. At the end of the film, Don John's plot against her and Claudio is revealed and they are happily married as was planned in the beginning.
- Denzel Washington as Don Pedro, Prince of Aragon; remarkable for being one of the few "marriageable" men in the piece who does not get married by the end of the play, though he does play matchmaker for others. In the second act, when he and Beatrice are alone, he quietly asks her, "will you have me, lady?", revealing his true feelings for her. Beatrice gently rebuffs his proposal, and the two remain friends. He believes, with Claudio, in Hero's alleged infidelity, but is likewise earnestly sorry when he learns the truth.
- Keanu Reeves as Don John, Don Pedro's evil half-brother. After leading a failed rebellion against Don Pedro, he conspires with his men Borachio and Conrade to stop Hero and Claudio's wedding by ruining Hero's honour. When his plot is uncovered, he attempts to escape but is captured and imprisoned.
- Richard Briers as Leonato, Governor of Messina and the father of Hero. He loves his daughter immensely, but upon hearing the false news of her infidelity, he wishes she had never been born. He eventually accepts the Friar's counsel and becomes party to the pretence that Hero has died, testing Claudio's remorse over disgracing Hero, before finally reuniting the two young lovers.
- Michael Keaton as Dogberry, the local constable. He is not as clever as he thinks, and is given to malapropisms. He and his men accidentally catch Borachio boasting about his involvement with separating Claudio and Hero. His men arrest Borachio and his conspiring friends. He ultimately saves the day by forcing Borachio to confess his part in Don John's plot.
- Gerard Horan as Borachio, Don John's drunken henchman. He assists Don John in sabotaging Claudio's and Hero's wedding by making Hero appear unfaithful and initially succeeds, but is caught boasting about his crime by Dogberry's men and forced to confess.
- Imelda Staunton as Margaret, Hero's waiting gentlewoman who is tricked by Borachio, and mistaken for Hero by Don Pedro and Claudio.
- Brian Blessed as Antonio, the brother of Leonato. He is very friendly, but is incensed by the accusations leveled against Hero.
- Ben Elton as Verges, the local headborough and Dogberry's partner.
- Jimmy Yuill as Friar Francis, the priest at Claudio and Hero's wedding who fervently defends Hero from the accusations made against her.
- Richard Clifford as Conrade, a henchman of Don John.
- Phyllida Law as Ursula, Hero's other waiting gentlewoman.
- Patrick Doyle as Balthazar, Don Pedro's musician.

== Production ==
In 1990, Kenneth Branagh initiated efforts to adapt William Shakespeare's Much Ado About Nothing for the screen, marking his second Shakespearean project following 1989's Henry V. He opted for Much Ado About Nothing due to its accessibility, noting that the majority of the play is in prose, making it "very easy on the ear". However, upon circulation, the screenplay faced criticism from certain financiers for its heavy reliance on dialogue. Despite rejections from Walt Disney Pictures and Paramount Pictures, the Samuel Goldwyn Company stepped in to finance and distribute the film. This agreement was part of a larger two-picture deal that included Branagh's forthcoming release, Peter's Friends (1992).

The production budget ranged between $10 million and $15 million, with Goldwyn holding global distribution rights except for the U.K., which were retained by Branagh's Renaissance Films. Although Goldwyn initially greenlit the project independently, additional funding came from American Playhouse Theatrical Films and Columbia TriStar Home Video. American Playhouse secured television broadcast rights for $550,000, while Columbia acquired home video rights for approximately $1.65 million, collectively covering around twenty percent of the production budget. Initial expenditures for prints and advertising totaled $2 million.

The ensemble cast was compensated on a "most-favored nations" basis, receiving equal salaries along with a share of potential backend profits. Principal photography commenced on August 3, 1992, spanning eight weeks at the Villa Vignamaggio in Greve in Chianti, Italy. Filming conditions proved challenging, with temperatures often reaching 100 °F (38 °C) during the final month. Various sets, including a small chapel, an Etruscan-style open-air bathhouse, a fountain, and formal gardens, were constructed at the villa. Additionally, scenes set in a prison were shot in a converted wine cellar. Notably, the Villa Vignamaggio is where the Mona Lisa was believed to have been painted by Leonardo da Vinci and Branagh lodged in the same room where Lisa del Giocondo, the portrait's subject, purportedly stayed. Filming wrapped the week of September 21, 1992.

== Release ==
In early 1993, Warner Bros. Pictures executives viewed the film with interest in distributing it, but subsequent negotiations led Goldwyn to opt for self-distribution. The film competed at the 1993 Cannes Film Festival and was showcased at the annual Shakespeare Society of America convention in Atlanta, Georgia. Its Los Angeles premiere, held on May 10, 1993, at the Mann National Theater, raised $40,000–$50,000 for the Los Angeles County Museum of Art film department. Following this, it served as the closing night feature at the San Francisco International Film Festival on May 13, 1993, and was subsequently screened at the Seattle International Film Festival the following night. A platform theatrical release commenced on May 7, 1993, in New York City, expanding to Los Angeles on May 14, 1993, across eleven screens. The release broadened to over twenty screens in various other major cities over Memorial Day weekend, reaching 200 screens by the Fourth of July weekend and finally 400 screens by September 24, 1993.

Internationally, the film had a rare four-week run at the American Trade Center in Moscow, Russia, where ticket sales were conducted in U.S. dollars. On September 29, 1993, Goldwyn launched a special educational promotion targeting high school and college students, offering discounted admissions and free study guides. Despite a $200,000 investment in an Academy Awards "for your consideration" campaign, the film did not receive any nominations. Nonetheless, commercially, it performed remarkably well for a Shakespeare adaptation.

== Reception ==
=== Critical response ===
On Rotten Tomatoes the film holds a 90% rating based on 49 reviews, with an average rating of 7.1/10. The site's consensus reads, "Kenneth Branagh's love for the material is contagious in this exuberant adaptation." On Metacritic, it has an average score of 80 out of 100, based on reviews from 25 critics.

Roger Ebert of the Chicago Sun-Times gave it three out of four, calling it "cheerful from beginning to end". Vincent Canby of The New York Times also wrote the film a positive review, praising Branagh's direction and calling it "ravishing entertainment". Desson Thomson of The Washington Post praised Branagh's cuts to the text as giving "wonderful import to this silliness from long ago" and stated that "Kenneth Branagh has, once again, blown away the forbidding academic dust and found a funny retro-essence for the '90s." Online critic James Berardinelli gave the film a glowing four-star review, calling it a "gem of a movie", especially praising the accessibility of the humor, the performances, and Branagh's lively direction, of which he wrote, "This film cements Branagh's status as a great director of Shakespeare, and perhaps of film in general, as well."

Peter Travers of Rolling Stone gave the film a negative review, praising some moments as "invigorating fun", but ultimately calling it "overripe". Most of the negative criticisms focused on particular casting choices, notably Keanu Reeves as Don John, and Michael Keaton as Dogberry. For his performance in the film, Reeves received a Golden Raspberry nomination for Worst Supporting Actor.

Much Ado About Nothing was ranked #11 on Rotten Tomatoes list of Greatest Shakespeare Movies.

=== Box office ===
The film opened on 3 screens on 7 May 1993 in the United States and grossed $108,617 for the weekend and went on to gross $22.5 million at the US and Canadian box office. In the United Kingdom, it opened on 27 August 1993 on 106 screens and grossed £450,520 for the weekend, placing fifth at the UK box office. It went on to gross £5.19 million in the UK. After 12 weeks in France, it had more than 70,000 admissions and 50,000 in Switzerland over the same period. From four screens in Israel, it had 94,000 admissions in seven weeks. It went on to gross $43 million worldwide.

=== Accolades ===
| Award | Category | Recipients | Result |
|---|---|---|---|
| British Academy Film Awards | Best Costume Design | Phyllis Dalton | Nominated |
| Cannes Film Festival | Palme d'Or | Kenneth Branagh | Nominated |
| Evening Standard British Film Awards | Best Actress | Emma Thompson | Won |
| Golden Globe Awards | Best Motion Picture – Musical or Comedy | Kenneth Branagh, Stephen Evans, David Parfitt | Nominated |
| Independent Spirit Awards | Best Film | Kenneth Branagh, Stephen Evans, David Parfitt | Nominated |
| Independent Spirit Awards | Best Female Lead | Emma Thompson | Nominated |
| London Film Critics' Circle | British Producer of the Year | Kenneth Branagh | Won |
| Golden Raspberry Award | Worst Supporting Actor | Keanu Reeves | Nominated |

The film is recognized by American Film Institute in these lists:

- 2005: AFI's 100 Years of Film Scores – Nominated

=== Soundtrack ===
Much Ado About Nothing

Film score by Patrick Doyle
- Released: 4 May 1993
- Recorded: 1993
- Genre: Soundtrack
- Length: 59:02
- Label: Epic Soundtrax

Professional ratings
Review scores
| Source | Rating |
|---|---|
| Filmtracks | link |

The film's score was composed by Patrick Doyle, a frequent Branagh collaborator. Doyle makes a brief cameo as Balthazar, singing "Sigh No More Ladies" and "Pardon, Goddess of the Night". The music soundtrack, released 4 May 1993 by Epic Soundtrax, features twenty-four compositions, running just under an hour.

1. "The Picnic" (2:28)
2. "Overture" (4:20)
3. "The Sweetest Lady" (2:05)
4. "The Conspirators" (2:39)
5. "The Masked Ball" (1:55)
6. "The Prince Woos Hero" (1:18)
7. "A Star Danced" (2:43)
8. "Rich She Shall Be" (1:42)
9. "Sigh No More Ladies" (1:58)
10. "The Gulling of Benedick" (3:12)
11. "It Must Be Requited" (1:58)
12. "The Gulling of Beatrice" (1:41)
13. "Contempt Farewell" (1:32)
14. "The Lady is Disloyal" (2:14)
15. "Hero's Wedding" (0:47)
16. "Take Her Back Again" (3:10)
17. "Die to Live" (4:43)
18. "You Have Killed a Sweet Lady" (3:03)
19. "Choose Your Revenge" (1:48)
20. "Pardon, Goddess of the Night" (4:32)
21. "Did I Not Tell You" (1:40)
22. "Hero Revealed" (1:26)
23. "Benedick the Married Man" (2:06)
24. "Strike Up Pipers" (2:41)

== See also ==
- Color-blind casting
