= In Your Eyes (2014 film) =

- Film poster
- Directed by: Brin Hill
- Written by: Joss Whedon
- Produced by: Kai Cole; Michael Roiff
- Starring: Zoe Kazan; Michael Stahl-David; Nikki Reed; Steve Harris; Mark Feuerstein
- Cinematography: Elisha Christian
- Edited by: Steven Pilgrim
- Music by: Tony Morales
- Production companies: Bellwether Pictures; Night & Day Pictures
- Release date: April 20, 2014
- Running time: 108 minutes
- Country: United States
- Language: English

In Your Eyes is a 2014 American independent paranormal romance film directed by Brin Hill and written by Joss Whedon, starring Zoe Kazan, Michael Stahl-David, Nikki Reed, Steve Harris and Mark Feuerstein. It is the second feature by Bellwether Pictures. In Your Eyes, set in New Mexico and New Hampshire, follows Dylan and Rebecca. They live on opposite sides of the country but are able to sense what the other is feeling – despite being strangers.

The film had its world premiere at the 2014 Tribeca Film Festival on April 20. Immediately afterward, it was self-distributed online instead of taking on theatrical distribution.

== Plot ==
A young Rebecca is about to go sledding in New Hampshire, while across the country in New Mexico, a young Dylan is at school with a group of his friends. Suddenly, without even knowing what is happening or why, Dylan is able to experience everything that Rebecca experiences, and at the exact moment that Rebecca crashes her sled, rendering her unconscious, Dylan is thrown from his desk and knocked out.

Twenty years later, Rebecca is married to a successful doctor, Phillip, while Dylan has just recently gotten out of prison. One night, Rebecca attends a dinner party with her husband, and Dylan is at a local bar trying to stay out of trouble. However, a man whom he had been playing pool with earlier hits him on the back with a pool stick. The impact flings Rebecca to the floor, which she cannot explain to the host of the dinner party and her husband chastises her for her behaviour afterwards.

The next day, Dylan and Becky connect once more and they learn that if they speak aloud they can hear one another, they can see what the other is looking at, and feel what the other is feeling. They establish that they are not just figments of their respective imaginations and that the presence at the other end is a real person. They talk later that night and they begin to get to know each other while they talk, show each other their surroundings, share their dreams and shared experiences, and finally step in front of mirrors for a visual introduction.

Throughout their respective experiences of Rebecca at Philip's fundraiser and Dylan dating a woman, they grow closer. Becky realizes that Dylan is in love with her and she herself is also falling in love with him, so she tries to break off their communication. Becky's husband notices she has grown distant from him and he is puzzled and disturbed by the odd behavior he has seen when while she has been in mental contact with Dylan. One of her friends, thinking that Becky is either having an affair or is cracking up, brings her suspicions to him, and he and a medical colleague have her forcibly institutionalized. Dylan, on the other hand, loses his post-prison job at a car wash when customers are concerned with his mental state observing him seemingly talking to himself while he is in contact with Becky. While he is trying to make a clean break from his criminal past, he is menaced by two long-time criminal acquaintances trying to pressure him into using his skills as a burglar to help them do a heist.

Later, Dylan feels that Becky is in trouble so he violates his parole by stealing a truck to get to the airport and subsequently leaves the state without permission by taking a plane to New Hampshire to rescue Becky from the mental institution. Unable to rent a car at the airport, Dylan steals one. While she telepathically guides him on the roads between the airport and the institution, he uses his criminal smarts to guide Becky through her escape from the facility, including picking a lock on a door. Becky avoids detection until reaching the front door, where she runs into her husband and subsequently punches him in the face before fleeing the facility, while Dylan is being chased by several police cars. They both manage to elude their respective pursuers and end up on foot running through the woods towards a train. They manage to climb into an empty box car, where they finally unite in person and share a kiss.

== Cast ==
- Zoe Kazan as Rebecca Porter
- Michael Stahl-David as Dylan Kershaw
- Nikki Reed as Donna
- Steve Harris as Giddons
- Mark Feuerstein as Phillip Porter
- Steve Howey as Bo Soames
- David Gallagher as Lyle Soames
- Michael Yebba as Chief Booth
- Reed Birney as Dr. Maynard
- Joe Unger as Wayne
- Tamara Hickey as Dorothy
- Jennifer Grey as Diane

Abigail Spencer was originally set to play the lead in the film, but the role was later given to Kazan.

== Production ==
Principal photography began late February 2012, in New Hampshire. Producer and co-founder of Bellwether Pictures Kai Cole elaborated on the choice, saying, “Location is very important to me. I think people can tell when you're tricking them with movie magic. We wanted everything to be authentic, from the architecture to the landscape and New Hampshire is perfect for us". Director Brin Hill added that resulting from the importance of it in the script, "we were chasing snow. We started out in Connecticut, but there was no snow, so we moved to Ohio, but there was no snow [...] and we kept moving north". The filming took place in Exeter, Manchester, Hooksett, Bedford, Windham, Claremont and Amherst.

The opening sequence at the sledding hill was filmed at McIntyre Ski Area, and some footage was also shot in the New Mexico desert. They wrapped their last day of filming on the East Coast in early March 2012, moving next to Los Angeles to shoot the other half. Hill shot the film digitally with an Arri Alexa, and said that he enjoyed the "versatility" of it, citing its proximity in look to film as a satisfying trait for both him and his DP, Elisha Christian. The screenplay was written by Joss Whedon in the early 90s, and went through multiple rewrites over the course of two decades. To Hill, "the most interesting aspect of the script was its theme of connection–and what it means to connect in today’s society".

== Music ==
Tony Morales composed the score for In Your Eyes. It was recorded at Emoto Studios in 2013. On collaborating with Brin Hill and Joss Whedon, Morales said, "I primarily worked with Brin on the music for [the film]. Joss had a vision for the score that we were able to run with. As the sound of the score was coming together, Joss and the other producers were all part of the approval process". A hybrid of string instruments, piano sounds, and a variety of electronic music were used by Morales to convey a sense of "mystery" that could "weave in and out" of the "romantic energy". All music was released by Lakeshore Records. The score and soundtrack were digitally available on June 10, 2014.

In Your Eyes (Original Motion Picture Score)
| No. | Title | Length |
|---|---|---|
| 1. | "In Your Eyes" | 3:38 |
| 2. | "Connected" | 1:19 |
| 3. | "You’re Real" | 1:51 |
| 4. | "It’s Snowing" | 1:11 |
| 5. | "10pm Date" | 1:36 |
| 6. | "Did You Ever Go Sledding?" | 1:20 |
| 7. | "Mirror" | 1:42 |
| 8. | "Kinda Personal" | 1:59 |
| 9. | "Look under the Hood" | 1:08 |
| 10. | "Rebecca Visits Phil" | 0:59 |
| 11. | "Phillip and Rebecca" | 1:02 |
| 12. | "I Should Go" | 0:54 |
| 13. | "Quirks and Insecurities" | 2:30 |
| 14. | "Rebecca Is Having an Affair" | 1:59 |
| 15. | "Break Up" | 4:22 |
| 16. | "Rebecca Put In Hospital" | 1:22 |
| 17. | "Time to Go To Work" | 3:46 |
| 18. | "On His Way" | 5:33 |
| 19. | "Make a Break for It" | 2:22 |
| 20. | "Together At Last" | 2:44 |
| Total length: | | 43:17 |

In Your Eyes (Original Motion Picture Soundtrack)
| No. | Title | Writer(s) | Artist(s) | Length |
|---|---|---|---|---|
| 1. | "Go Get Another Dream" | | Andrew Johnson | 3:48 |
| 2. | "Temptation" | | Ray Beadle | 4:10 |
| 3. | "Resurrection Fern" | | Iron & Wine | 4:50 |
| 4. | "The Riot’s Gone" | | Santigold | 3:30 |
| 5. | "Crumblin’" | Joss Whedon | Noah Maffit, Jessica Freedman | 3:42 |
| 6. | "Trouble I’m In" | | Twinbed | 3:20 |
| 7. | "Glad I Found You" | | Eddie Ray | 2:41 |
| 8. | "In The Dark" | | Opus Orange | 3:21 |
| 9. | "Fired Up" | | Matt Andersen | 3:46 |
| 10. | "Stand In The Water" | | Wildlife | 4:17 |
| 11. | "The Break Up" | | Tony Morales | 4:22 |

== Release ==
In Your Eyes premiered on April 20 at the 2014 Tribeca Film Festival. In place of theatrical distribution, the film was put up for simultaneous release. The venture was announced after its debut screening in a video message from Joss Whedon, who said that the Tribeca premiere was "not just the premiere of the film. It is the worldwide release date". Brin Hill described the experimental method as "bittersweet, because it's uncharted territory. But there’s something thrilling about this. [...] There’s something exciting about just making it available everywhere to everyone at once".

In Your Eyes was released on DVD on February 10, 2015.

== Reception ==
According to Rotten Tomatoes, 61% of critics have given the film positive feedback (based on 18 reviews).

Kurt Loder of Reason.com complimented the director for making "a lustrous film out of Whedon's ingenious story", while Mark Adams of ScreenDaily lauded it by saying, "It has the perfect balance of humour and tenderness, with just a dash of danger and even melodrama on the side". John DeFore of The Hollywood Reporter praised Brin Hill's ability to depict "the couple's growing intimacy", but felt that "the forces keeping both from being fulfilled" lacked development. Eric Kohn of Indiewire wrote that In Your Eyes "successfully offers the lightweight alternative to Whedon's bigger projects: It's cheesy and slight, but persistently smart and entertaining within those narrow parameters".

The Guardian scored the film two out of five stars, calling it "a rom-com version of The Shining". Peter Debruge of Variety said that the film's "setup never really matures beyond a sentimental teenage fantasy".

== See also ==
- Your Name (2016)
