= Much Ado About Nothing (2012 film) =

2012 romantic comedy film by Joss Whedon

- Theatrical release poster
- Directed by: Joss Whedon
- Screenplay by: Joss Whedon
- Based on: Much Ado About Nothing by William Shakespeare
- Produced by: Joss Whedon; Kai Cole
- Starring: Amy Acker; Alexis Denisof; Reed Diamond; Nathan Fillion; Clark Gregg; Fran Kranz; Sean Maher; Jillian Morgese
- Cinematography: Jay Hunter
- Edited by: Daniel Kaminsky; Joss Whedon
- Music by: Joss Whedon
- Production company: Bellwether Pictures
- Distributed by: Lionsgate; Roadside Attractions
- Release dates: September 8, 2012 (TIFF); June 21, 2013 (United States)
- Running time: 108 minutes
- Country: United States
- Language: Early Modern English
- Box office: $5.3 million

Much Ado About Nothing is a 2012 American romantic comedy film written, produced, directed, edited and composed by Joss Whedon, based on William Shakespeare's play of the same name. The film stars Amy Acker, Alexis Denisof, Nathan Fillion, Clark Gregg, Reed Diamond, Fran Kranz, Sean Maher, Jillian Morgese, Spencer Treat Clark, Riki Lindhome, Ashley Johnson, Tom Lenk, and Romy Rosemont.

To create the film, director Whedon established the production studio Bellwether Pictures. The film premiered at the 2012 Toronto International Film Festival and had its North American theatrical release on June 21, 2013.

== Premise ==
The plot of the film is largely unchanged from that of Shakespeare's original play. Differences include the modern-day setting, switching Conrade's gender, eliminating several minor roles and consolidating others into Leonato's aide, and expanding Ursula's role by giving her a number of Margaret's scenes. In addition, the film adds background to the relationship between Beatrice and Benedick by showing, in an opening scene, a morning after they apparently slept together, and later, flashbacks that confirm this. Benedick is beardless in both, so this is presumably some time before the plot of the movie takes place.

== Cast ==
- Amy Acker as Beatrice, niece of Leonato.
- Alexis Denisof as Benedick, of Padua; companion of Don Pedro.
- Reed Diamond as Don Pedro, Prince of Aragon.
- Nathan Fillion as Dogberry, the constable in charge of Messina's night watch.
- Clark Gregg as Leonato, governor of Messina; Hero's father.
- Fran Kranz as Claudio, of Florence; a count, companion of Don Pedro, friend to Benedick.
- Sean Maher as Don John, "the Bastard Prince," half-brother of Don Pedro.
- Jillian Morgese as Hero, Leonato's daughter.
- Spencer Treat Clark as Borachio, follower of Don John.
- Riki Lindhome as Conrade, lover of Don John (originally, follower of Don John, a male role).
- Ashley Johnson as Margaret, waiting-gentlewoman attendant on Hero.
- Emma Bates as Ursula, waiting-gentlewoman attendant on Hero.
- Tom Lenk as Verges, the Headborough, Dogberry's partner
- Nick Kocher as first watchman
- Brian McElhaney as second watchman
- Joshua Zar as Leonato's aide
- Paul M. Meston as Friar Francis, a priest.
- Romy Rosemont as The Sexton, the district attorney at Borachio and Conrade's interrogation (originally, the judge at the trial of Borachio, a male role).

Anthony Head was originally intended for the role of Leonato, but was unavailable. Clark Gregg had worked with Whedon on The Avengers at the time, and stepped in to play the part. Most of the cast had worked with Whedon before: Acker and Denisof on Angel; Denisof, Fillion, Lenk and Lindhome on Buffy the Vampire Slayer; Fillion and Maher on Firefly; Acker, Denisof, Diamond, Kranz and Johnson on Dollhouse; Gregg, Denisof, Rosemont, Johnson and Morgese in The Avengers.

== Production ==
Principal photography started mid-October 2011, and took place at Joss Whedon's residence in Santa Monica, California. On the choice of location, he told Studio 360: "First of all, my wife built that house. And I knew from the moment I set foot in it that I would want to film something there. Because it's all in one place, that place informs the mood and the feeling and the look of the picture so much, and I was really already comfortable with that". Whedon and his wife, Kai Cole, produced the film through their studio Bellwether Pictures. It was filmed entirely in a black-and-white palette over a period of 12 days, in conjunction with cinematographer Jay Hunter. Whedon shot it while on a contractual vacation from the post-production of The Avengers. The cast and crew were informed to keep the project a secret until production was finished. They wrapped their last day of filming on October 23, 2011.

Whedon explained his initial interest in the project, saying:

I fixated on this notion that our ideas of romantic love are created for us by the society around us, and then escape from that is grown-up love, is marriage, is mature love, to escape the ideals of love that we're supposed to follow.

He elaborated on that sentiment, and said "It's a very cynically romantic text about love, and how we behave, and how we're expected to behave. It's a party, but there's something darker there as well". Inspired by the exposing nature of film, Whedon decided to infuse a recurring motif of sexuality, "...because it's a visual medium. You can say it or you can show it. ... There's an element to it, of debauchery, that was fun for a time but then it was just sort of dark". Whedon's idea to adapt the play for the screen originated from having "Shakespeare readings" at his house with several of his friends, years prior.

Whedon and his director of photography Jay Hunter took advantage of natural lighting in order to make it feel "very found", noting: "Our lighting package rose in the east and set in the west". Using mirrors, glass and windows to shoot through, he explains: "[It's] something I'd like to do all the time, but particularly in a movie that's all about lies, and manipulation and misunderstandings. The more you can warp the frame a little bit, the more it speaks towards what's going on". The film was shot hand-held, digitally with multiple cameras, often with a RED Epic, and used a Lensbaby Composer with Double Glass lens on a Canon 7D to differentiate certain scenes.

== Soundtrack ==
Whedon composed the score for the film and recruited Deborah Lurie to produce. He also arranged music to two songs, written by Shakespeare for the play, "Sigh No More" and "Heavily", and performed by Maurissa Tancharoen and Jed Whedon. The soundtrack was released digitally on June 6, 2013.

== Release ==
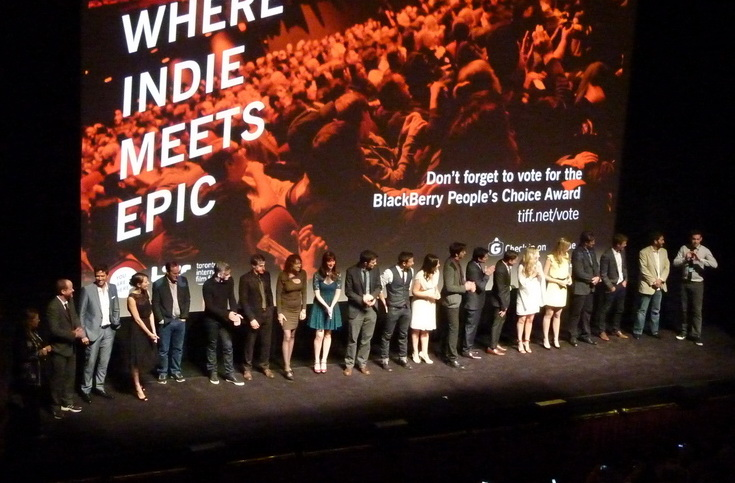
Cast and crew at the 2012 Toronto International Film Festival premiere.

Much Ado About Nothing had its world premiere at the 2012 Toronto International Film Festival. The film's North American distribution rights were acquired by Lionsgate, in association with Roadside Attractions, for a joint theatrical release. It was later reported that the film would have a limited theatrical release on June 7, 2013. Kaleidoscope Film Distribution obtained worldwide sales and UK distribution rights. European premieres have been held at the 2013 Jameson Dublin International Film Festival, the 2013 Glasgow Film Festival, the 2013 Istanbul Film Festival, the 2013 Bradford International Film Festival, the 2013 Belfast Film Festival, the 2013 Filmfest München, the 2013 Athens International Film Festival and the 2013 Helsinki Film Festival. The film premiered in the United States at the 2013 South by Southwest Film Festival, followed by the 2013 Wisconsin Film Festival, the 2013 San Francisco International Film Festival, the 2013 Independent Film Festival of Boston and the 2013 Seattle International Film Festival. The limited release in New York City, Los Angeles and San Francisco was expanded on June 14, 2013. On June 21, 2013, it released in 200-300 screens nationwide.

=== Rating ===
Much Ado About Nothing was officially given a PG-13 rating by the MPAA for American cinemas. It got a 12A certificate in the United Kingdom from the British Board of Film Classification.

=== International releases ===
Sharmill Films distributed the film to Australian theaters. It was shown at the New Zealand International Film Festival in July 2013. The film was released theatrically in the United Kingdom.

== Reception ==
=== Box office ===
==== North America ====
In limited release and playing in only five theaters in New York City, Los Angeles and San Francisco, it grossed $71,000 on its first day. At the end of its opening weekend, it had grossed $183,400. The $15,027 it made at the Lincoln Film Center Society Theater broke the venue's house record. With the expansion into 18 additional theaters in the second week of its limited release, the film garnered an amount of $162,580.

The first weekend of wide release in the U.S. grossed $762,350 from 206 theaters, which accumulated a total amount of $1,234,781 since release. It earned $590,000 after the second week. The fourth week held an overall aggregate of $263,700. Domestic total gross amounted to $4,328,850.

==== Other territories ====
The film's opening weekend in the United Kingdom grossed $101,237 from having been screened at 64 locations. The box office numbers for Australia's opening weekend amounted to $78,196. The international box office contributed $971,794 to the film's final cumulative total.

=== Critical reaction ===
On the review aggregator website Rotten Tomatoes, 87% of 176 critics' reviews are positive. The website's consensus reads: "Lighthearted to a fault, Much Ado About Nothing's giddy energy and intimate charm make for an entertaining romantic comedy—and a Shakespearean adaptation that's hard to resist" Metacritic, which uses a weighted average, assigned the film a score of 78 out of 100, based on 37 critics, indicating "generally favorable" reviews.

Within the first 10 minutes of Joss Whedon's "Much Ado About Nothing," I found myself smiling with excitement, while also holding my breath in nervous anxiety. Would the film be able to sustain its confident manic tone, maintain its humor and smarts, its depth of characterization and innovative use of text and landscape? Would the magic hold? The magic holds. It holds from beginning to end.

— Sheila O'Malley, writing for the Chicago Sun-Times.

John DeFore of The Hollywood Reporter gave a positive review of the film, remarking: "...more than most adaptations, this is a film true to Shakespeare's practice of employing all means at hand to keep the crowd entertained". Tom Clift of Moviedex complimented the director's use of subtle visual humor. The Guardian scored the film four out of five stars, calling it "...the first great contemporary Shakespeare since Baz Luhrmann's Romeo and Juliet". Christopher Schobert of IndieWire wrote: "The result is an utter joy, Whedon's most emotionally resonant and fully realized feature film to date. And I say that as one who is not a devoted member of the Whedon army". Sheila O'Malley of the Chicago Sun-Times gave the film four out of four stars, noting that "Much Ado About Nothing is one of the best films of the year".

BBC Radio 5 Live's Mark Kermode said of the film: "One of the things that it manages to do is, firstly, make all the dialogue and the language completely comprehensible". He proceeded to note that "it makes sense to its audience. I think that the comedy is funny, and I don't say that lightly. ... And finally, I think in terms of the way in which it deals with that gender politics issue is really well done. ... It's a very hard trick to pull off, and he did it in two weeks!" Helen O'Hara of Empire believed that, while keeping a sense of noir to compensate the romance, it was "in balancing these competing elements and characters that this version really shines". The Village Voice's Chris Packham said that the director "approaches the story with a tremendous amount of joy".

Associated Press reviewer Jake Coyle wrote that "moviegoers will likely have few better options this summer for a good romantic comedy". A. O. Scott of The New York Times called it "the liveliest and most purely delightful movie I have seen so far this year", concluding to laud the film for its "sly, robust eroticism". Andrew O'Hehir of Salon wrote: "[It] possesses that Whedon-esque nerdy energy, fizzing with humor, eroticism, booze and more than a hint of danger". Kenneth Turan of the Los Angeles Times thought the film was "good-humored and unpretentious in equal measure", going on to praise its visual performance. IGN gave it a 7.5 out of ten, noting that "everyone should see this movie".

Chris Davis of the Memphis Flyer wrote that modest budget Shakespeare adaptations like Whedon's and H4 can have more life than lavish productions like Kenneth Brannaugh's Hamlet, because a smaller setting resembles the simplicity of a stage while expensive productions become photographically redundant with the rich language.

Joe Morgenstern of The Wall Street Journal gave high encomium to Kranz's performance, expressing that the actor "portrays Claudio with affecting passion", and says of the film: "The joyous spirit of the play has been preserved in this modest, homegrown production". Rolling Stone journalist Peter Travers wrote that the film was "an irresistible blend of mirth and malice". Justin Chang of Variety sensed that the black-and-white evoked a "timeless romanticism", which was additionally enhanced by the "lightly applied score". Chris Nashawaty of Entertainment Weekly—despite commending it for being "both daring and delightfully daffy"—admits, "The film isn't as fast and funny as it could be".

==== Top ten lists ====
- 4th – David Edelstein, Vulture
- 4th – Stephanie Zacharek, The Village Voice
- Top 10 (listed alphabetically, not ranked) – National Board of Review

=== Accolades ===
List of awards and nominations
Year	Award	Recipient(s)	Result	Ref(s)
2013	13th Belfast Film Festival Audience Award	Joss Whedon	Won	
2013	IFF Boston Audience Award for Best Narrative Feature	Much Ado About Nothing	Won	

=== Home media ===
Much Ado About Nothing was released on Blu-ray Disc and DVD on October 8, 2013. The film's US Blu-ray Disc features 1080p video, DTS-HD Master Audio 5.1 surround, an UltraViolet digital copy, a music video for "Sigh No More" (one of the songs from the soundtrack), two audio commentaries and two featurettes. Much Ado About Nothing was awarded the Guinness World Record for having the most people record a Blu-ray or DVD commentary – 16.

== See also ==
- List of black-and-white films produced since 1970
