= Bellwether Pictures =

American film studio

- Company type: Private
- Industry: Motion picture
- Founded: 2011
- Founder: Joss Whedon; Kai Cole
- Headquarters: Los Angeles, United States

Bellwether Pictures is an American film production studio based in Los Angeles, United States. The company was founded by screenwriter, film director and producer Joss Whedon and his then-wife Kai Cole as co-founder/producer. Their purpose is to bring micro-budget films directly to an audience, bypassing "the classic studio structure".

== History ==
In 2012, Bellwether released Much Ado About Nothing, for which Lionsgate and Roadside Attractions handled US theatrical distribution. The next production was Brin Hill's In Your Eyes. Written by Whedon, it became the studio's first endeavor in using a method of distribution for simultaneous release.

== Filmography ==
Year	Title	Director	Co-production company(s)	Distributor(s)	Box office	Ref.
2012	Much Ado About Nothing	Joss Whedon	—N/a	Lionsgate / Roadside Attractions	$5,300,644	
2014	In Your Eyes	Brin Hill	Night & Day Pictures	—N/a	—N/a	—N/a
