= Jillian Morgese =

American actress

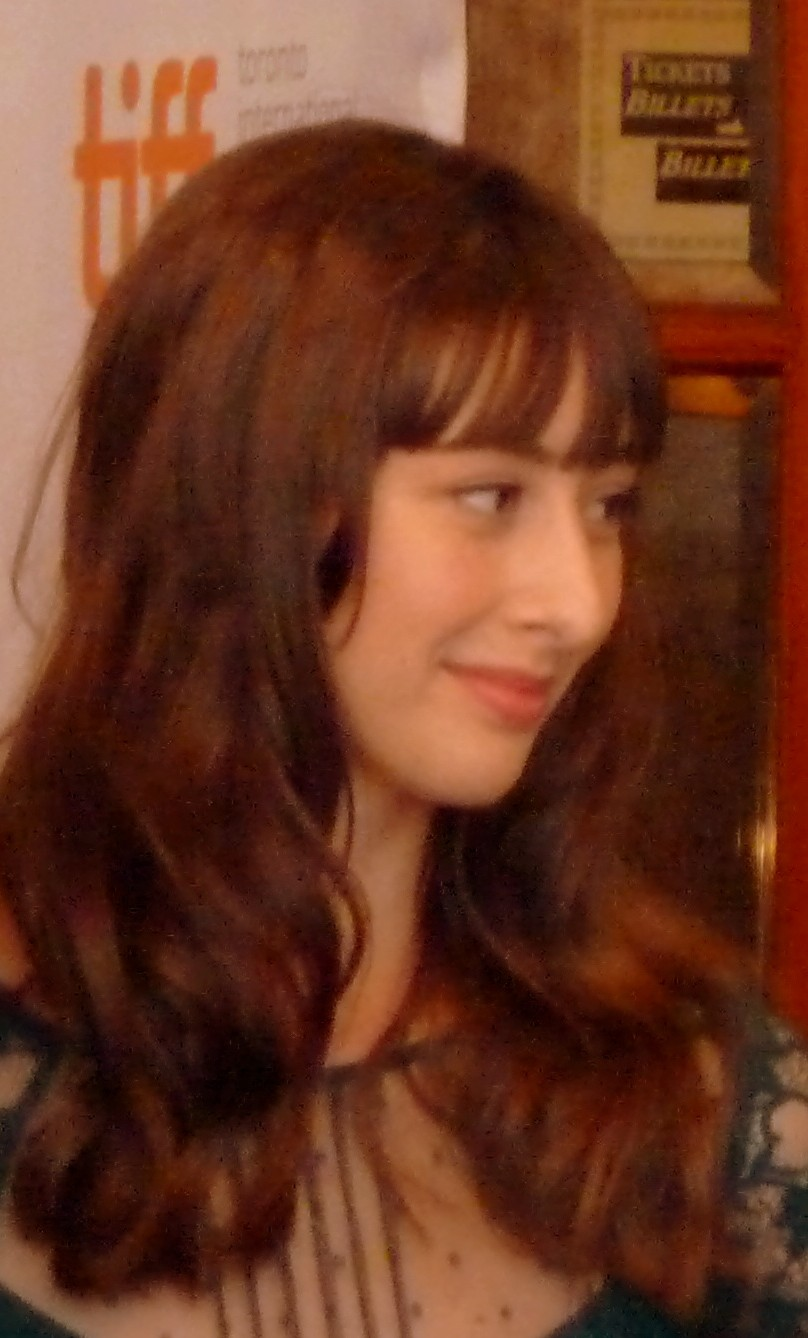
Jillian Morgese at the premiere of Much Ado About Nothing, Toronto Film Festival 2012

Jillian Morgese (born September 25, 1989) is an actress notable for her performance in the role of Hero in Joss Whedon’s 2012 film adaptation of William Shakespeare’s Much Ado About Nothing.

== Life and career ==
Raised in Fair Lawn, New Jersey, Morgese graduated from Fair Lawn High School in 2007, where she was initially more interested in athletics than acting.

Morgese, an alumna of the Fashion Institute of Technology, decided to pursue a career in film. She was noticed by Whedon as she was performing as an extra in The Avengers. Whedon referred to Morgese as having 'a quality which is undeniable'.

== Filmography ==
Film roles
Year	Title	Role	Notes
2012	The Avengers	Woman in Restaurant	Uncredited
2012	Much Ado About Nothing	Hero	
2018	Memories of My Father	Sam	Short film
2018	Too Long at the Fair	Party Princess	Short film
