= Alessandro Zaffonato =

Italian engraver

Alessandro Zaffonato (fl. 1730) was an Italian engraver of the late Baroque period. He engraved Raphael's Judgment of Solomon and a few other plates.
