= ShakespeaRe-Told =

BBC television adaptation of Shakespeare's plays

ShakespeaRe-Told is the umbrella title for a series of four television adaptations of William Shakespeare's plays broadcast on BBC One during November 2005. In a manner similar to that of the 2003 production of The Canterbury Tales, each play is adapted by a different writer and relocated to the present day. The plays were produced in collaboration by BBC Northern Ireland and the central BBC drama department. In August 2006 the four films aired on BBC America.

== Episodes ==
=== Much Ado About Nothing ===
- Adapted by David Nicholls
- Directed by Brian Percival
- Broadcast 7 November 2005
- Set in a local news studio, with Beatrice (Sarah Parish) and Benedick (Damian Lewis) as feuding anchors. Hero (Billie Piper), the weathergirl and daughter of station manager Leonard (Martin Jarvis), becomes engaged to Claude (Tom Ellis), the sports presenter. Jealous visual effects manager Don (Derek Riddell), plots to break up Hero and Claude, whilst the others attempt to get Beatrice and Benedick together. Hero and Claude eventually repair their friendship, though Hero refuses to consider marriage again, the ending is left ambiguous about their future as they are the best man and maid of honour (respectively) for the finale: the wedding of Beatrice and Benedick.

=== Macbeth ===
- Adapted by Peter Moffat
- Directed by Mark Brozel
- Broadcast 14 November 2005
- Set in a three Michelin star restaurant owned by celebrity chef Duncan Docherty (Vincent Regan), with Joe Macbeth (James McAvoy) as the sous chef and his wife Ella (Keeley Hawes) as the Maître d'. Joe and his fellow chef Billy Banquo (Joseph Millson) are annoyed that Duncan takes the credit for Joe's work, and that Duncan's son Malcolm (Toby Kebbell) has, in their opinion, no real flair for the business. Then they encounter three supernatural binmen who predict that Macbeth will get ownership of the restaurant, as will Billy's children. Joe and Ella are inspired to kill Duncan, but the binmen subsequently warn that Macbeth should be wary of Peter Macduff (Richard Armitage), the head waiter.

=== The Taming of the Shrew ===
- Adapted by Sally Wainwright
- Directed by David Richards
- Broadcast 21 November 2005
- Katherine Minola (Shirley Henderson) is a politician who hopes to become the Leader of the Opposition. She is told that her abrasive personality is bad PR and that it might be good for her image to get married. When penniless nobleman Petruchio (Rufus Sewell) shows up, interested at first in Katherine's money, sparks fly as Katherine seems to have met her match. The relationship and battle of wills bring big surprises for both parties. Katherine's sister Bianca (Jaime Murray) is a supermodel whose manager is Petruchio's friend, Harry (Stephen Tompkinson). Twiggy has the role of Katherine and Bianca's mother. David Mitchell played Kate's hapless secretary Tim.

=== A Midsummer Night's Dream ===
- Adapted by Peter Bowker
- Directed by Ed Fraiman
- Broadcast 28 November 2005
- Theo (Bill Paterson) and Polly (Imelda Staunton) visit Dream Park inclusive leisure facility to celebrate the engagement of their daughter Hermia (Zoe Tapper) to James (William Ash). The engagement party is, much to the irritable Theo's horror, disrupted by Hermia's true love Xander (Rupert Evans). Despite their own disagreements, the fairy rulers of the woods around Dream Park, Titania (Sharon Small) and Oberon (Lennie James), have a duty to ensure a happy ending, so Oberon gets Puck (Dean Lennox Kelly) — portrayed as a sort of magical wide boy — to try to sort things out with "love juice" eyedrops, while Oberon and Theo discuss their marriages. Puck's efforts inevitably lead to more confusion. Comedian Johnny Vegas appears as Nick Bottom who, like the other Mechanicals, is a Dream Park security guard who hopes to make it onto the entertainment staff.

== DVD ==
On 26 December 2005, a Region 2 DVD of the episodes was released by Acorn Media UK. A Region 1 release followed on 24 July 2007 from BBC Warner.
