= Hero (Much Ado About Nothing) =

Fictional character in the Shakespearean tragicomedy

- Much Ado About Nothing character
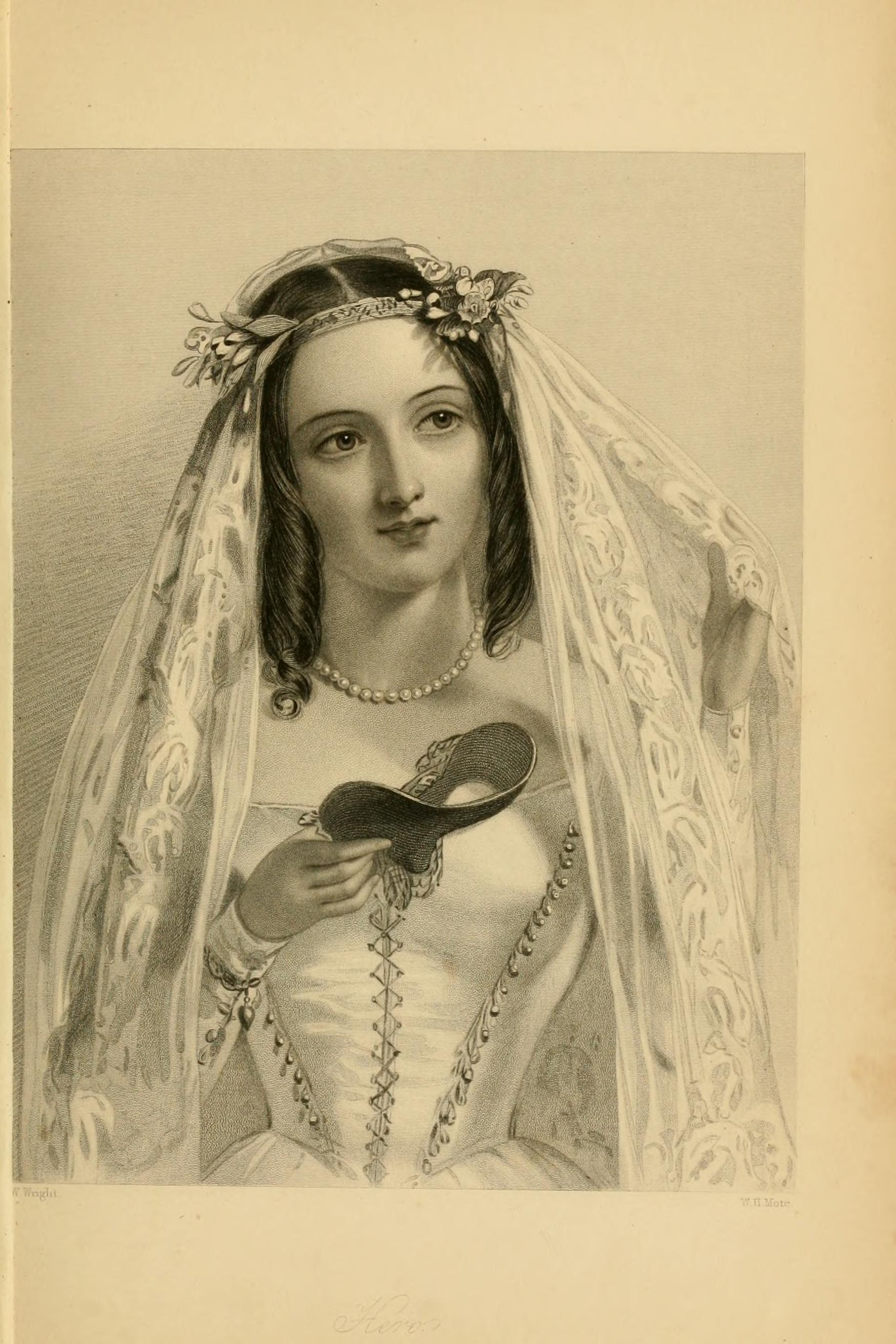
- John William Wright's 1849 depiction of Hero
- Created by: William Shakespeare
- Portrayed by: Ellen Terry; Kate Beckinsale; Jennifer Gould; Billie Piper; Jillian Morgese; Jennifer Paredes

In-universe information
- Relatives: Beatrice (cousin); Leonato (father)

Hero is a fictional character in William Shakespeare's play Much Ado About Nothing. She is the daughter of Leonato, a governor in Messina, and cousin to Beatrice. In the play, Hero falls in love with Claudio, who, under the influence of Don John, wrongfully accuses her of adultery; this leads her to fake her death. Hero is ultimately proven innocent, and reconciles with Claudio at the play's conclusion.

Hero's origins are possibly from The Faerie Queen, Orlando Furioso, and Matteo Bandello's Novelle. The Hero/Claudio plot has attracted criticism that its difference in tone from the Beatrice/Benedick plot gives rise to dramatic incoherence, and this has led to Much Ado About Nothing sometimes being termed a tragicomedy. Especially in the 20th and 21st centuries, Shakespeare's depiction of Hero has been criticized by feminist readings of the play.

Actresses that have portrayed Hero on stage and screen include Ellen Terry, Kate Beckinsale, Jennifer Gould, Billie Piper, Jillian Morgese and Jennifer Paredes.

== Origins ==
A version of the Hero-Claudio plot appears in Edmund Spenser's The Faerie Queene in Book II, Canto iv. Ludovico Ariosto's story of Ariodante and Genevra in Orlando Furioso is a likely source for Spenser's tale. It also influenced Shakespeare's interpretation of Hero and Claudio, though Melinda Gough identifies the Hero-Claudio plot more strongly with Ariosto's tale of Ruggiero and Alcin. However, Shakespeare may not have read Ariosto directly and possibly only had access to his works through translation.

Scholars have also located the origins of the Hero-Claudio plot within Matteo Bandello's twenty-second story of part one of his Novelle, which deals with the character of Fenicia. In this story, Fenicia is defamed because her lover overhears another man talking about her as if she was his mistress. Additionally, Fenicia's father is named Messer Lionato de' Lionati, a name which resembles Hero's father's. Bandello's story may be influenced by Chariton's Greek romance, Chaeras and Callirrhoe, which Shakespeare may had have access to through a French translation.

=== Name origins ===
The name Hero comes from the Greek ἥρως (heros) meaning "hero". Shakespeare's choice of the name Hero may have been a reference to Christopher Marlowe's Hero and Leander, which features the line, "Who ever lov'd, that lov'd not at first sight."

== Role in the play ==
Hero lives with her father, Leonato, and cousin, Beatrice, in Messina, Italy. At the play's outset, Leonato welcomes a group of soldiers to his house, including the young soldier Claudio. Claudio is immediately smitten with Hero. Don Pedro offers to woo her in his place and does so, disguised at Leonato's party. Claudio and Hero plan to marry in a week. Following along with Don Pedro's plan, Hero helps to gull Beatrice into thinking Benedick is in love with her.

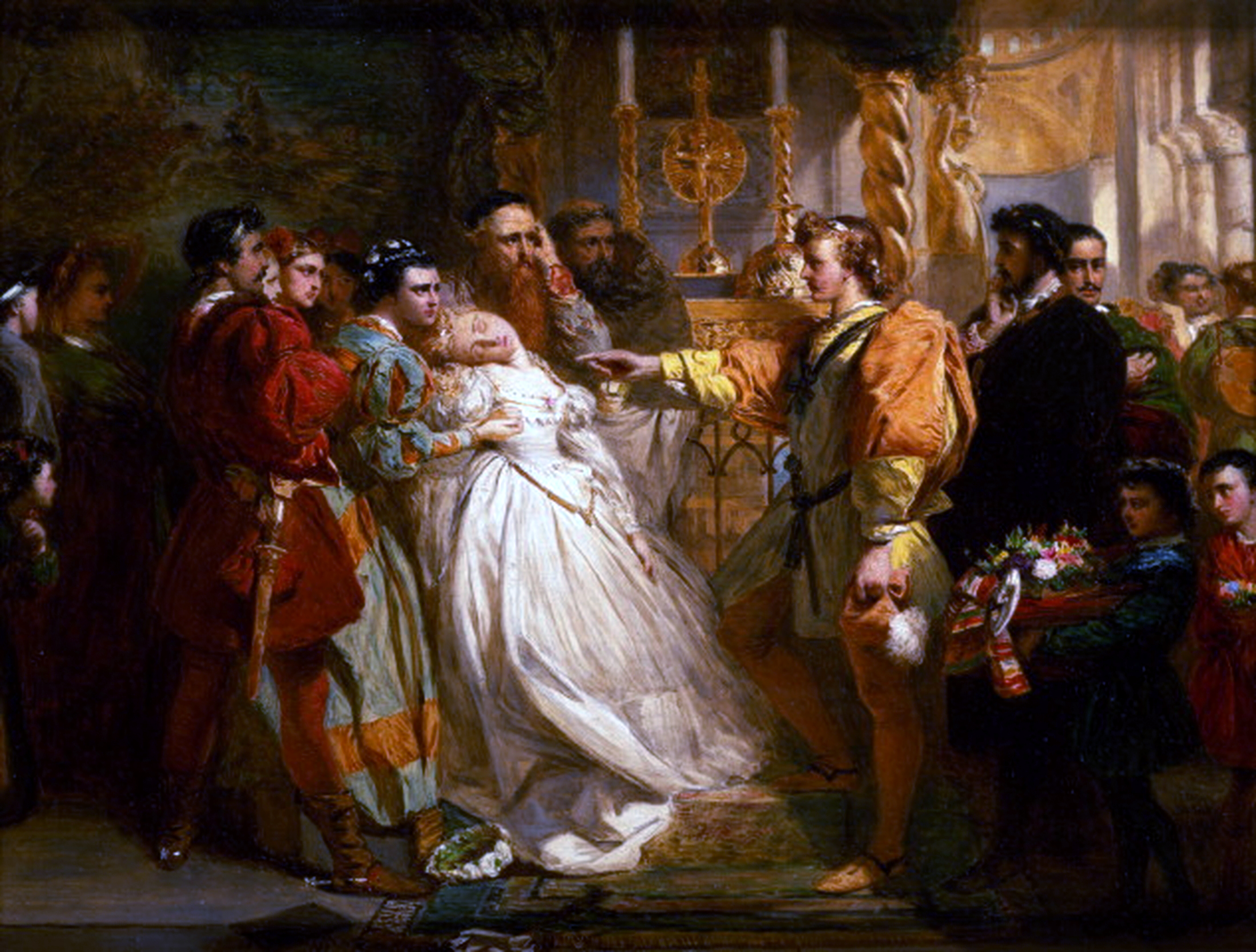
Marcus Stone's depiction of Hero fainting after being accused by Claudio

At her wedding to Claudio, Claudio, misled by Don Jon into thinking Hero (actually a disguised Margaret) spent the night before the wedding with Borachio, accuses Hero of being unfaithful. Being completely innocent of all accusations, Hero makes a few brief attempts to defend herself and ultimately faints. When she regains consciousness, the friar suggests that Hero fake her death to give the truth time to come to light and have Hero's accusers change their opinions of her. Dogberry discovers Don Jon's plot and proves Hero's innocence. Leonato invents a niece for Claudio to marry. The niece is actually a veiled Hero who reveals herself as the two marry.

== Analysis ==
Some critics have claimed that the Hero/Claudio plot is tonally inconsistent with the often light-hearted comedy Beatrice/Benedick plot. The darkness of Claudio's treatment of Hero has led some to label Much Ado a "trage-comedy". More contemporary critics have used this same argument to suggest that Much Ado is a "serious comedy", despite its flippant title.

=== Convention ===
The coupling of Hero and Claudio has been described by some scholars as the play's more conventional couple, in comparison to Beatrice and Benedick. Claudio's wooing of Hero is from afar and places him in the conventional Petrarchan position of the lover admiring his love as on a pedestal.

=== Feminist critiques ===
In Elizabeth Griffith's 1775 text, Morality of Shakespeare's Drama Illustrated, Griffith writes that the slander of Hero was "so very irksome a theme, that it disgusts me to dwell upon it." It was not until the late 19th-century that criticism of the patriarchal mistreatment of Hero reemerged. Grace Latham, in 1891, detested how Hero's independence and self-assertion are taken away from her. 20th-century feminist readings of Much Ado follow in Latham's view and often criticize the ways in which Hero and Beatrice are both silenced as they become wives.

=== Comparison to other Shakespeare characters ===
Scholars have noted that the sudden attraction in the Hero/Claudio plot shares certain similarities with Shakespeare's earlier play, Romeo and Juliet. Additionally, both Hero and Juliet are advised to fake their deaths by friars, though with wildly different outcomes. Martin Mueller identifies Hero as part of Shakespeare's "sleeping beauties", a group of female Shakespeare characters also including Hermione, Desdemona, and Juliet, whose "deaths are subject to doubt and draw attention to the poet's freedom to dispose of their fate one way or another."

== Performance history ==
=== Theatre ===
==== Asia ====
In the huangmei opera, Hero is called Hai Luo. In Jiang Weiguo and Sun Huairen's 1986 production with the Anhui Huangmei Opera, Hai Luo was played by Wu Qiong. In this production, after Claudio cried on Hero's supposed-grave, she emerged from it and sang and danced around Claudio.

==== Europe ====
Nederlands Toneel's 1983 production of Veel Leven Om Niets (Dutch) in Ghent, Belgium featured Chris Thys as Hero.

==== United Kingdom ====
Ellen Terry performed the role of Hero when she was 15 (c. 1863) at the Haymarket, though she is more widely remembered for her portrayal of Beatrice. In the 1870s, Ellen Wallis played Hero at the Drury Lane Theatre. She later took over the role of Beatrice from Helen Faucit.

In 1961, Michael Langham directed a production of Much Ado with the Royal Shakespeare Company in which, instead of showing Margaret pretending to be Hero meeting with Borachio, the actress who played Hero pretended to be Margaret pretending to be Hero. With the Royal Shakespeare Company, actresses including Julia Ford (1988), Kirsten Parker (2002), and Eleanor Worthington Cox (2025) have played Hero.

==== Canada ====
At the Stratford Festival in Stratford, Ontario, Hero has been played by many actresses including Jennifer Gould (1998), Sidonie Boll (1991), Bethany Jillard (2012)

===== United States =====
Rosalyn Newport played Hero at the 1958 Ashland Shakespeare Festival.

In 1981 Shakespeare in Central Park in Louisville, Kentucky, Janet Burrows played Hero. In 1980 in the San Francisco Bay Area, Hero was played by Deborah Moradzadeh (Valley Shakespeare Festival), Julia Fletcher (American Conservatory Theater), and Laurell Ollstein (San Francisco Shakespeare Company). Holly Thuma was Hero at the Three Rivers Shakespeare Festival in Pittsburgh in 1983. In 1988 at the New York Shakespeare Festival, Phoebe Cates played Hero.

In the Folger Theatre's 2005 production, Hero was played by Tiffany Fillmore. In 2019, Margaret Odette played Hero in an all-black production at Shakespeare in the Park in New York City. This performance was later broadcast on PBS as part of their Great Performances series.

In 2022, Hero was portrayed by Jennifer Paredes in Denver Center for the Performing Arts' production of Much Ado About Nothing.

=== Film ===
In the 1964 German adaptation of Much Ado About Nothing, Viel Lärm um Nichts, Ursula Körbs played Hero. In Kenneth Branagh's 1993 adaptation of the play, Hero was played by Kate Beckinsale. Hero was played by Jillian Morgese in Joss Whedon's 2012 adaptation of Much Ado About Nothing.

=== Television and web series ===
The first episode of the BBC Television Shakespeare, then known as the BBC Complete Works, was set to be a production of Much Ado About Nothing featuring Ciaran Madden as Hero. This 1978 episode was scrapped for unconfirmed reasons, though it was filmed and edited in its entirety. Much Ado About Nothing was reshot for the seventh series of the BBC Television Shakespeare with Katharine Levy as Hero.

In the ShakespeaRe-Told adaptation of Much Ado About Nothing, Billie Piper played Hero. In this production, Hero was a weather presenter. The play's ending was altered to remove the wedding of Hero and Claude (Note: ShakespeaRe-Told changed Claudio's name to Claude) and to have Hero reject Claude's apology for his accusations during the wedding. However, the production hints at a possible reconciliation between the two in the final scene when Beatrice and Benedick marry.

In the web series "Nothing Much To Do", Hero was played by Pearl Kennedy. "Nothing Much To Do" was a New Zealand adaptation told through vlogs that transposed the play to a high school setting.
