= Dogberry =

Character in Much Ado About Nothing

- Much Ado About Nothing character
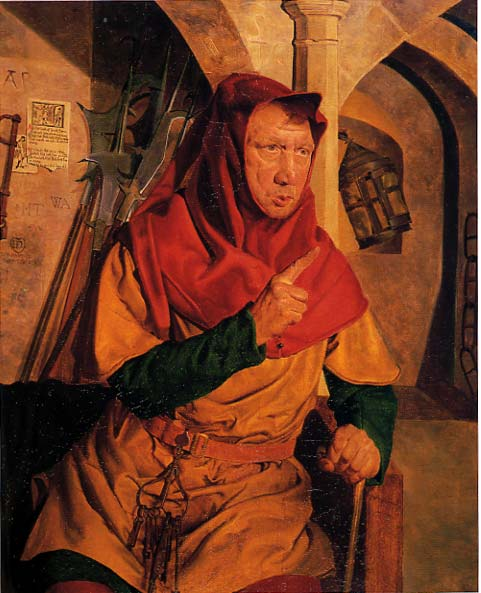
- Dogberry, as depicted by Henry Stacy Marks
- Created by: William Shakespeare
- Portrayed by: Christopher Benjamin; Michael Elphick; Nathan Fillion; Frank Finlay; Barnard Hughes; Michael Keaton; Terry Woods

In-universe information
- Affiliation: Messina

Dogberry is a character created by William Shakespeare for his play Much Ado About Nothing. The Nuttall Encyclopædia describes him as a "self-satisfied night constable" with an inflated view of his own importance as the leader of a group of comically bumbling watchmen. Dogberry is notable for his numerous malapropisms, sometimes called "dogberryisms" or "dogberrys". The character was created for William Kempe, who played comic roles in Shakespeare's theatre company the Lord Chamberlain's Men.

== In the play ==
In the play, Dogberry is the chief of Messina's citizen-police. He is first seen instructing his constables on their duties. He tells them that it is perfectly fine to sleep on duty, and that if they see a thief, they should not touch him, to avoid becoming defiled by association with crime.

During their watch, the constables overhear a conversation between two characters, Boraccio and Conrade, one of whom is part of Don John's plot to discredit Hero. They misunderstand the conversation and arrest the two on the spot for acts of "treason" because they called Don John a villain.

They are brought before the governor Leonato, who is at a loss to understand Dogberry's nonsensical description of the alleged crimes, but allows Dogberry to examine them. His absurd pseudo-legal rhetoric confuses matters even more, but when the Prince arrives at the truth about Don John, the plot is revealed and the arrested man confesses. Dogberry is rewarded for his diligence and leaves.

== Comic persona ==
As is usual in Shakespearean comedy, and Renaissance comedy generally, Dogberry is a figure of comic incompetence. There is humour in his frequent use of malapropism, a product of his pretentiousness, as he attempts to use sophisticated terminology with disastrous results. The character's name is the Elizabethan common name for the fruit of the common dogwood (Cornus sanguine), considered lowly and inferior to other edible berries. Shakespeare appears to be poking mild fun at the amateur police forces of his day, in which respectable citizens spent a fixed number of nights per year fulfilling an obligation to protect the public peace, a job for which they were, by and large, unqualified.

But Dogberry and his crew are also given a thematic function, as they (accidentally) uncover Don John's plot and begin the process of restoration that leads to the play's happy conclusion. In that sense, Dogberry's comic ineptitude is made to serve the sense of a providential force overseeing the fortunate restoration of social and emotional order.

In addition to frequent malapropism, Dogberry provides the list of charges as a numbered list out of order comprising redundant items:

Marry, sir, they have committed false report;
moreover, they have spoken untruths;
secondarily, they are slanders;
sixth and lastly, they have belied a lady;
thirdly, they have verified unjust things;
and, to conclude, they are lying knaves.

and, in trying to make sure that the criminals' insulting of him is recorded in the evidence against them, Dogberry repeatedly insists that it be written down that "[he is] an ass." Implying that fact only makes his case worse and adds humour to the story.

While Dogberry is clearly unsuited for his role and a comedic character, he is ultimately a good man trying to do the right thing, however ineptly.

== Elizabethan law enforcement ==
According to historian John W. Draper, Dogberry's behaviour as constable is an exaggeration of genuine problems with the amateur policing system at the time, in which sleeping during the night-watch was common, and watchmen often tried to avoid confronting criminals.

Since the office of constable was supposed to circulate among the commonality, everyone must have known what his duties were at least supposed to be, and so everyone could understand Shakespeare's travesty; and, since honest fellows who quaffed late at the taverns were likely to run afoul of him on the way home, his powers and his procedure were as widely understood as those of our modern state police upon the highways. Indeed, the Queen's own jester, Tarleton, was twice taken into custody for being on the streets after ten, and had to rely on his wit to avoid being jailed.

Though the play is nominally set in Sicily, Dogberry's watch appear to be acting under English law of the period, according to which loiterers at night could be arrested under the catch-all charge of vagrancy. Indeed, that would be the legal basis for arresting Boraccio and Conrade: "Though they do not say so, they were in reality arresting the men as vagrants according to Dogberry's injunction".

== Production history ==
=== Theatre ===
Dogberry was almost certainly created to be performed by William Kempe, as the names "Kemp" and "Kem" are sometimes accidentally substituted for the character-name in the published version of the play.

Dogberry was played by the noted comedy actor Samuel Johnson during the 1880s and 1890s for Henry Irving at the Lyceum Theatre in London. John Martin-Harvey described him as the acknowledged Shakespearean clown of his day, and his portrayal of Dogberry (1882 and 1893) reflects this claim.

In a noted 1976 Royal Shakespeare Company (RSC) production set in India during the British Raj, John Woodvine played Dogberry "as a member of the local constabulary with a Peter Sellers Indian accent". Christopher Benjamin alternated in the role with Terry Woods in Terry Hands' 1982 production for the RSC.

In the RSC's 2014 production, titled Love's Labour's Won, Nick Haverson played Dogberry. His performance was both praised and criticized for its addition of complexity through playing Dogberry's eccentricities and language errors as a potential side effect of PTSD or shell shock after fighting in the same war that Don Pedro and his soldiers are returned from (in this production, the First World War).

=== Film and television ===
Dogberry was played by Michael Keaton in Kenneth Branagh's 1993 film adaptation and has been played on television by Michael Elphick, Frank Finlay, and Barnard Hughes. He was played by Nathan Fillion in Joss Whedon's 2012 film version.
